= Mount Yong Yap =

Mountain in Kelantan and Perak, Malaysia

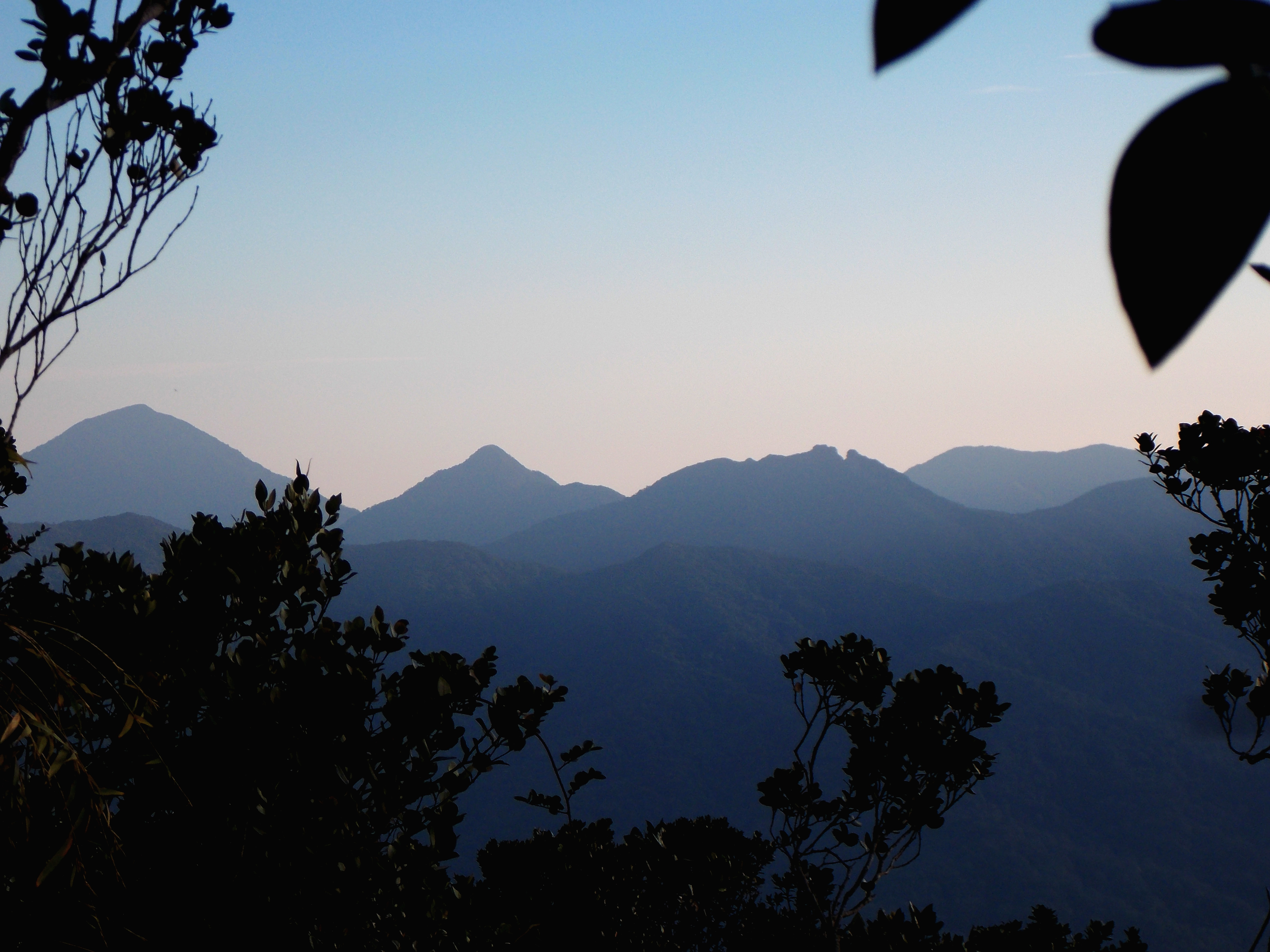
- View from Camp Kuali, north of Yong Belar. From left to right: Yong Yap, Bubu and Tok Nenek

Highest point
- Elevation: 2,168 m (7,113 ft)
- Listing: Ribu
- Coordinates: 4°45′00″N 101°22′59″E

Naming
- Native name: Gunung Yong Yap (Malay)

Geography
- Location within Malaysia
- Location: Lojing Autonomous Subdistrict, Kelantan; Kuala Kangsar District, Perak
- Parent range: Titiwangsa Mountains

Climbing
- Easiest route: Hiking via Kuala Mu (west) or Pos Rengil (east)

Mount Yong Yap (Malay Gunung Yong Yap) is a mountain located along the Perak and Kelantan state border in Peninsular Malaysia. At 2,168 m (7,113 ft), it is the third highest mountain in Kelantan and the sixth highest in Peninsular Malaysia. This mountain is part of the Titiwangsa Range which is an extension of the Tenasserim Range from Myanmar and Thailand.

== Hiking ==
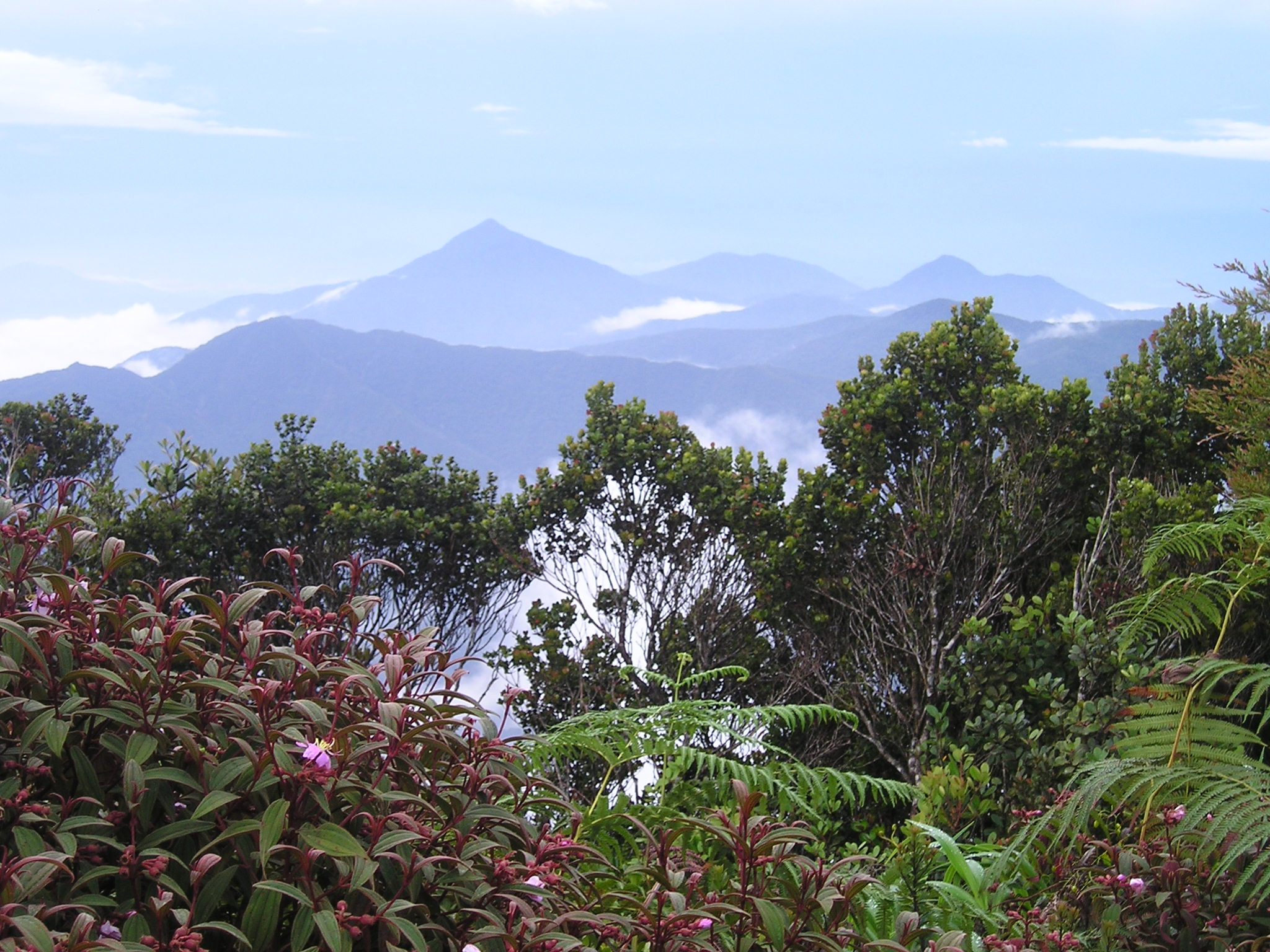
Yong Yap as seen from the summit of Korbu

One of the G7 mountains, the Yong Yap trek is considered to be one of the most toughest mountain treks in Peninsular Malaysia. The mountain trail is deemed tough as there are fallen tree trunks, sharp-edged bamboos and thorny trees that poses a lot of challenge for hikers to get to the mountain's peak. The conical shape of the mountain means having to go up an extremely steep gradient to the summit. This mountain is definitely not recommended for people inexperienced at climbing mountains in the tropical rainforest.

Mount Yong Yap can be accessible via Kuala Mu from the west. There are also several logging trails that lead to the mountain and are only accessible via 4WD vehicles.

== Wildlife hazards ==
There have been reports of tiger attacks in the past around this area. The latest known casualty was an orang asli who got mauled to death by a Malayan tiger. There are also the usual leeches and sand flies that populate the entire mountain.

== See also ==
- List of mountains in Malaysia
