= Mount Gayong =

Mountain in Perak, Malaysia

- Location within Malaysia

Highest point
- Elevation: 2,173 m (7,129 ft)
- Listing: Ultra; Ribu
- Coordinates: 4°40′59″N 101°19′00″E

Naming
- Native name: Gunung Gayong (Malay)

Geography
- Location: Kinta District, Perak, Malaysia
- Parent range: Titiwangsa Mountains

Mount Gayong (Malay: Gunung Gayong) is a mountain in Peninsular Malaysia, situated within the Titiwangsa Range along the border between the states of Perak and Kelantan. It is fourth highest mountain in the Malay Peninsula, at 2,173 metres. It can be reached in about an hour's trek from the peak of Mount Korbu, the highest mountain of the range and the second highest mountain in Peninsular Malaysia. Due to the close proximity between the two mountains, they are collectively known as Korga among the hiking and mountaineering community.

It is a favourite site for mountain climbing.
