= Mount Nuang =

Mountain in Selangor and Pahang, Malaysia

- Forest canopy near the summit of Mount Nuang

Highest point
- Elevation: 1,493 m (4,898 ft)
- Prominence: 856 m (2,808 ft)
- Listing: Spesial Ribu
- Coordinates: 3.26667°N 101.9°E

Naming
- Native name: Gunung Nuang (Malay)

Geography
- Location within Malaysia
- Location: Bentong District, Pahang; Hulu Langat District, Selangor
- Parent range: Titiwangsa Mountains

Mount Nuang (Malay: Gunung Nuang) is a mountain located in Malaysia, with a height of 1,493 metres (4,898 ft). Its peak borders the states of Pahang and Selangor and is close to the Pahang-Selangor-Negeri Sembilan tripoint. The mountain itself is the third highest point in Selangor after Mts. Semangkok and Ulu Kali, and is part of the Titiwangsa Mountains.

There are three hiking routes to the peak and all of them were built by the Malaysian Department of Wildlife and National Parks. Two of them start in Selangor; one at Kuala Pangsoon in Hulu Langat and another at Kampung Kemensah in Gombak. The third path originates from Bukit Tinggi in Bentong, Pahang. Genting Highlands is visible at night from the peak. On the Kuala Pangsoon route, the climb involves a two-hour hike on a very steep road, then an optional stop at "Camp Lolo", and after that there is a six-hour push to the peak, and a four-hour trek to the ground.

== Gallery ==
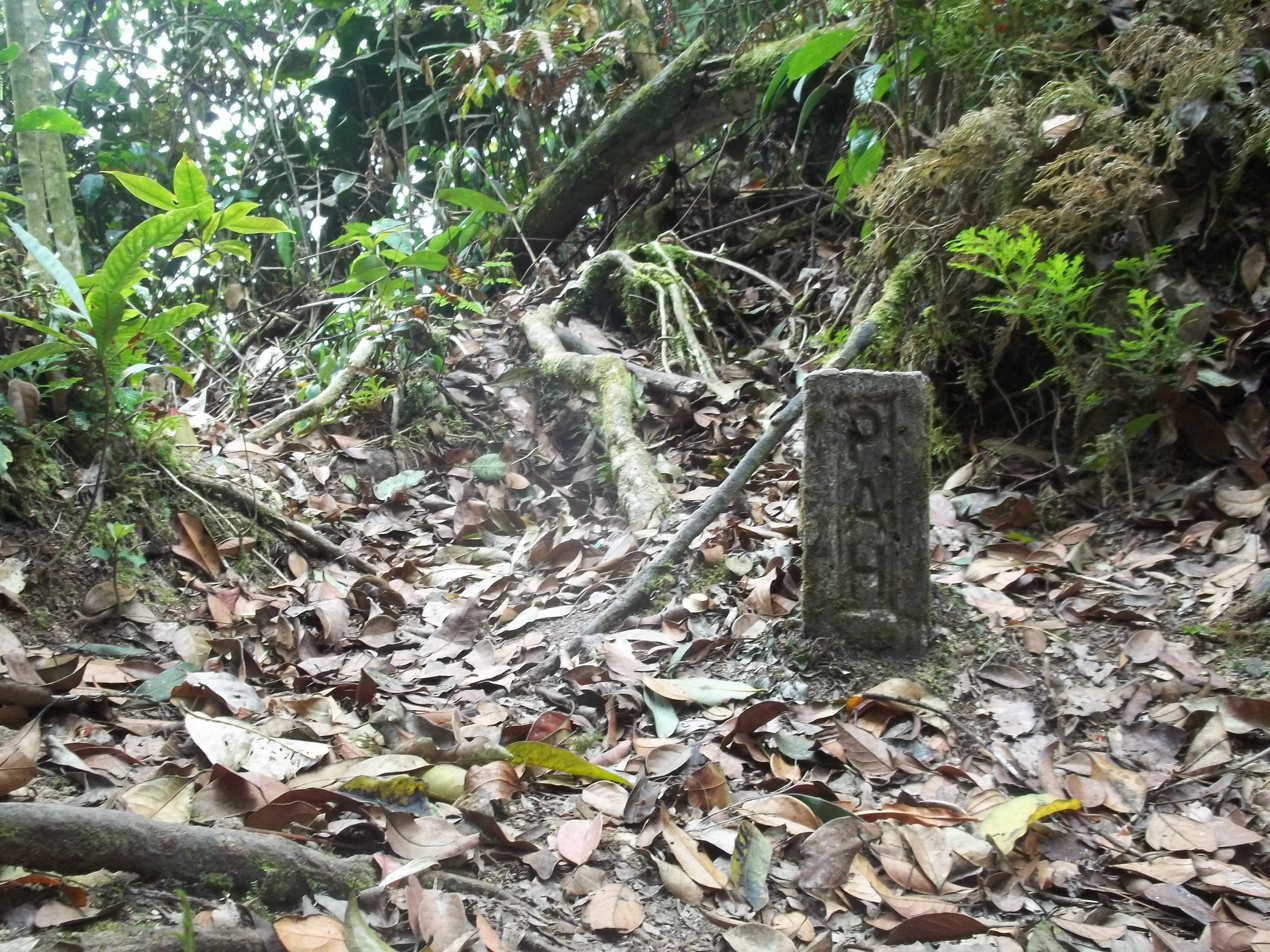
Border stone at the Mount Nuang hiking track, marking the state boundary between Selangor and Pahang.

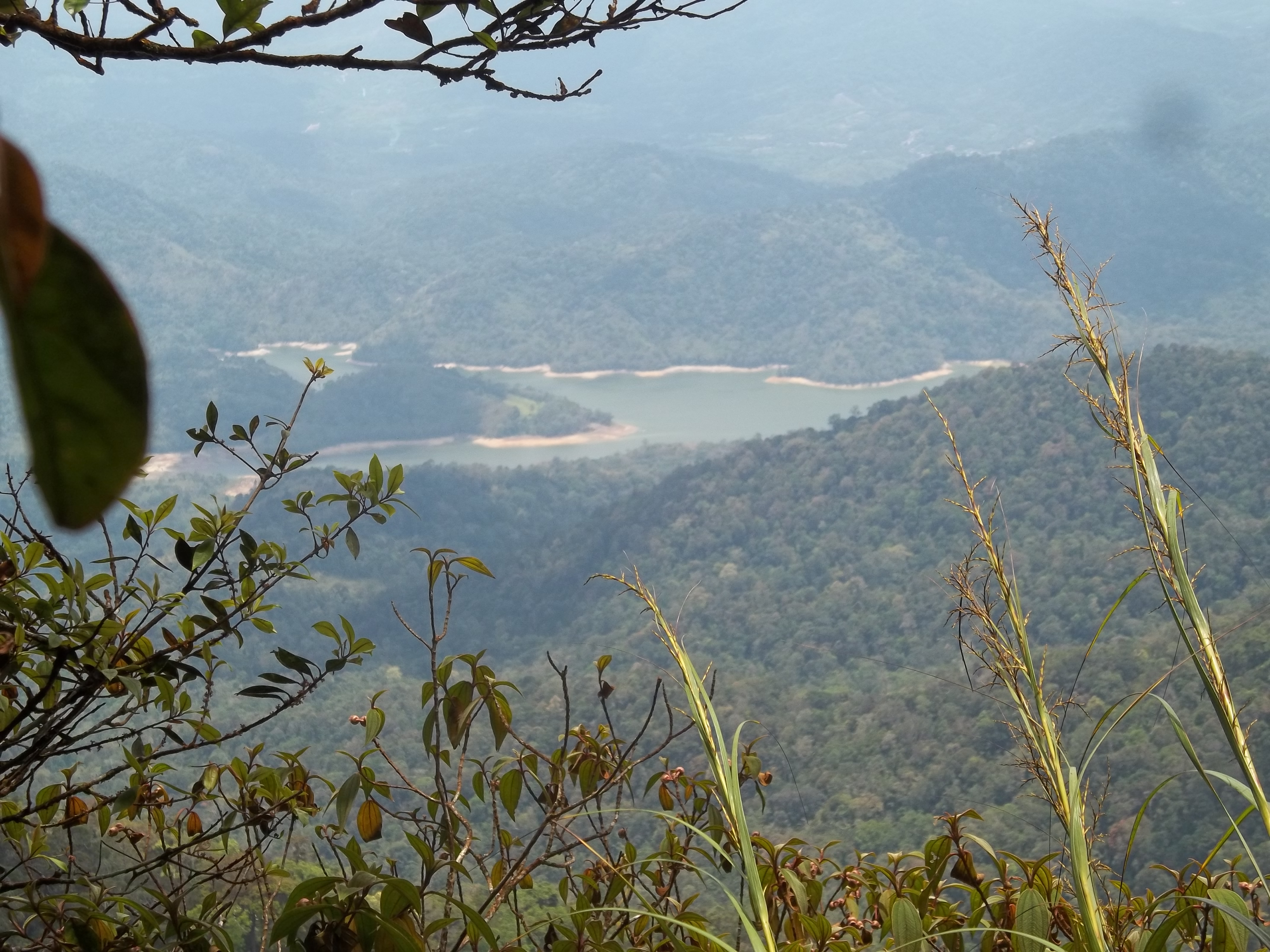
View just before reaching Mount Nuang's peak.

A squirrel beside the Mount Nuang hiking trail

Flowering plant along the Mount Nuang hiking trail

== See also ==
- Bukit Tabur (Taman Melawati Hill)
- List of mountains in Malaysia
