= Titiwangsa Mountains =

Mountain range in Thailand and Malaysia

- Banjaran Titiwangsa/Besar (Malay) ทิวเขาสันกาลาคีรี (Thai)
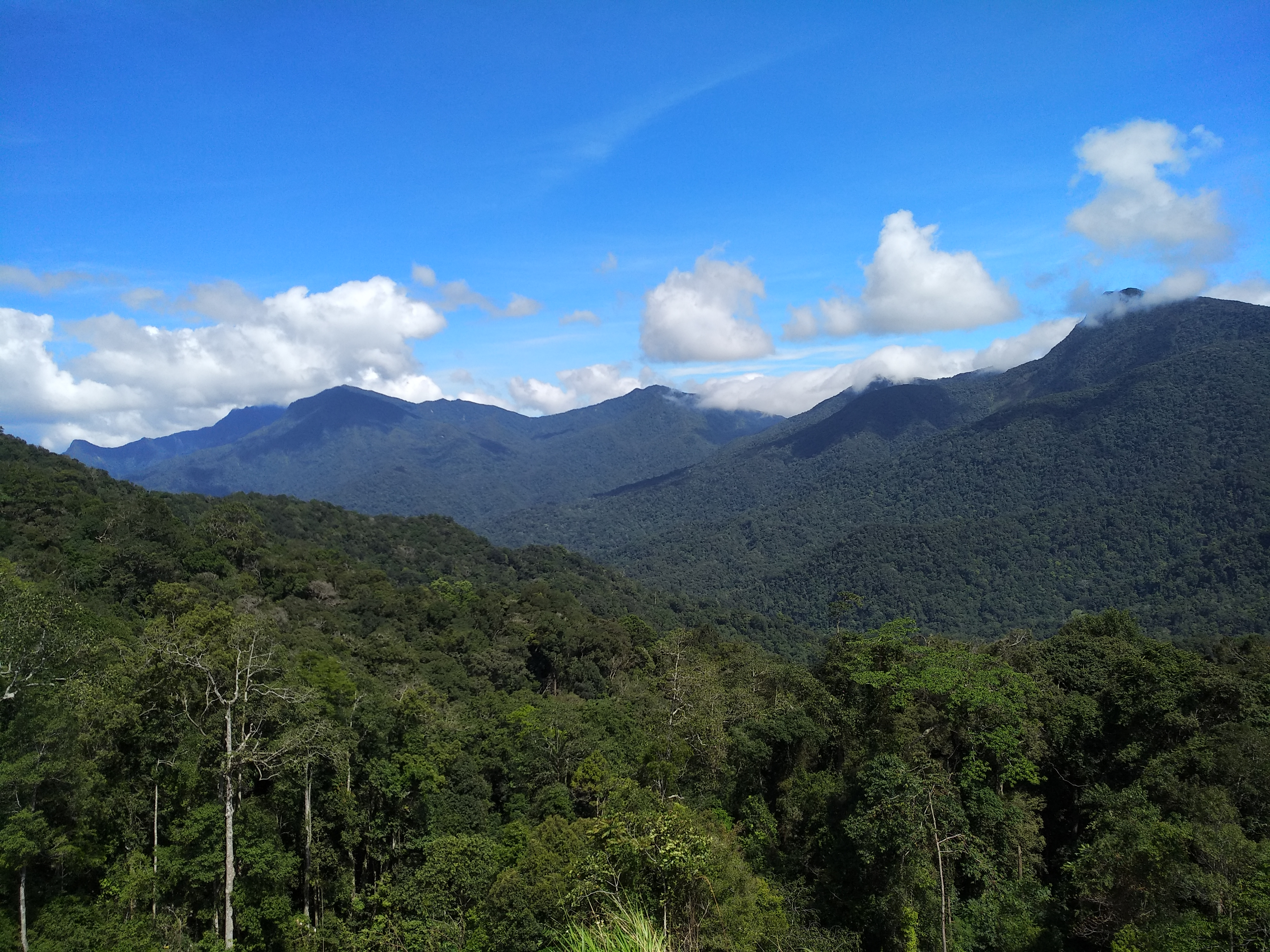
- The view of the Titiwangsa Mountains near Mount Suku.

Highest point
- Peak: Mount Korbu
- Elevation: 2,183 m (7,162 ft)

Dimensions
- Length: 480 km (300 mi) NW/SE
- Width: 120 km (75 mi) NE/SW

Geography
- Countries: Thailand; Malaysia
- Provinces/States: Songkhla; Yala; Narathiwat; Perak; Kelantan; Pahang; Selangor; Negeri Sembilan
- Range coordinates: 5°58′12″N 101°19′37″E
- Parent range: Tenasserim Hills

Geology
- Rock ages: Permian; Triassic
- Rock types: Granite; quartzite; limestone

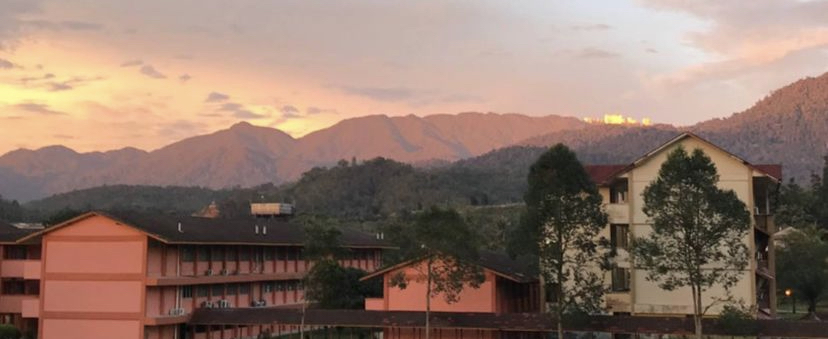
The Titiwangsa during golden hour as viewed from the rural town of Ulu Yam, Selangor.

The Titiwangsa Mountains (Malay: Banjaran Titiwangsa, pronounced [ˈband͡ʒaˈran titiwaŋˈsa]), also known as Banjaran Besar (lit. 'main range') by locals, is the chain of mountains that forms the backbone of the Malay Peninsula. The northern section of the range is in southern Thailand, where it is known as the Sankalakhiri Range (Thai: ทิวเขาสันกาลาคีรี; RTGS: Thio Khao Sankalakhiri; pronounced [tʰīw kʰǎw sǎn.kāːlāːkʰīːrīː]).

The mountain range acts as a natural divider, dividing Peninsular Malaysia, as well as southernmost Thailand, into east and west coast regions. It also serves as a drainage divide of some major rivers of Peninsular Malaysia such as the Pahang, Perak, Kelantan, Klang and Muar. The length of mountain range is about 480 km from north to south.

== Geography ==
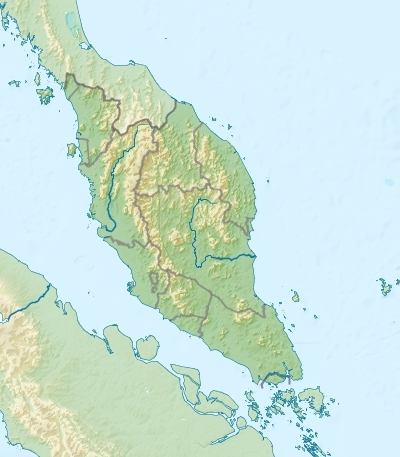
Relief map of Peninsular Malaysia, highlighting its mountainous core. The Titiwangsa Mountains is the longest range running along the border between the states of Perak and Selangor on the west coast with Kelantan and Pahang on the east coast, eventually straddling across the state of Negeri Sembilan further south. Nearby systems include Keledang and Bintang Ranges to its northwest, Benom Massif to the southeast, and Tahan Range to the east.

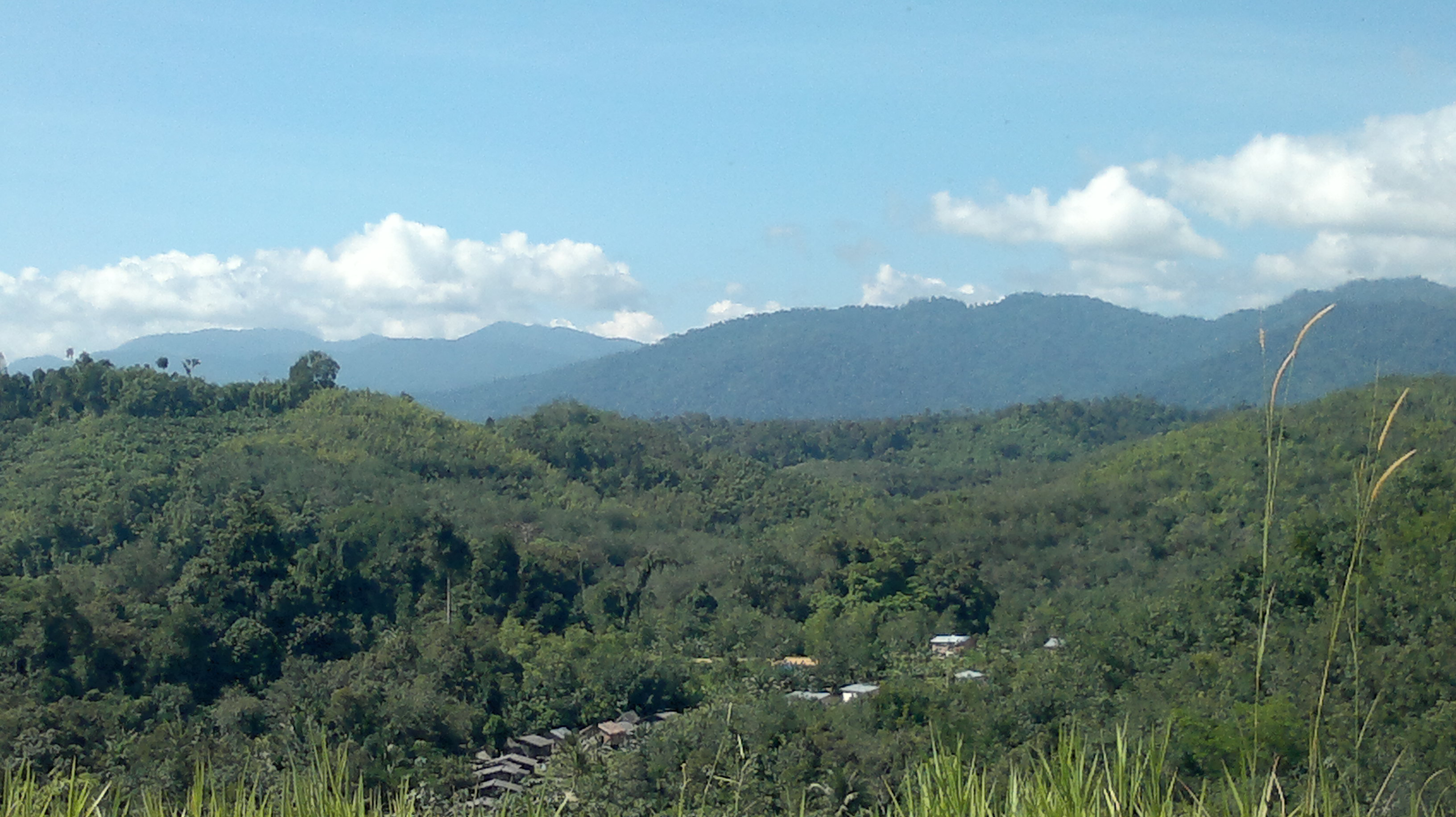
Pahangese/Perakian Titiwangsa, Lipis District, Pahang, en route towards Cameron Highlands.

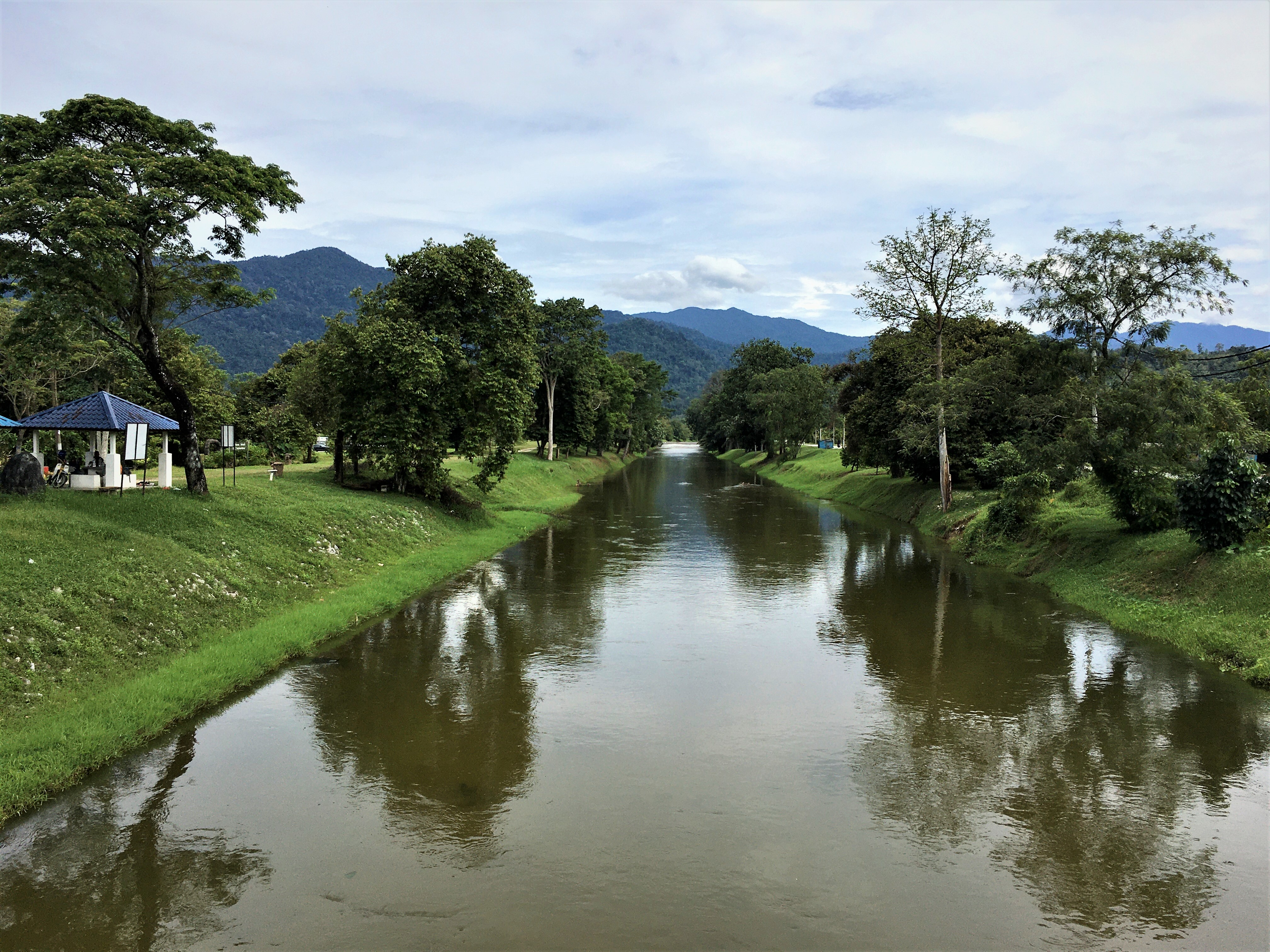
The upstream section of the Selangor River at Ampang Pechah, backdropped by the Selangorean/Pahangese Titiwangsa.

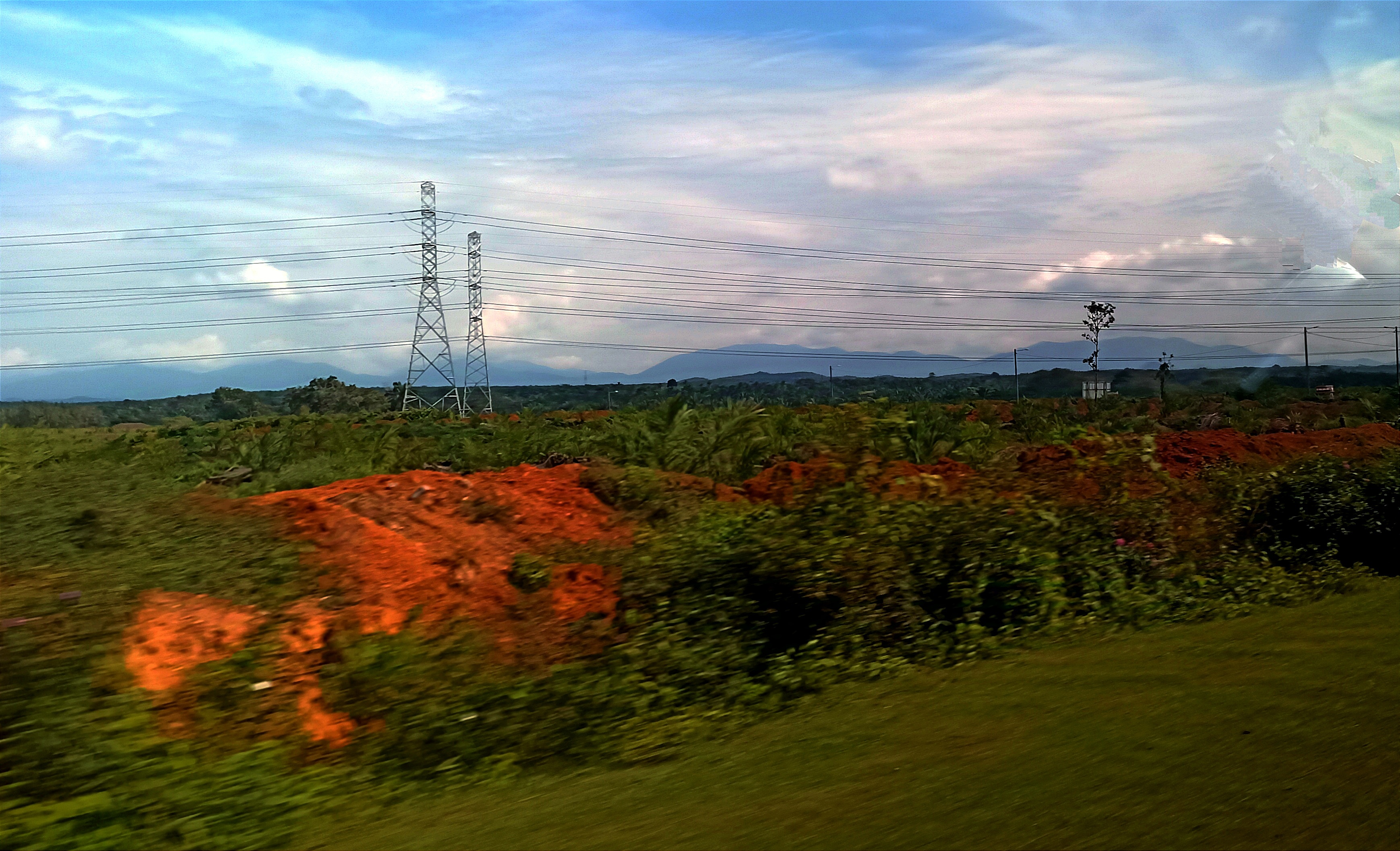
The Negri Titiwangsa seen from a Malaccan countryside. They form the southernmost section of the Titiwangsa Mountains entirely.

This mountain range is a part of the wider Tenasserim Hills. It forms the southernmost section of the Indo-Malayan cordillera which runs from Tibet through the Kra Isthmus into the Malay Peninsula.

The Titiwangsa Mountains proper begin in the north as the Sankalakhiri Range, a prolongation of the Nakhon Si Thammarat Range which includes the smaller Pattani, Taluban, and Songkhla sub-ranges. The Sankalakhiri marks the border between the Southern Thai provinces of Yala in west and Narathiwat in the east. Across the border into Malaysia, the main stretch of the range runs in a northwest–southeast orientation, straddling the borders between the west coast states of Perak and Selangor with Kelantan and Pahang on the eastern side of the peninsula. From the tripoint of Pahang, Selangor and Negeri Sembilan near Mount Nuang, it then transverses through the middle of the state of Negeri Sembilan, also a west coast state, thus dividing the state into two regions – western Negeri Sembilan, which consists of Seremban, Port Dickson and Rembau Districts, and eastern Negeri Sembilan, composed of the districts of Jelebu, Kuala Pilah, Jempol and Tampin – and terminates in the south near the town of Tampin, in the southern part of the state. Outcrops of Titiwangsa granite, mainly consisting of inselbergs, project further south into Malacca, where it abuts in the waters of the Strait of Malacca in Pulau Besar.

In general, the greatest elevations occur along the northern and central sections of the range, with its highest point measuring 2,183 m (7,162 ft) on Gunung Korbu, Perak. On the Thai side, the highest point is 1,533 m (5,026 ft) Ulu Titi Basah (ยูลูติติ บาซาห์), at the Thai/Malaysian border between Yala province and Perak. On the other hand, the height gradually diminishes towards the southern reaches of the range, which mainly runs through Negeri Sembilan, with elevations ranging from 1,462 m (4,797 ft) at its highest on Mount Besar Hantu, on the border between the state and Pahang, as well as 1,193 m (3,914 ft) on Mount Telapak Buruk on the boundary between the districts of Seremban and Jelebu to 500–900 metres (1,600–3,000 ft).

== Geology ==
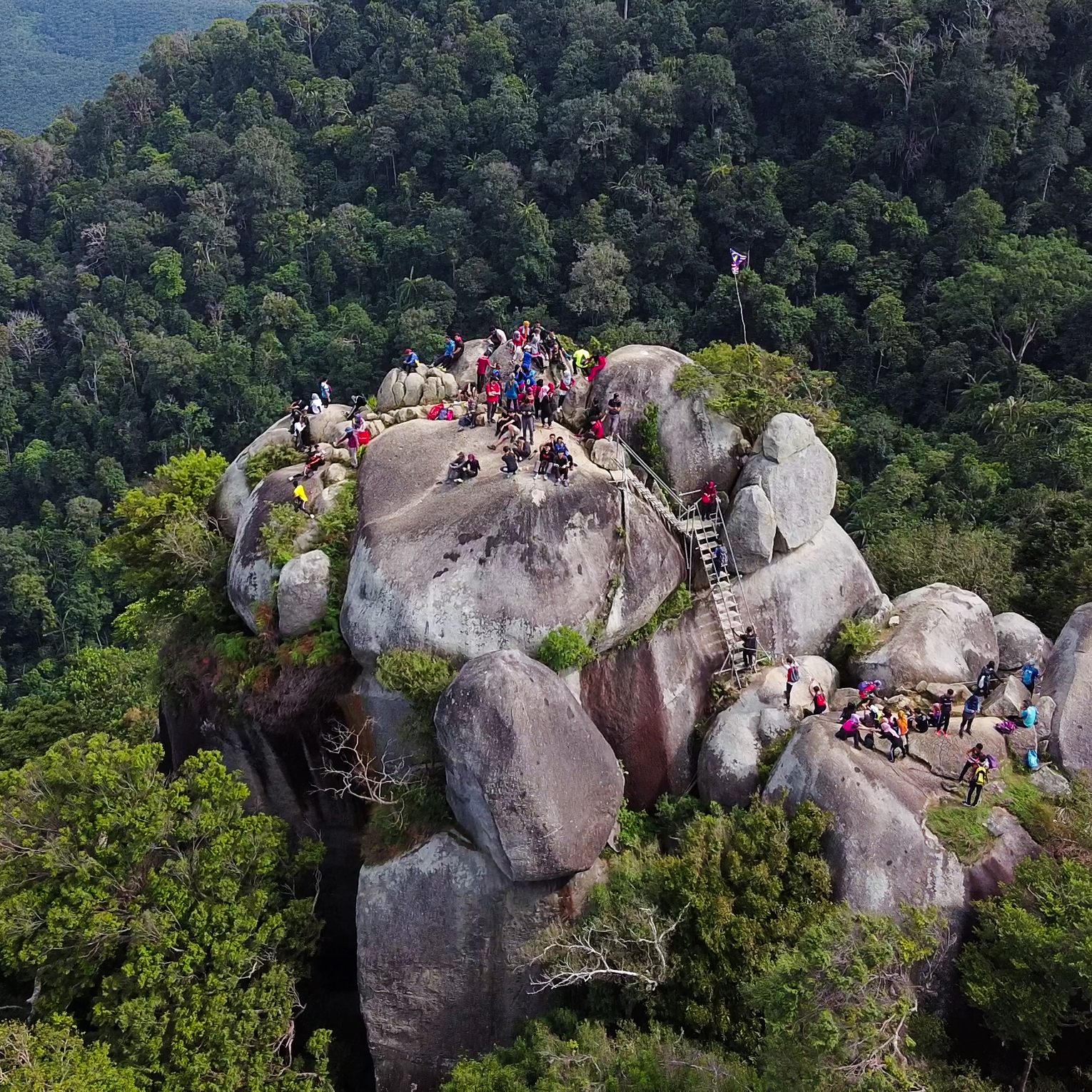
A granitic tor on the summit of Mount Datuk, Rembau District, Negeri Sembilan, towards the southern end of the mountain range.

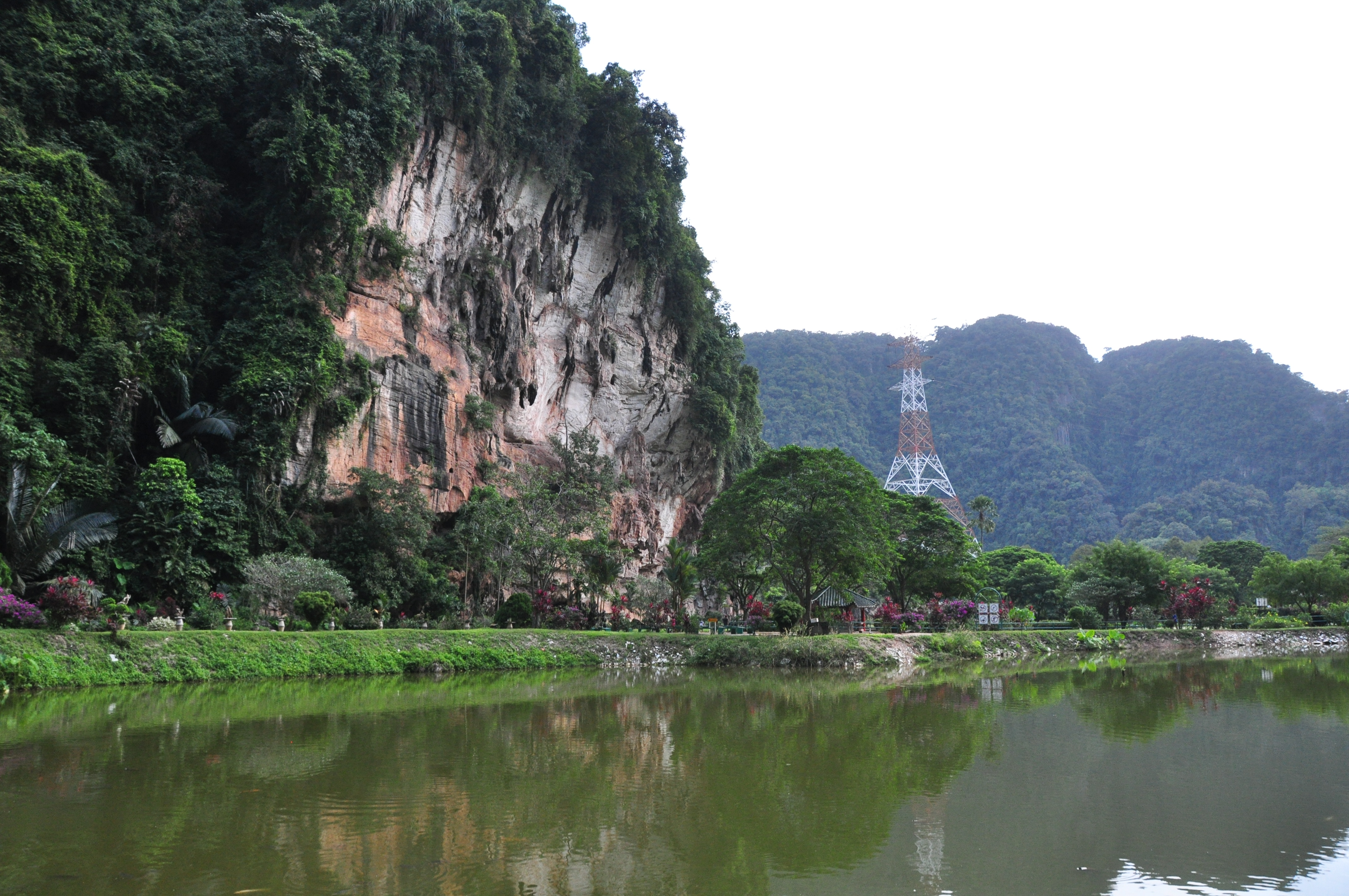
Mogotes dot along the western foothills of the range in Kinta District, Perak, part of Kinta Valley National Geopark.

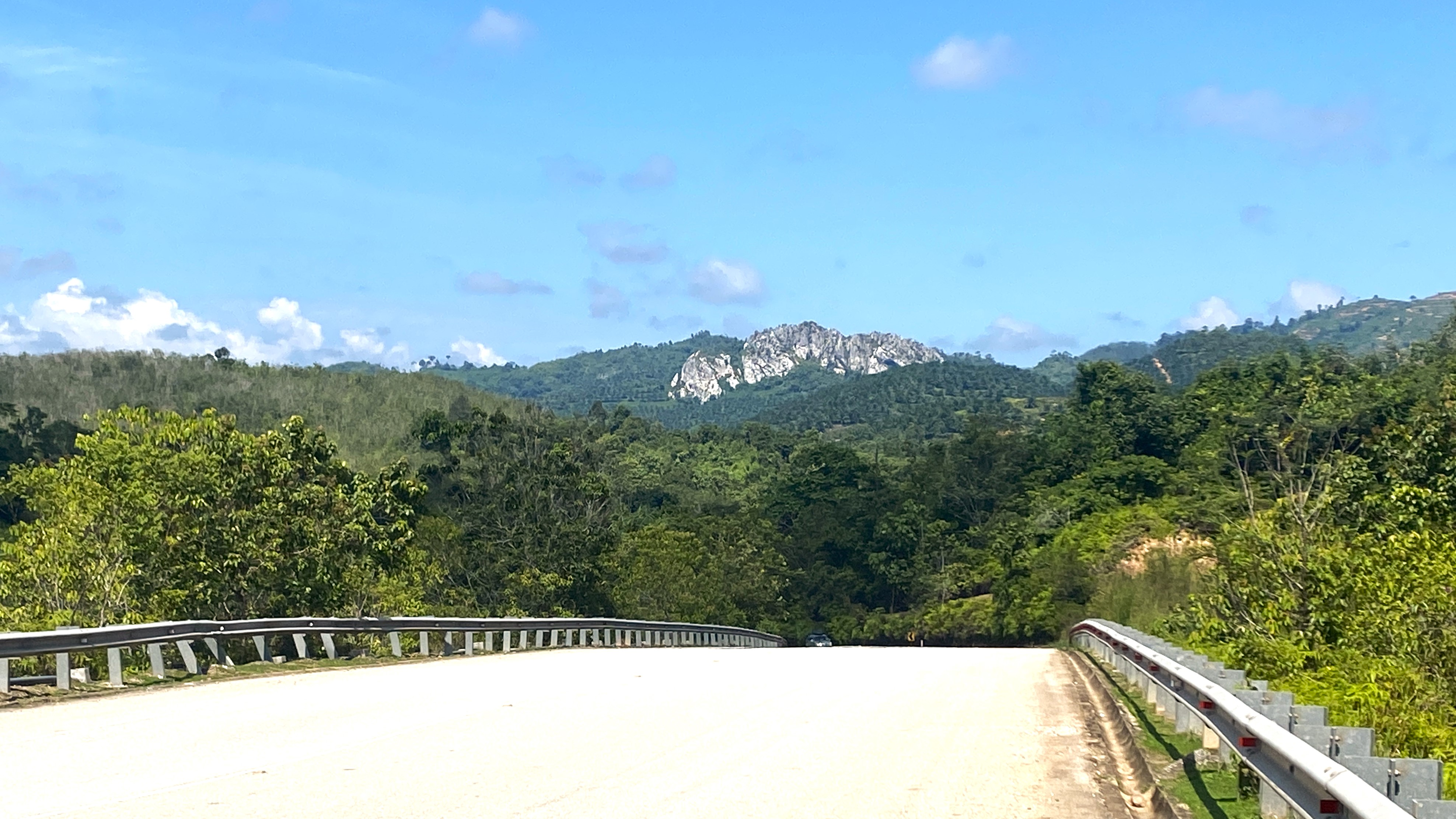
Quartzite outcrop at Lojing, southwestern Kelantan, part of the Bentong-Raub suture zone flanking the range's eastern foothills.

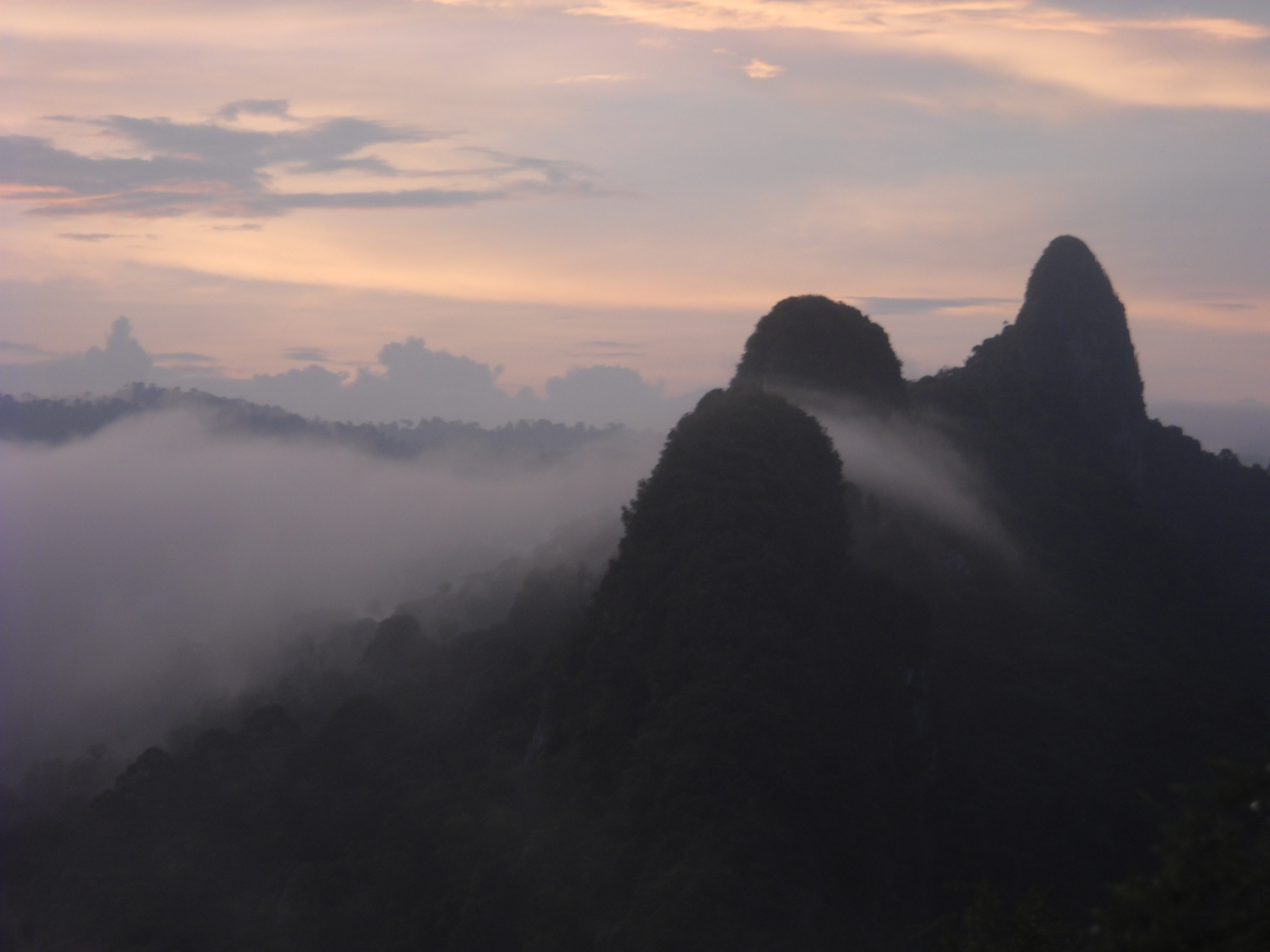
Spires of quartzite at the Klang Gates Quartz Ridge on the western foothills of the range in Gombak District, Selangor.

The Titiwangsa Mountains are predominantly granitic. The mountain range is part of a suture zone that runs north–south, starting in Thailand at the Nan-Uttaradit suture zone (partly coincident with the Dien Bien Phu fault), and extending south towards Peninsular Malaysia (Bentong-Raub suture zone). The eastern half of the Titiwangsa Mountains in Peninsular Malaysia is an amalgamation of continental terranes known as Cimmeria or Indochina, whereas the western half is an amalgamation of continental terranes Sinoburmalaya or Sibumasu. These two halves of terranes were separated by the Paleo-Tethys Ocean.

The Cimmeria was separated from Gondwana around 400 mya during the Devonian and rifted towards Laurasia, the northeastern arm of Pangea. It attached to Laurasia completely around 280 mya during the Late Permian.

Sibumasu terranes on the other hand, only started to separate from Gondwana during the Early Permian and rifted towards Indochina. The collision of the Sibumasu terranes and Indochina terranes 200 mya during the Late Triassic resulted in the closure of the Paleo-Tethys Ocean and formation of the modern Titiwangsa Mountain belts.

=== Seismic hazards ===
Peninsular Malaysia, while being tectonically stable, has a history of intraplate earthquakes, with most of them of low magnitudes. As the Bentong-Raub suture runs parallel to the Titiwangsa Mountains, a large network of fault lines crisscross the mountain range. The known major fault lines in the mountains are the Bukit Tinggi, Kuala Lumpur and Seremban fault lines, with the first two being the most active.

Between 1984 and 2013, there were tremors ranging from 1.6 to 4.6 on the Richter scale with local epicentres in Kenyir Lake, Manjung, Temenggor, Bukit Tinggi and Kuala Pilah, the latter three being situated along the Titiwangsa Mountains. As a precautionary move, the Department of Minerals and Geosciences pitched 23 Earthquake Benchmark (PAG, Malay: Penanda Aras Gempa) stations around earthquake-prone areas in Peninsular Malaysia, with 13 in Pahang, six in Selangor, and two each in Perak and Negeri Sembilan to monitor possible movements within the fault network. The Ministry of Natural Resources, Environment and Climate Change (NRECC) also pointed out that strong earthquakes centred in neighbouring Sumatra, Indonesia could potentially activate ancient faults in Peninsular Malaysia and the effects of tremors could be felt around areas along the west coast of Peninsular Malaysia.

== Features ==
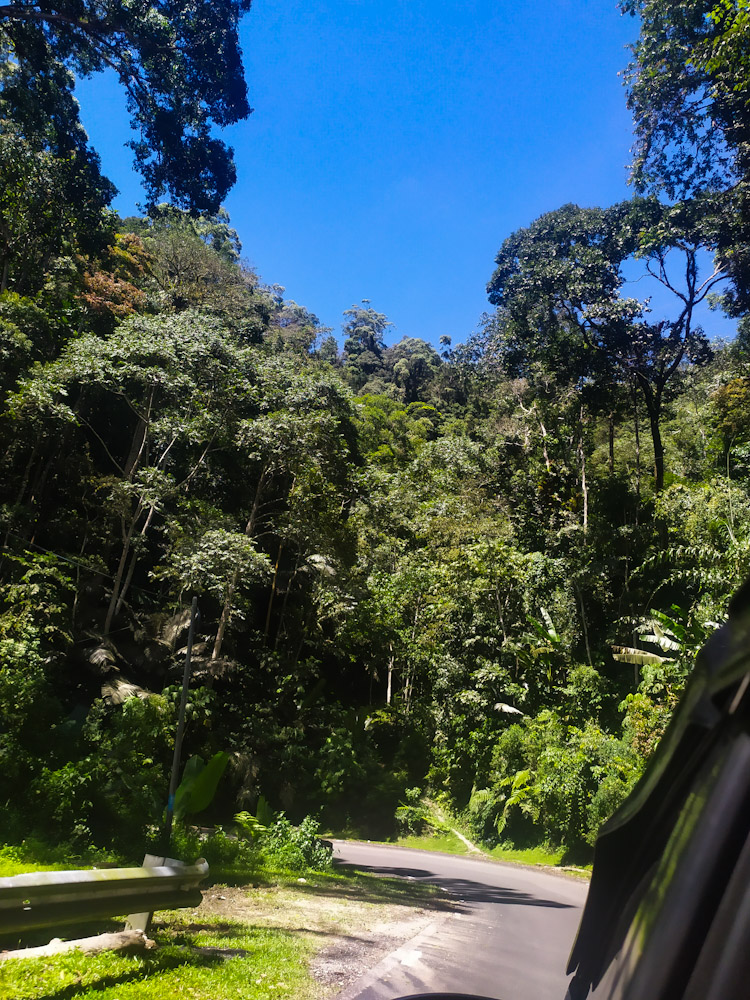
Tropical rainforest near Ringlet on the border between Pahang and Perak, part of the Central Forest Spine.

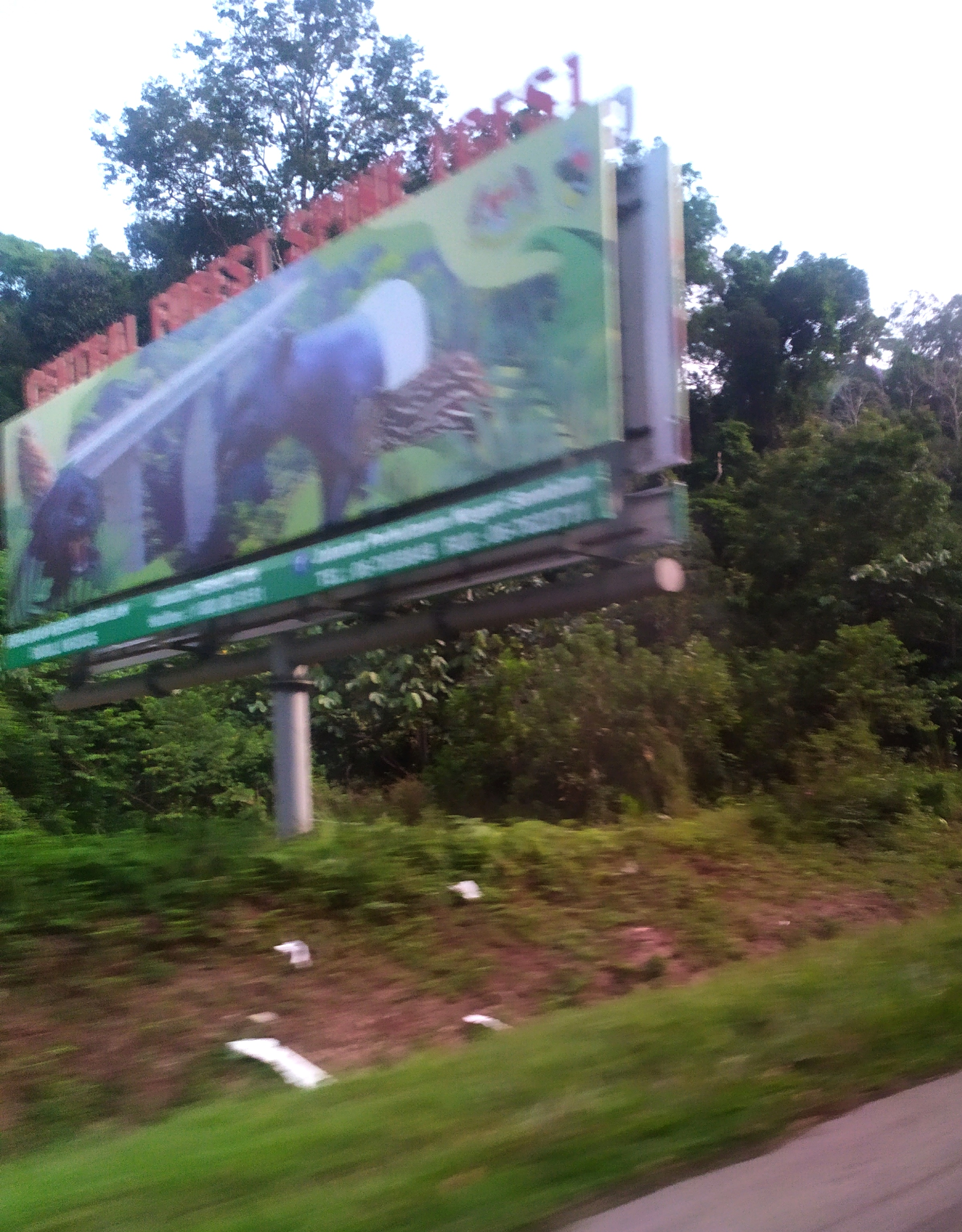
Central Forest Spine signboard on Federal Route FT 51 near Bukit Putus, Negeri Sembilan.

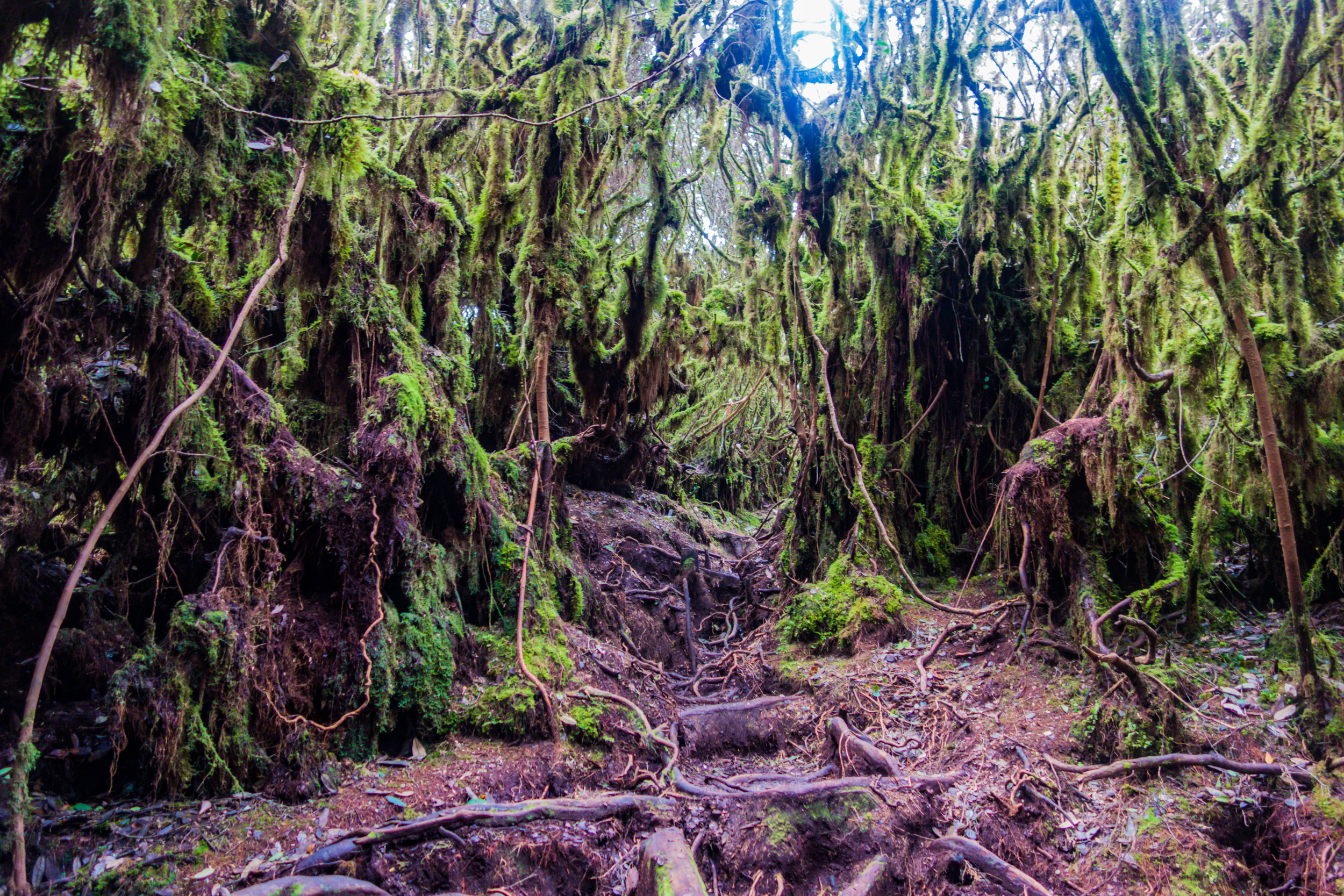
Mossy forest on Mount Irau. Such forests are characteristic to the higher elevations of the Titiwangsa Mountains.

The rainforests of the Titiwangsa Mountains form part of the Titiwangsa Forest Complex, which is itself part of the larger Central Forest Spine conservation area. A number of roads and highways cut through the mountain range, effectively acting as mountain passes linking settlements on either side of the range.

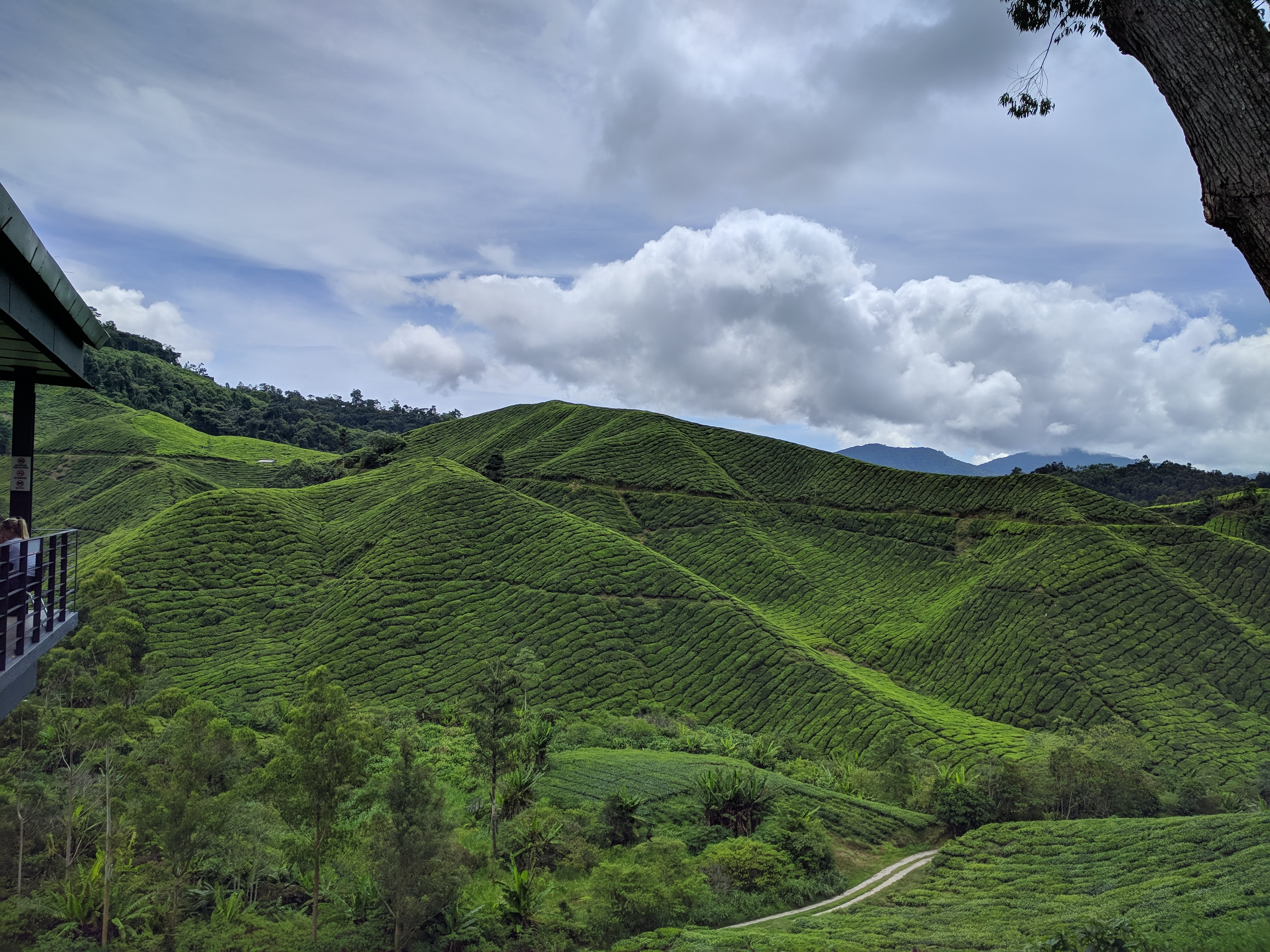
Tea plantation in Cameron Highlands

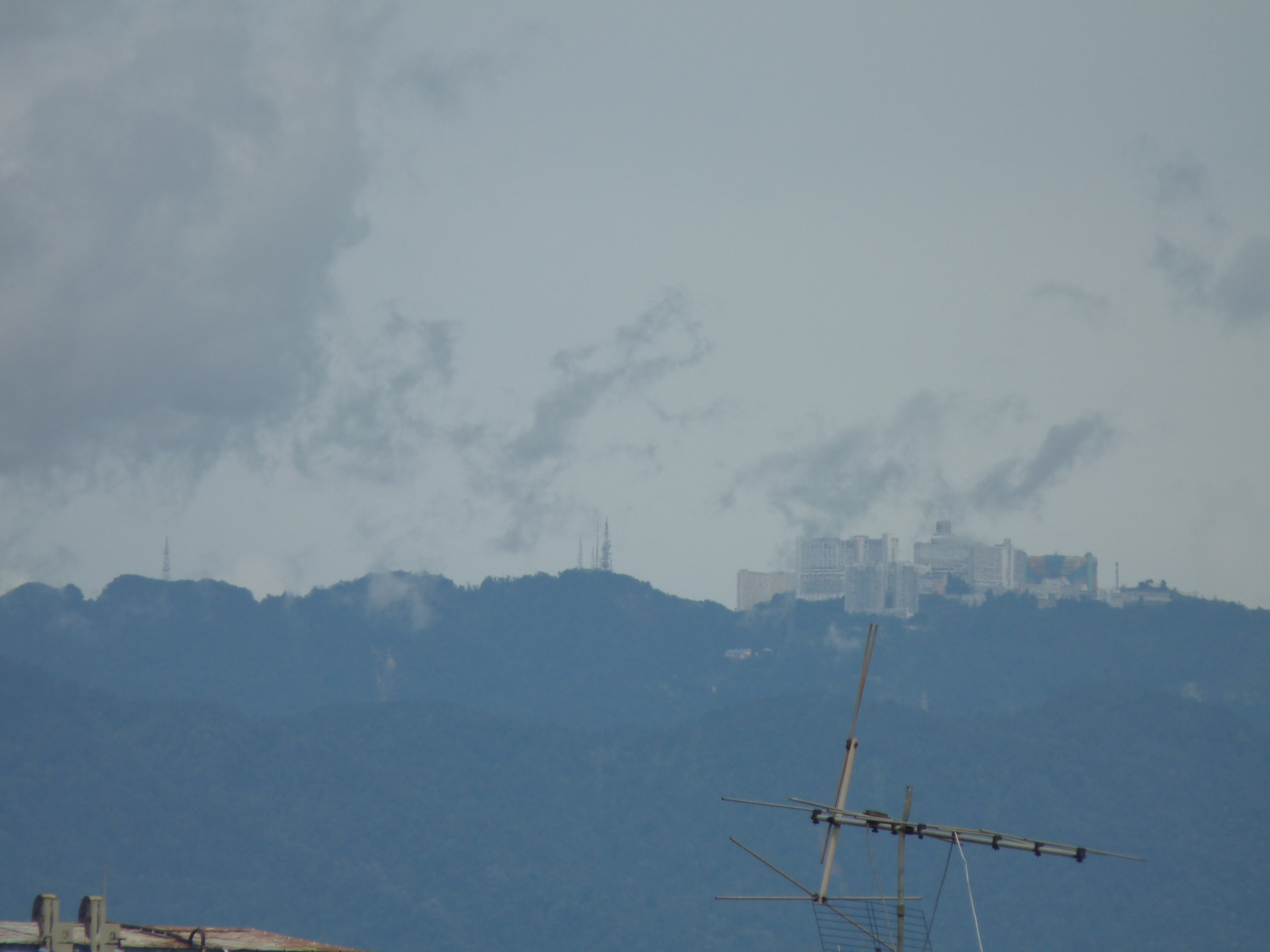
Genting Highlands, as seen from Kuala Lumpur

Several popular tourist destinations such as Royal Belum, hill resorts such as Cameron Highlands, Genting Highlands and Fraser's Hill are located on the range.

Two of Malaysia's largest metropolitan areas are located along the western fringes of the mountain range, namely Greater Kuala Lumpur (ranked #1) and Kinta Valley (ranked #4). The Kinta Valley Geopark encompasses the entirety of Kinta Valley, where kegelkarst topography is prevalent.

== Protected areas ==
=== Thailand ===
- San Kala Khiri National Park
- Budo–Su-ngai Padi National Park
- Bang Lang National Park
- Namtok Sai Khao National Park
- Hala-Bala Wildlife Sanctuary

=== Malaysia ===
- Gunung Stong State Park
- Selangor State Park
- Kenaboi State Park
- Royal Belum State Park
- Krau Wildlife Reserve
- Kinta Valley National Geopark
- Forest Research Institute Malaysia

== In popular culture ==
The mountain range was the subject of the patriotic song "Titiwangsa", which was first sung by Saloma. Its lyrics glorifies the magnificence and beauty of the Titiwangsa Mountains, and its significance to Malaya as a whole.

== Gallery ==
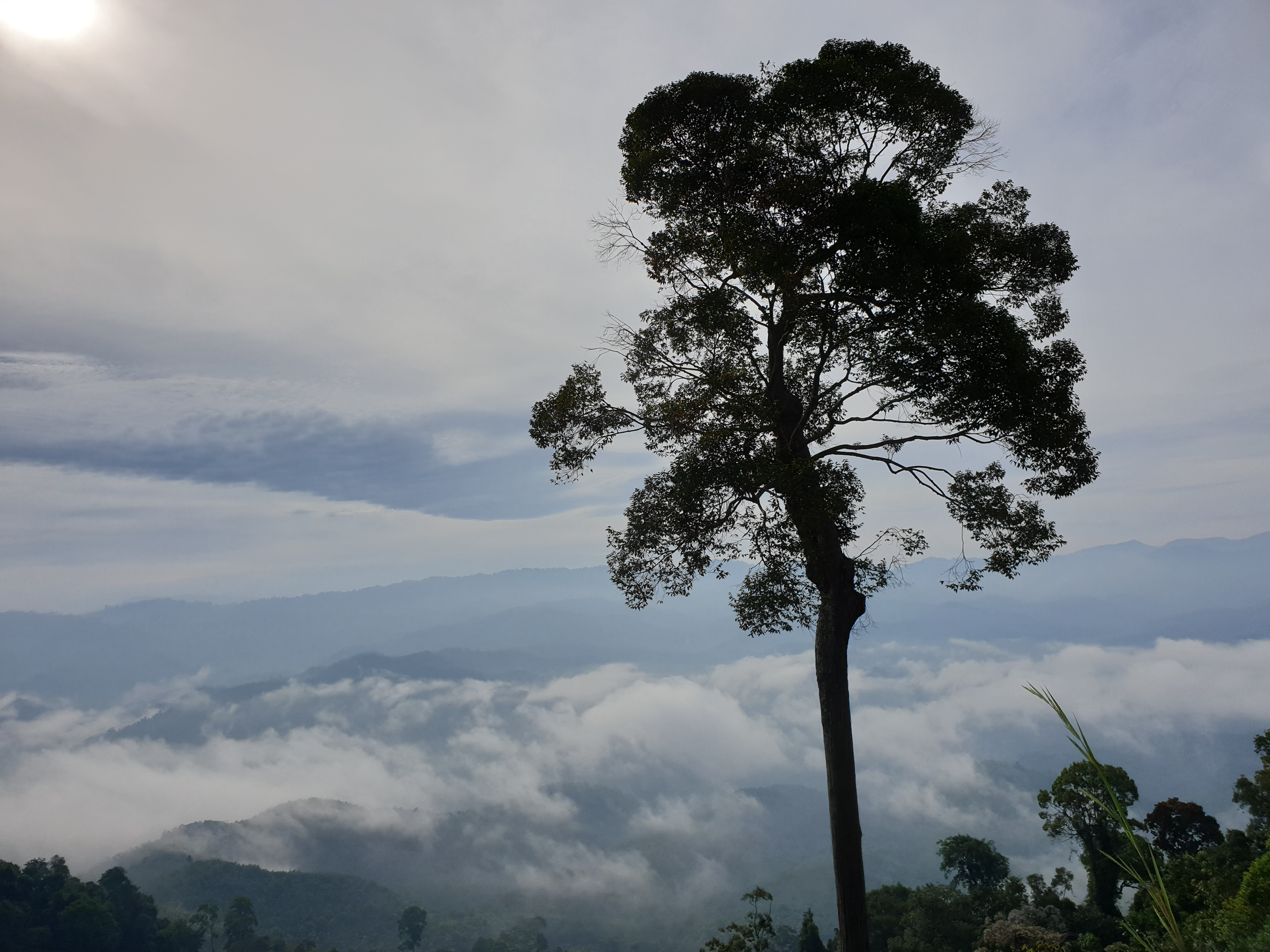
View of the Sankalakhiri in Aiyoeweng, Yala, near the Bang Lang Reservoir.

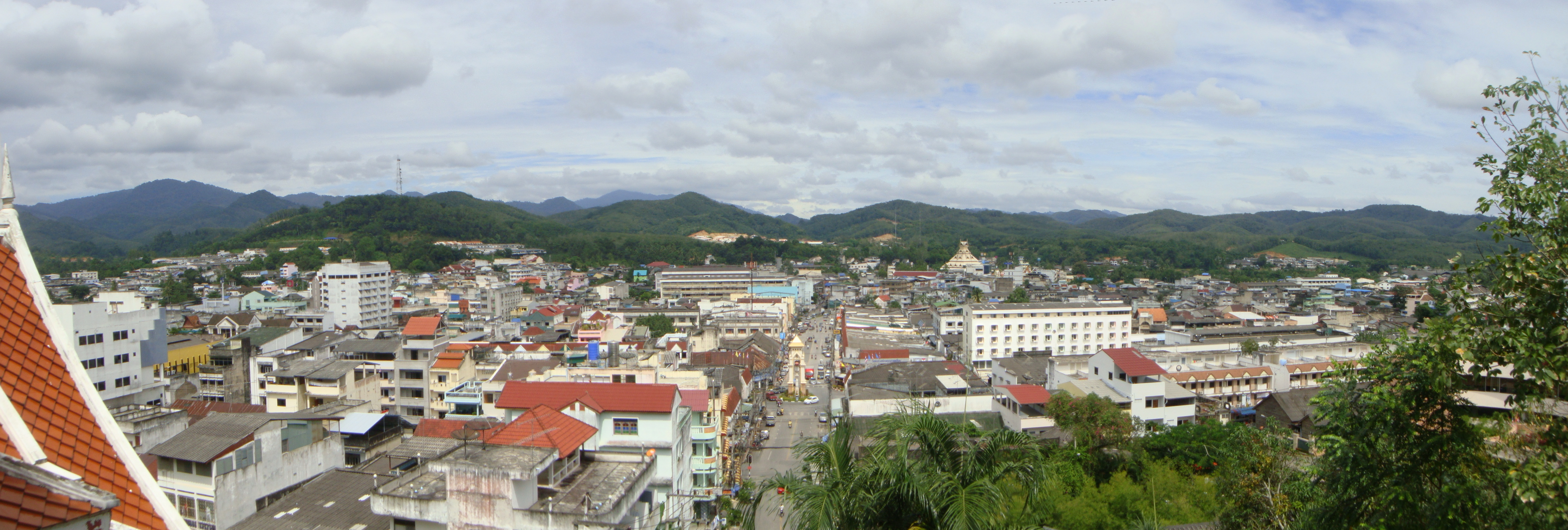
City of Betong, Yala, with the Sankalakhiri Range towering in the background.

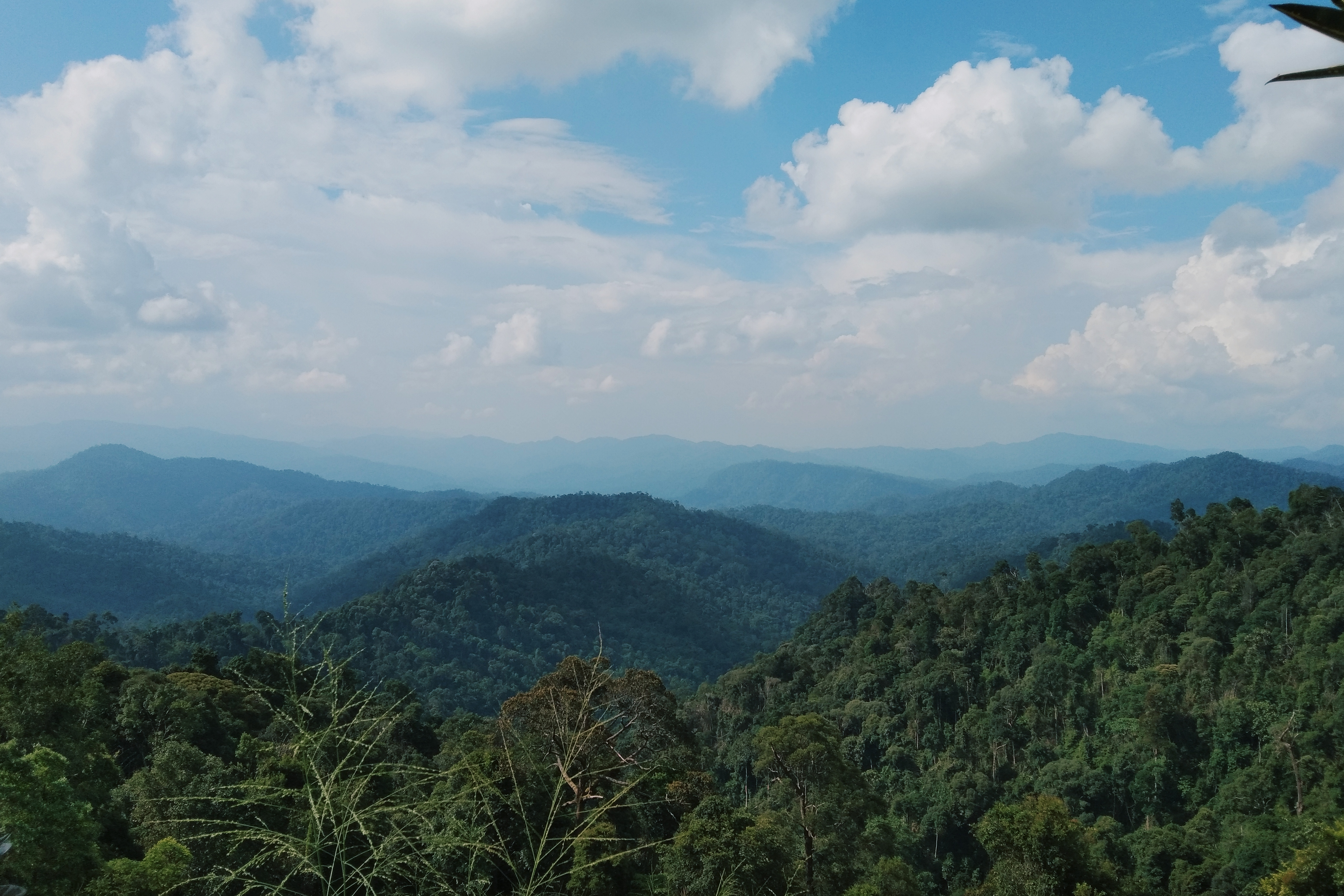
The Titiwangsa Mountains seen from a layby along the East-West Highway near Gerik, Perak.

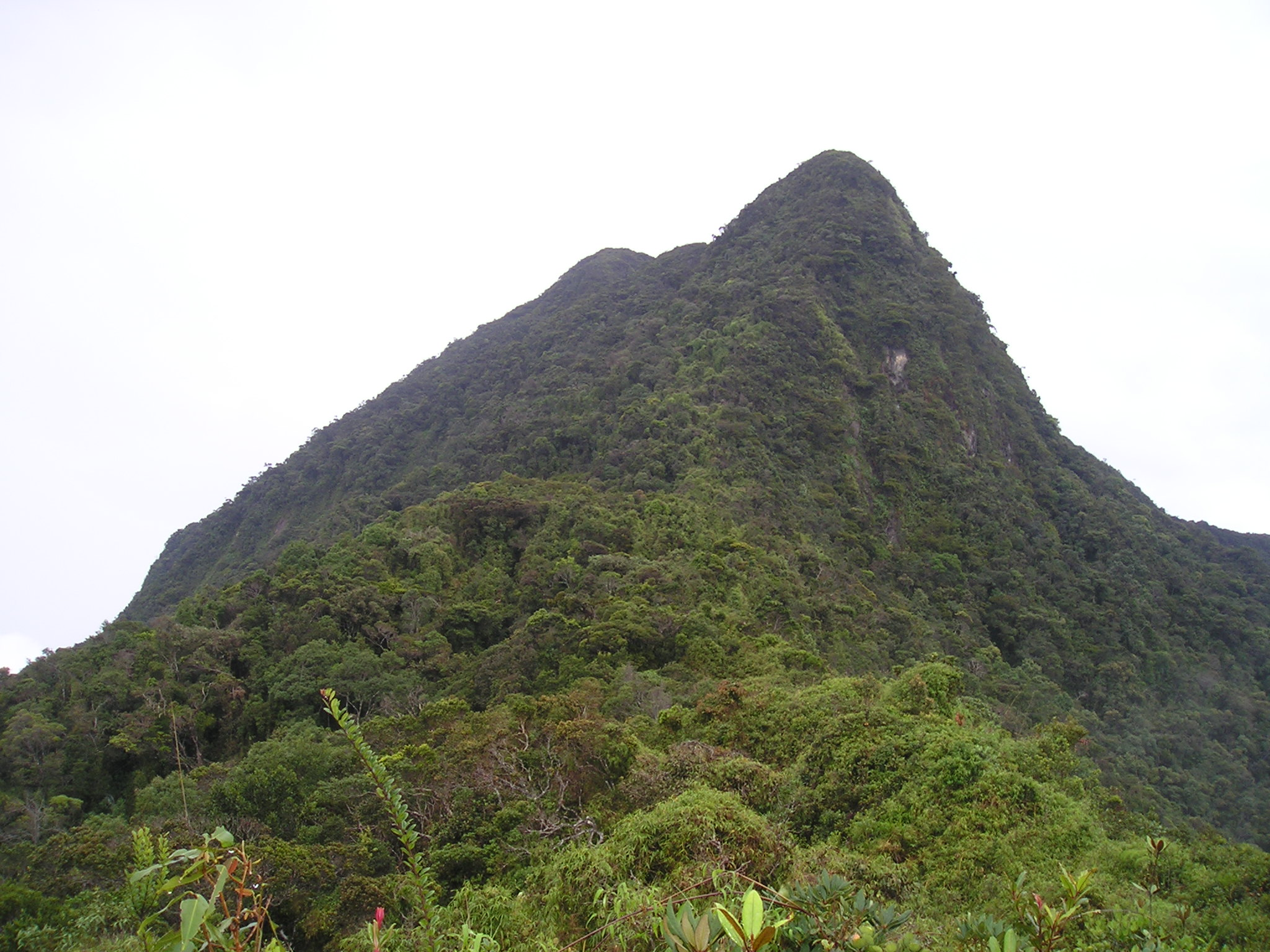
The peak of Mount Korbu, the tallest mountain of the range.

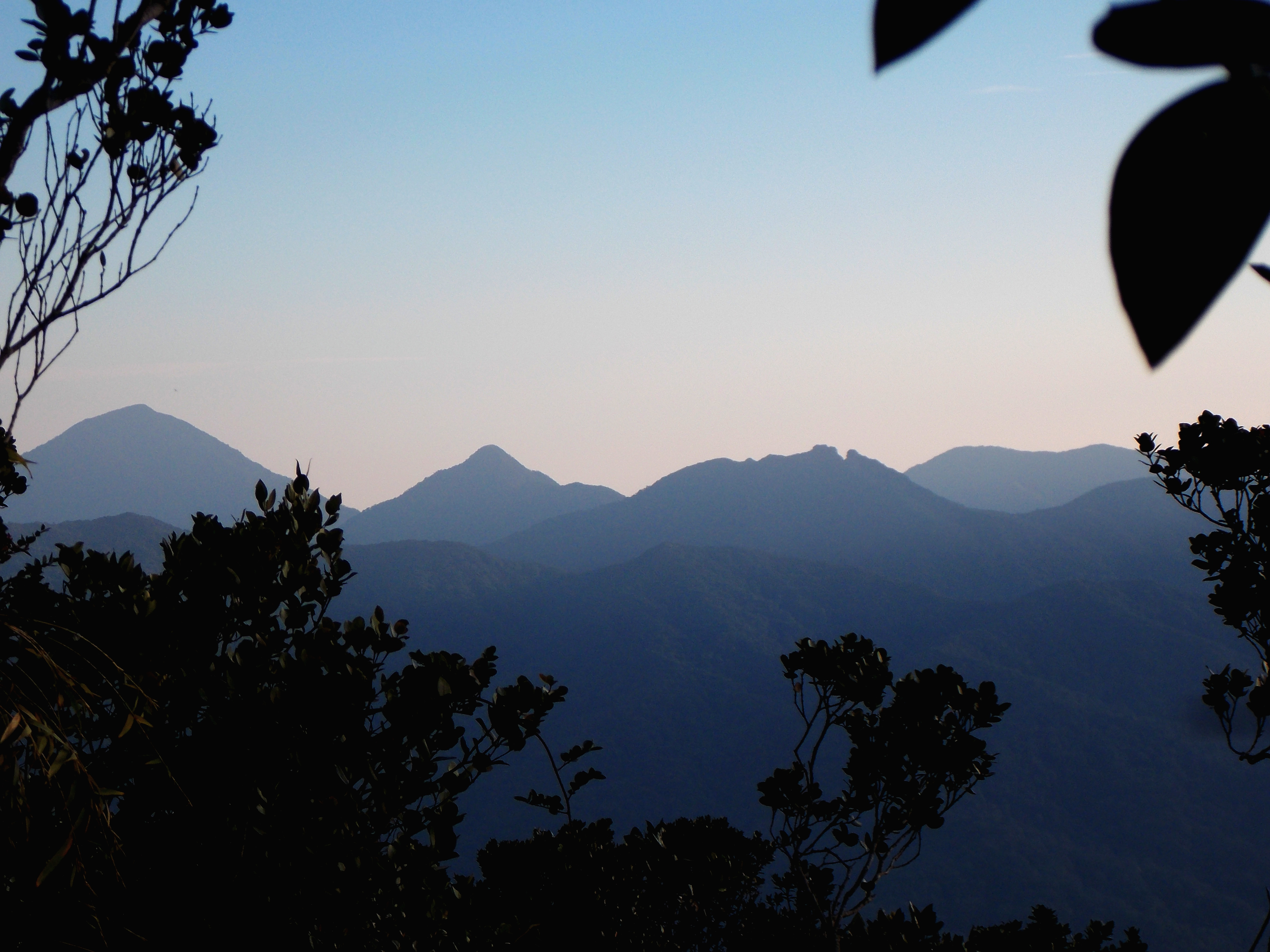
View of Mts.Yong Yap (left), Bubu (middle) and Tok Nenek (right, with a characteristic col) from the northern side of Mount Yong Belar

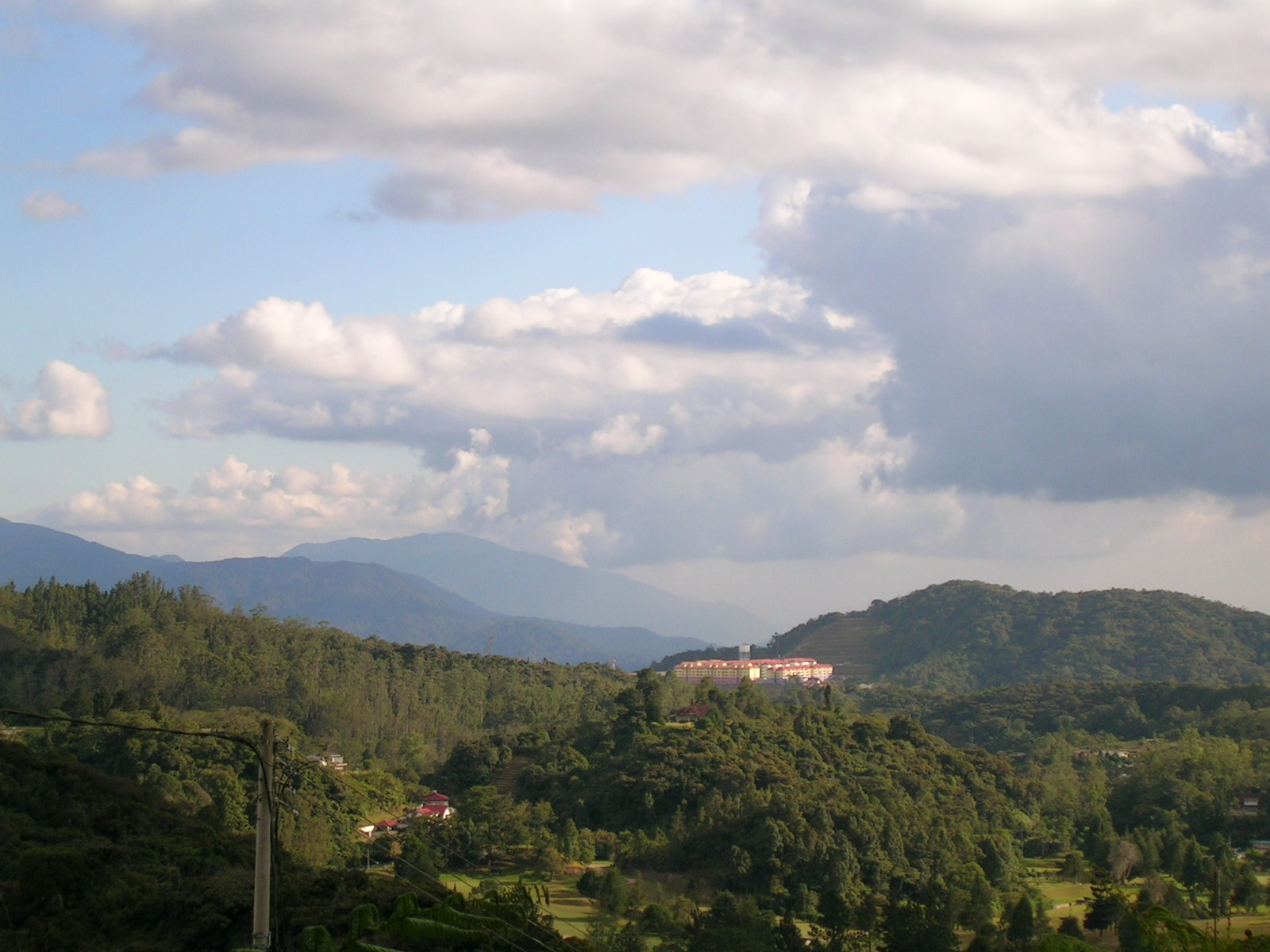
As viewed from Cameron Highlands

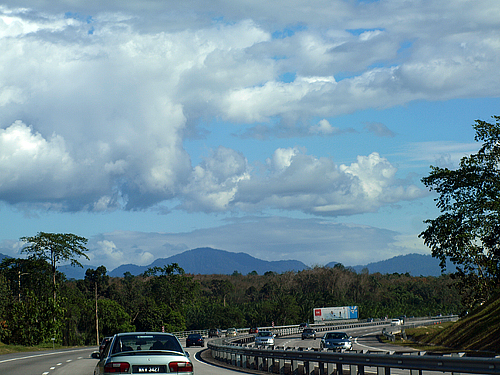
The Titiwangsa Mountains tower over the North-South Expressway in Slim River, Perak.

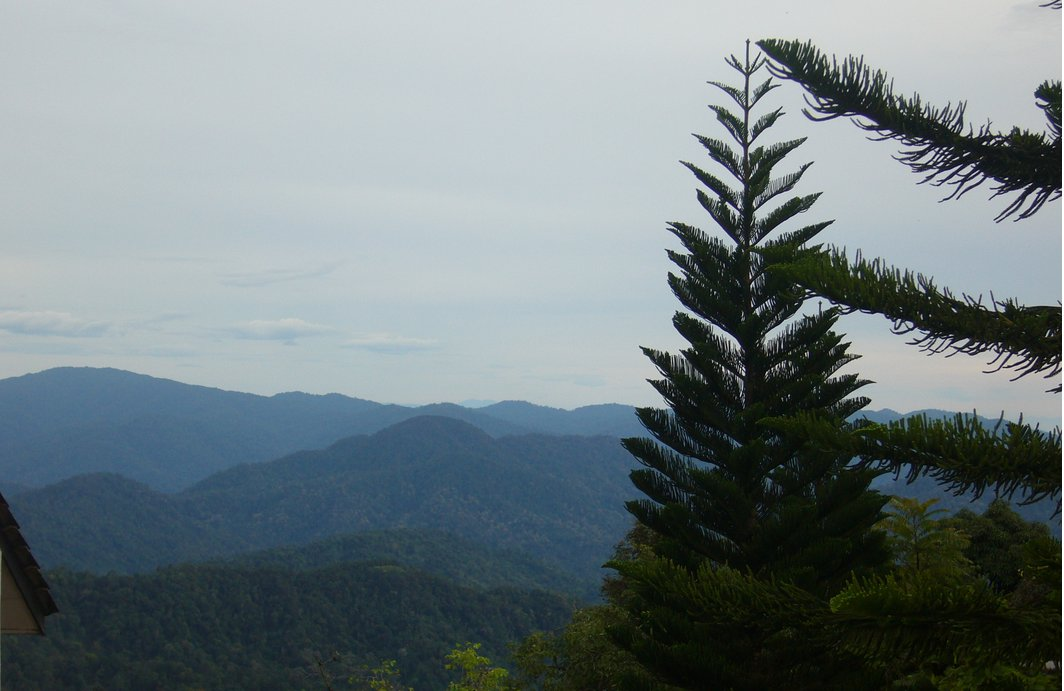
View from Fraser's Hill

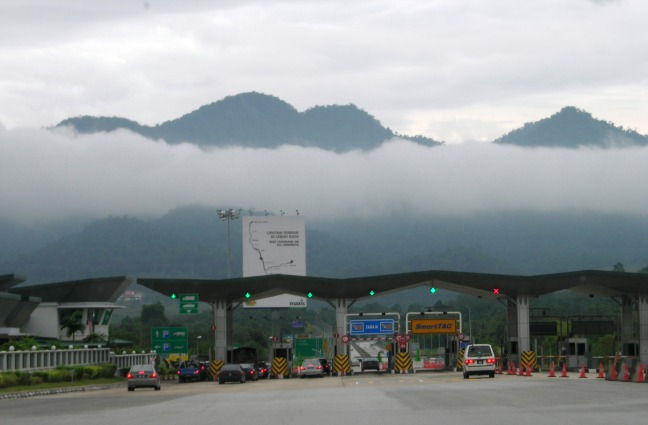
The eastern flank of the Titiwangsa Mountains, as seen from the East Coast Expressway near Karak, Pahang.

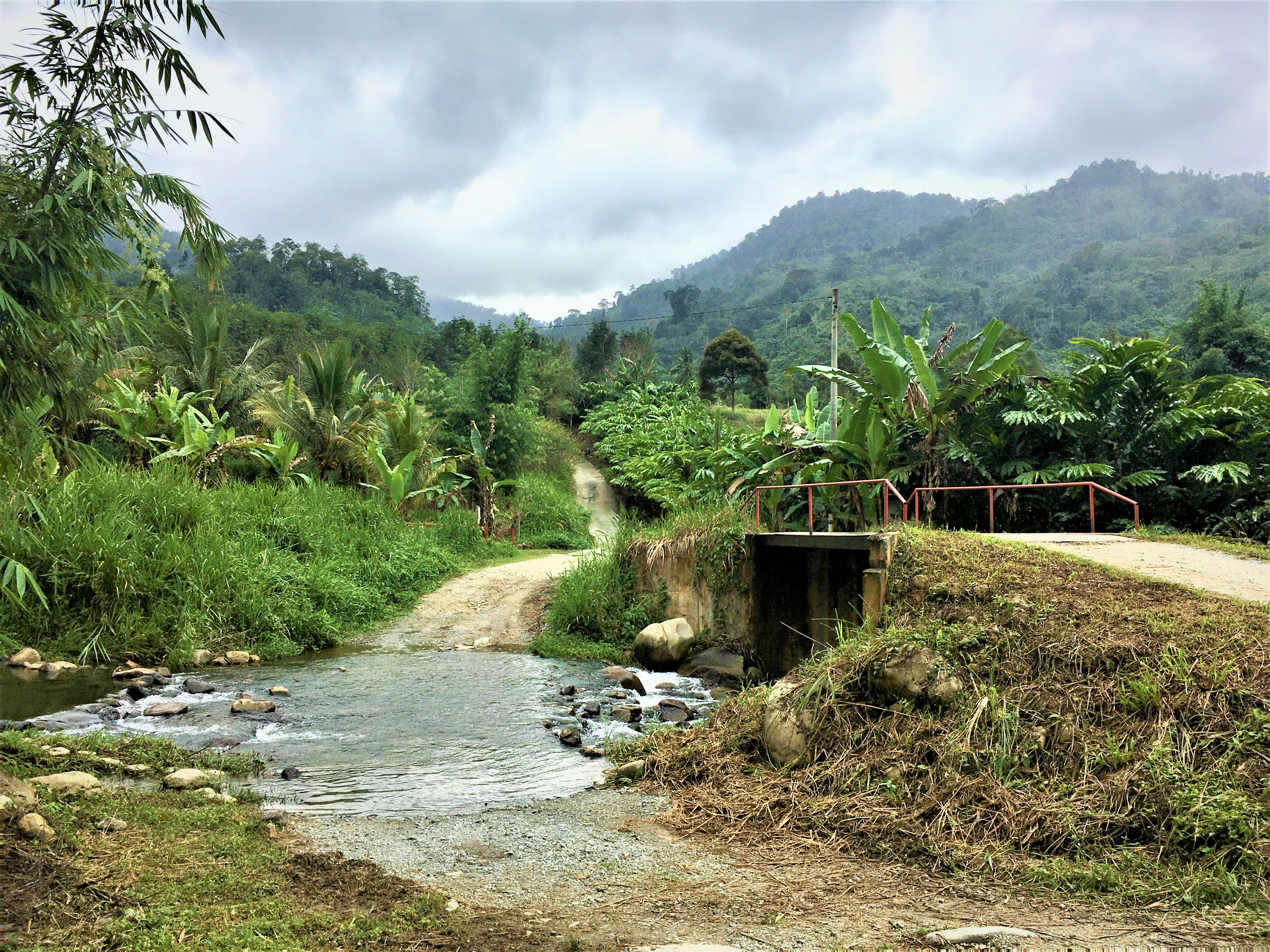
A ford in Janda Baik, Pahang, along the trail to Mount Nuang

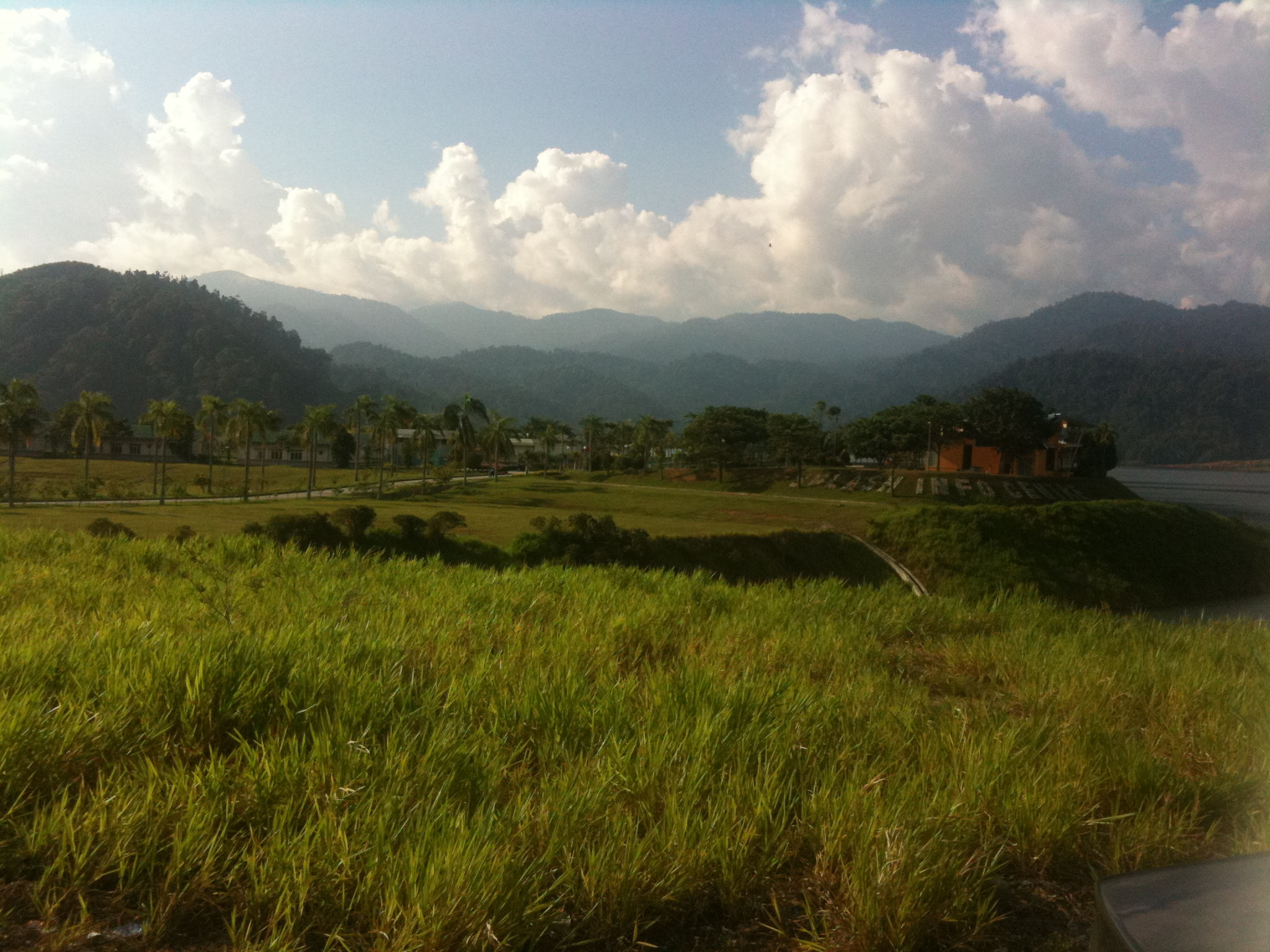
The Titiwangsa Mountains near Kuala Kubu Bharu, Selangor.

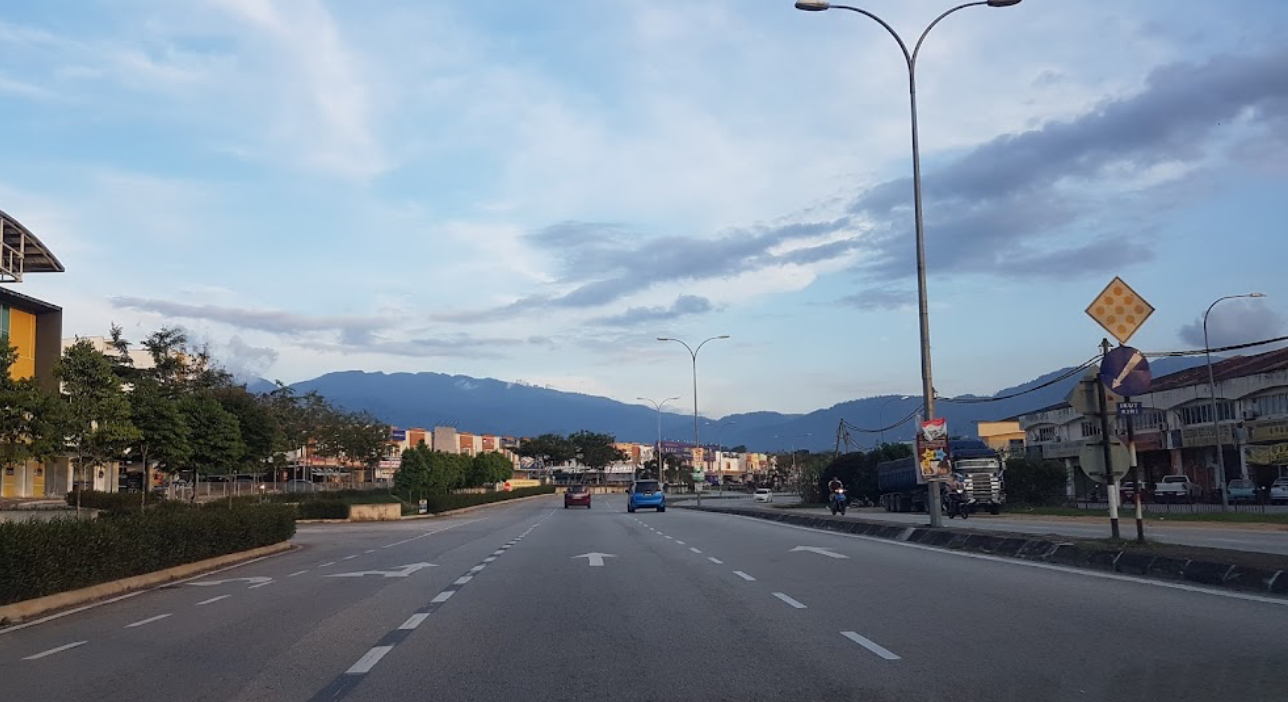
The Titiwangsa Mountains near Batang Kali, Selangor.

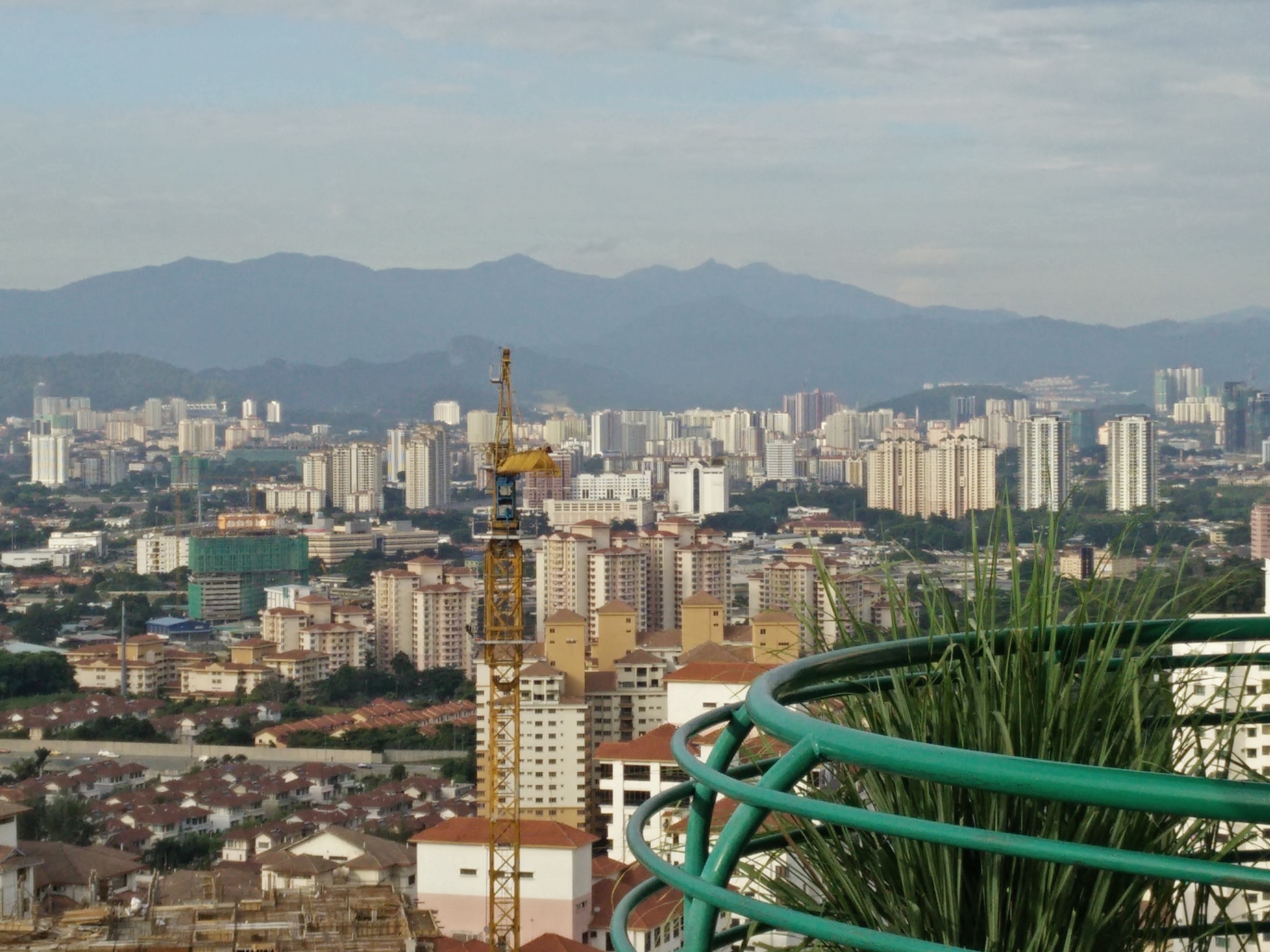
As seen from a residential skyscraper in Kuala Lumpur

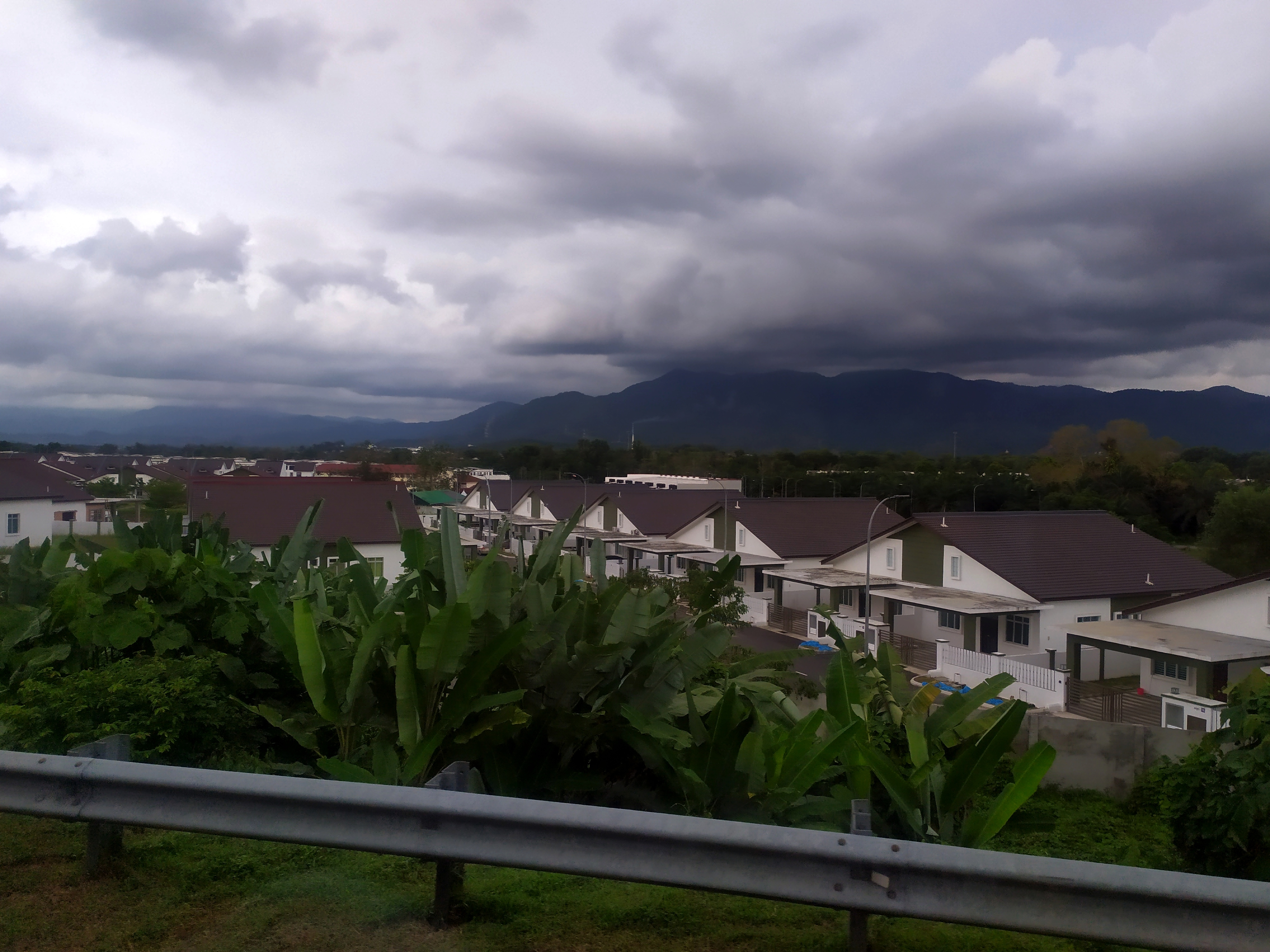
The Titiwangsa Mountains seen from the North-South Expressway near Seremban, Negeri Sembilan. Visible are Mts. Angsi (the mountain with the darker hue), Berembun and Telapak Buruk (background).

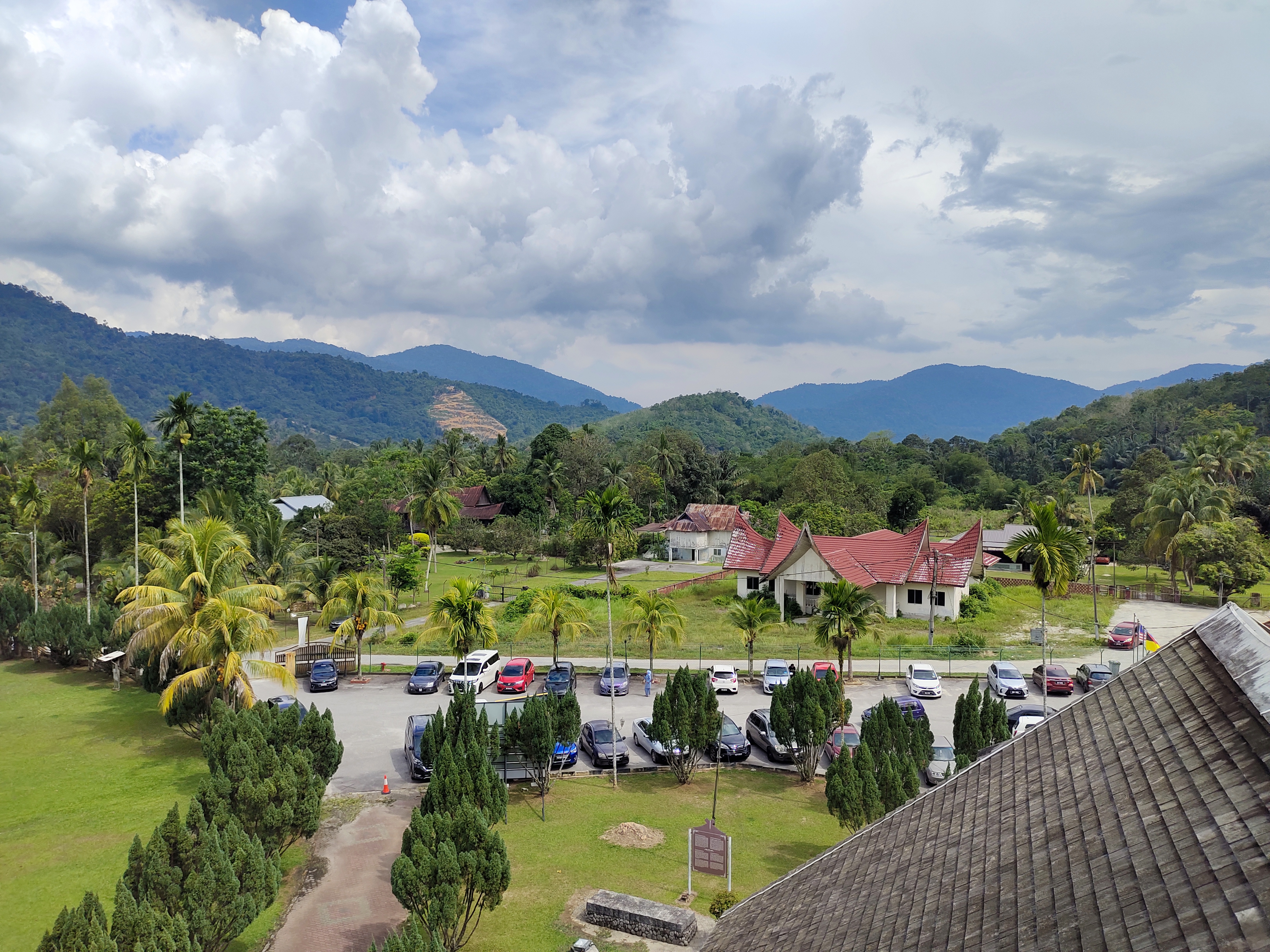
The Titiwangsa Mountains at Seri Menanti, Negeri Sembilan.

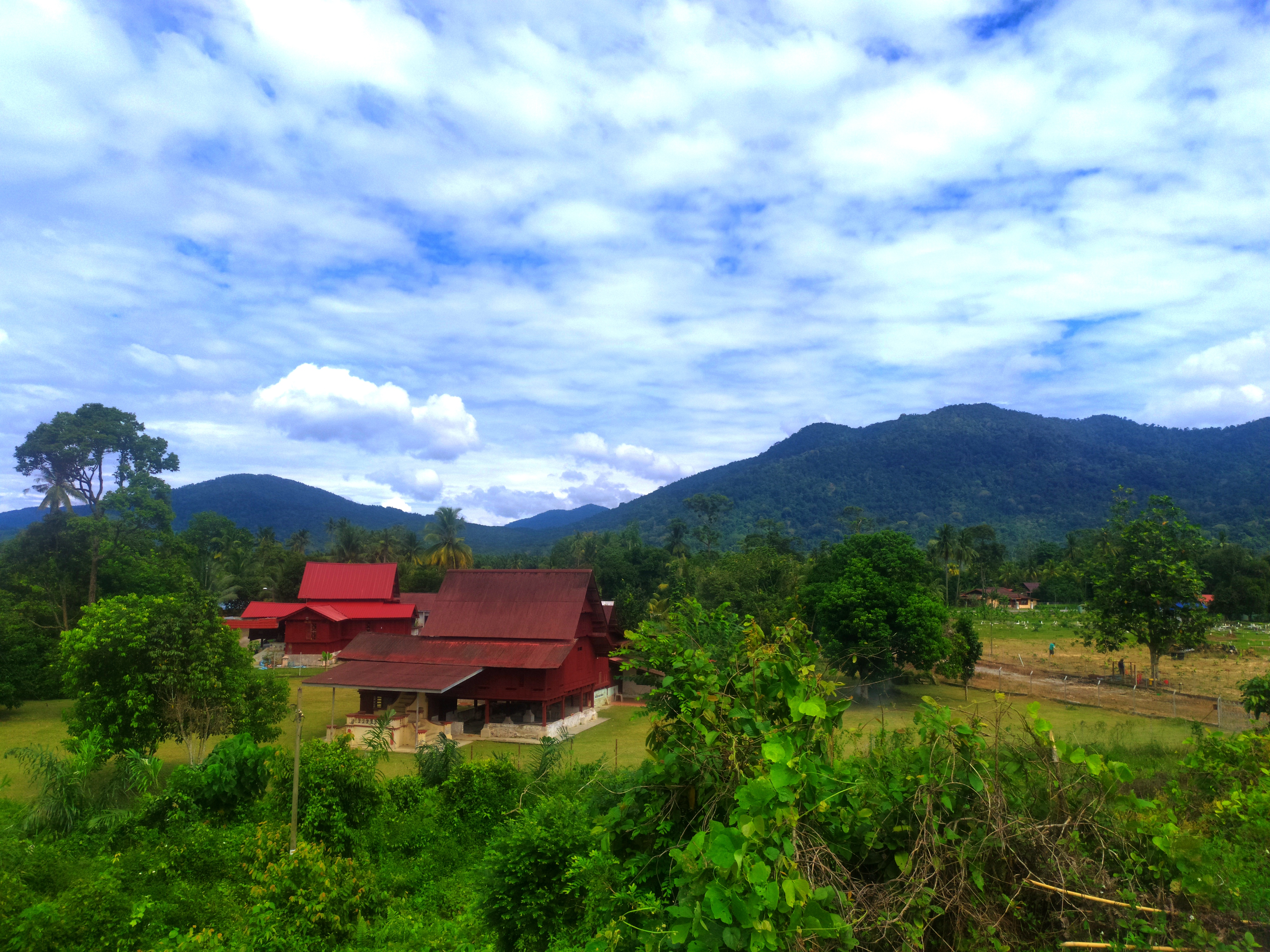
The southern section of the Titiwangsa Mountains in Kota, Negeri Sembilan. Mount Datuk rises to the east, which is on the right side of the picture.

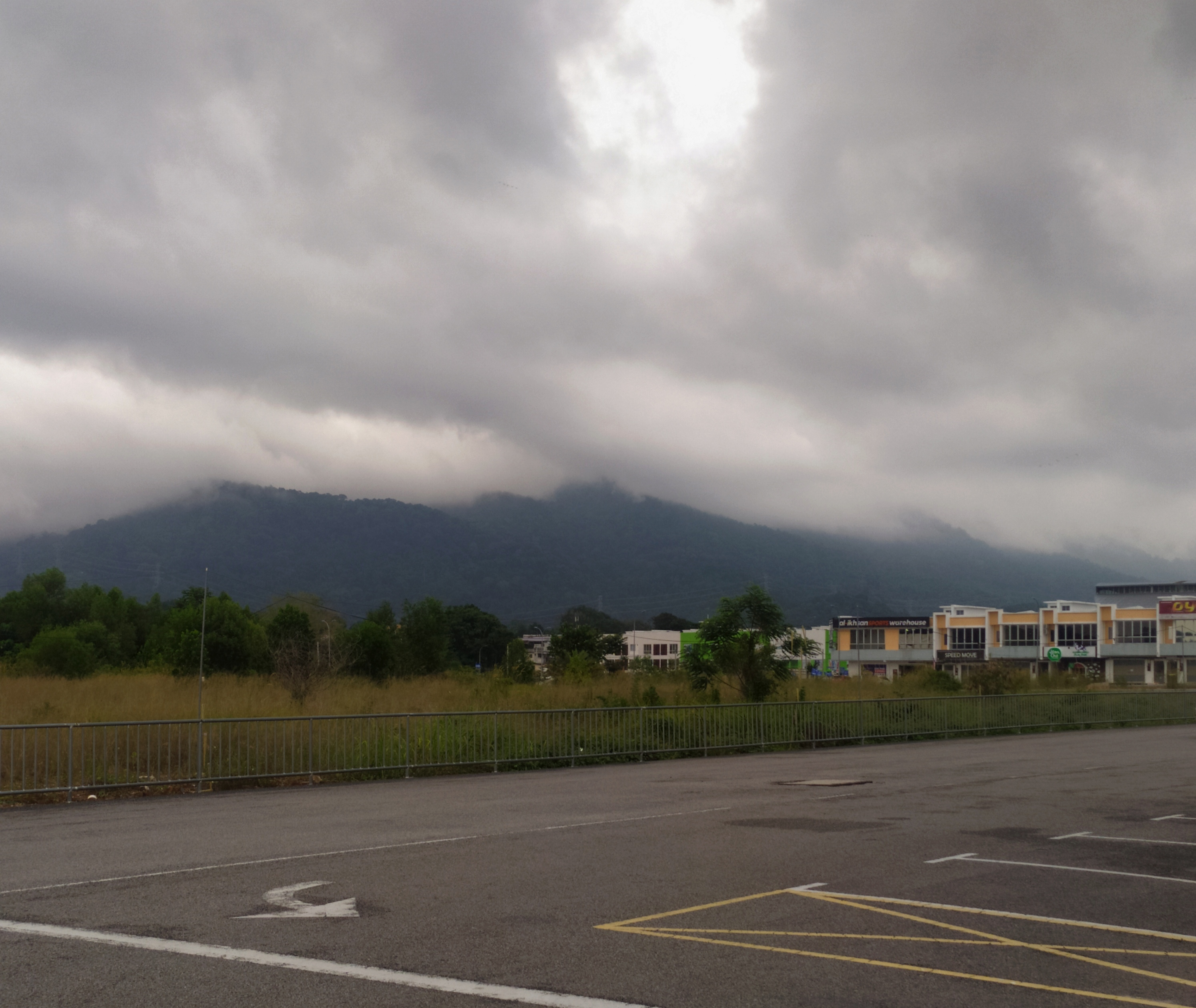
Mount Tampin, Negeri Sembilan, the southern terminus of contiguous Titiwangsa Mountains. Seen from Pulau Sebang, Malacca.
