= Mount Korbu =

Mountain in Perak, Malaysia

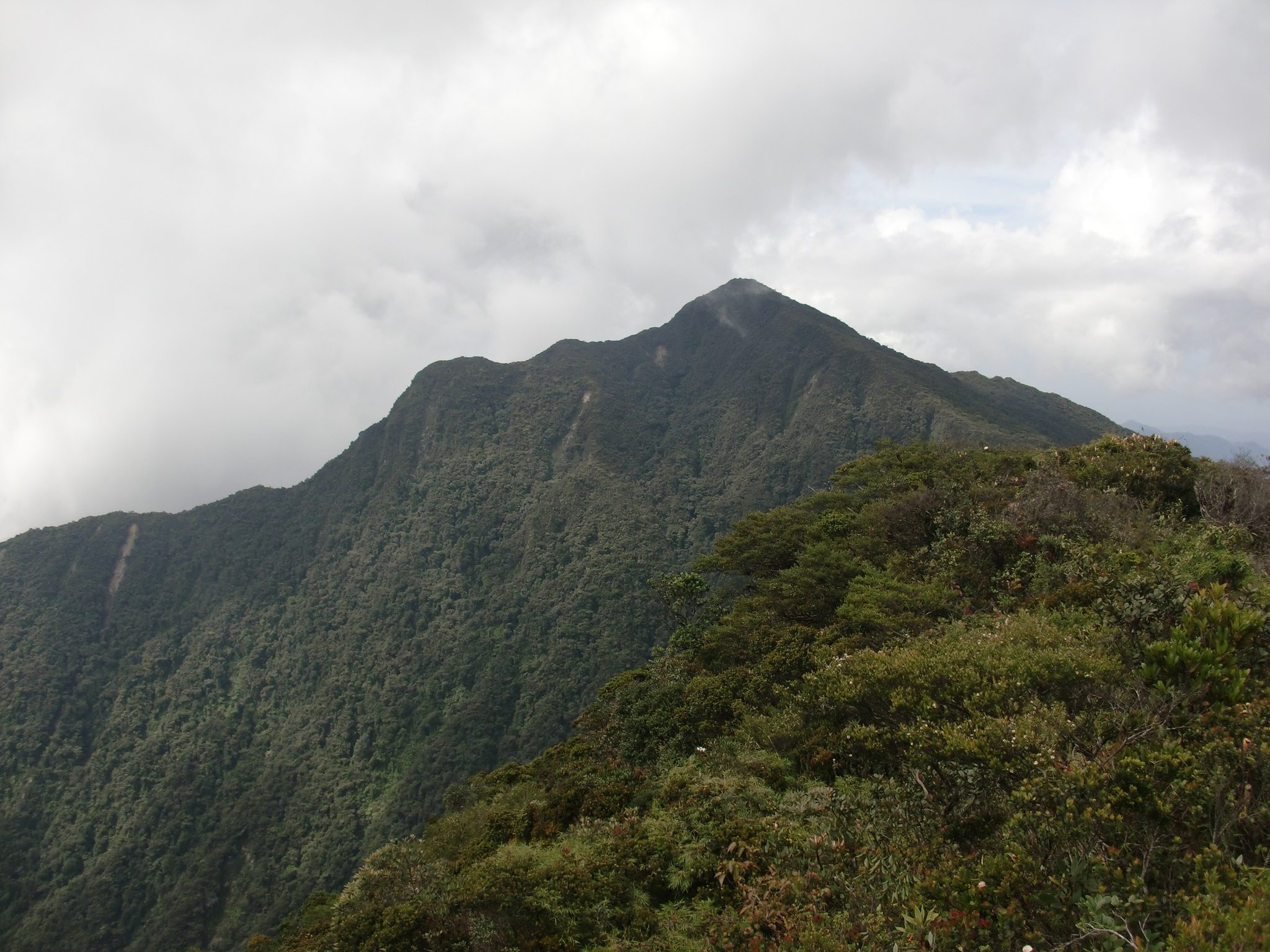
- Korbu's summit, seen from neighbouring Mount Gayong

Highest point
- Elevation: 2,183 m (7,162 ft)
- Prominence: 1,993 m (6,539 ft)
- Listing: Ultra; Ribu
- Coordinates: 4°41′N 101°18′E

Naming
- Native name: Gunung Korbu (Malay)

Geography
- Location within Malaysia
- Location: Ipoh, Kinta District, Perak, Malaysia
- Parent range: Titiwangsa Mountains

Mount Korbu (Malay: Gunung Korbu) is a mountain in Hulu Kinta, Ipoh, Perak, Malaysia, approximately 25 kilometres (16 mi) east of the Ipoh city centre and situated very close to the state border with Kelantan. It is the highest peak in the state of Perak and Kinta District, located on the Titiwangsa Mountains, the southernmost section of the Tenasserim Hills.

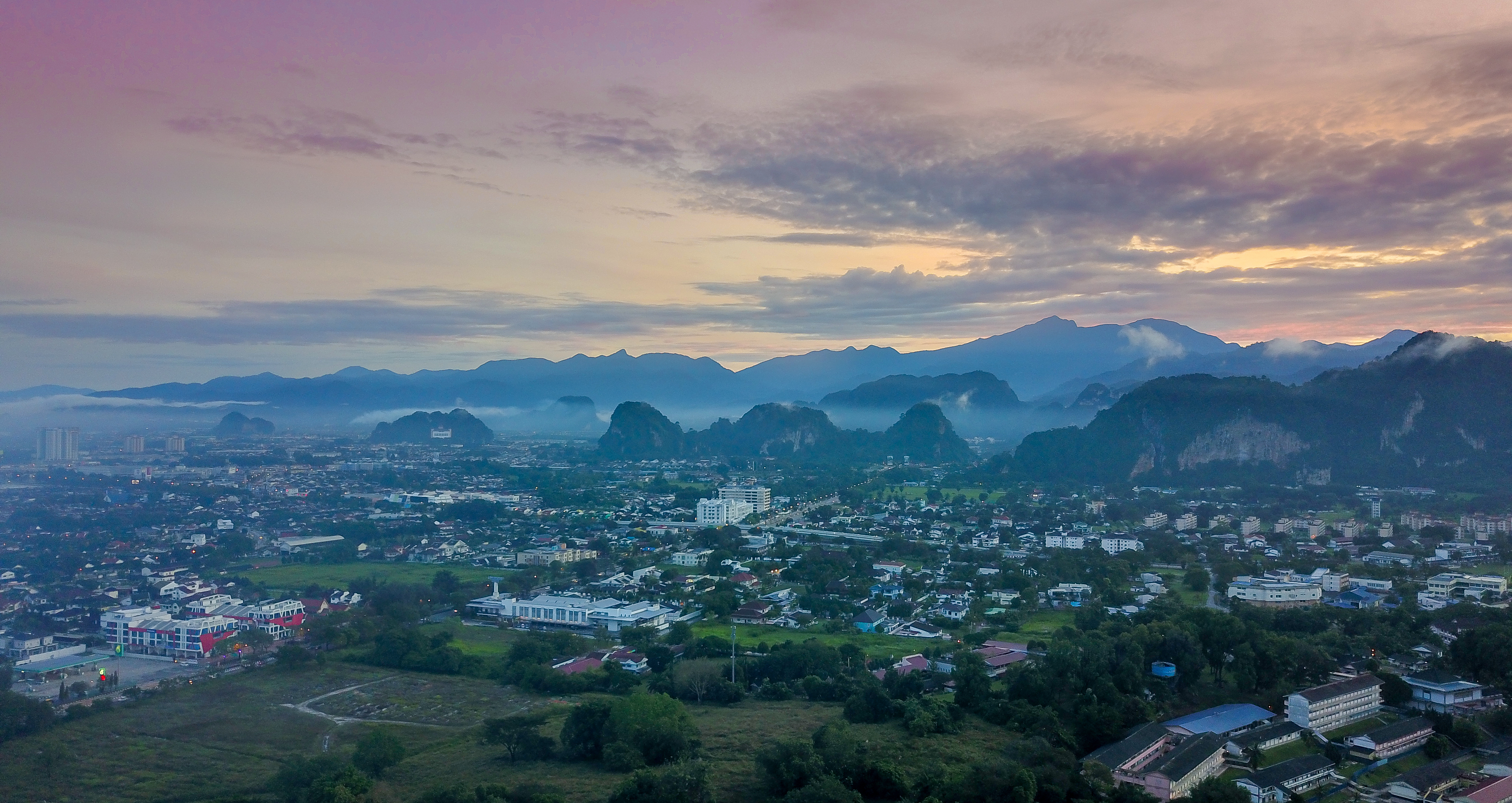
The Titiwangsa Mountains as seen from Ipoh. The Korbu–Gayong massif is identifiable as the tallest mountain towards the right of the image.

Mount Korbu is also the second highest mountain in Peninsular Malaysia, standing at 2,183 metres (4 metres lower than the highest peak, Mount Tahan that stands at 2,187 metres in the state of Pahang). A reasonable level of physical fitness is required to climb/trek Mount Korbu. It used to take an average climber four days and three nights for a return trip, but the duration has been cut short in recent years and some have even made it within 12 hours. Most climbers now make do without any guide as the trail has become very obvious (at some stretches the trails are badly deteriorated due to over-trekking), but, as for other local mountains, there are occasional reports of climbers getting lost.

Between 23 and 26 May 2013, 65 volunteers took part in a trail maintenance and clean-up project on Mount Korbu via the Sungai Termin Trail. It was the second such conservation project of the non-profit Adopt A Mountain (AdAM).

To the north of the Sungai Termin Trail lies the Sungai Seno'oi (or Senoi) Trail, which receives much less foot traffic. This trail ascends to the summit via a different ridge and, as of 2018, remains unaffected by overcrowding. However, the lower sections are densely forested in various spots.

== Nearby ==
Mount Gayong (2,173 m), a neighbouring peak, can be accessed via a 90-minute trek along the saddle linking both mountains, forming a massif collectively known as Korga (a portmanteau of Korbu and Gayong) among the hiking and mountaineering community.

8 km away south of Mount Korbu, straddling the Perak-Kelantan border is Mount Yong Belar, Peninsular Malaysia's third tallest mountain, standing at 2,181 metres (7,156 ft) aboveu sea level.

== Gallery ==
The summit, viewed from Gayong.

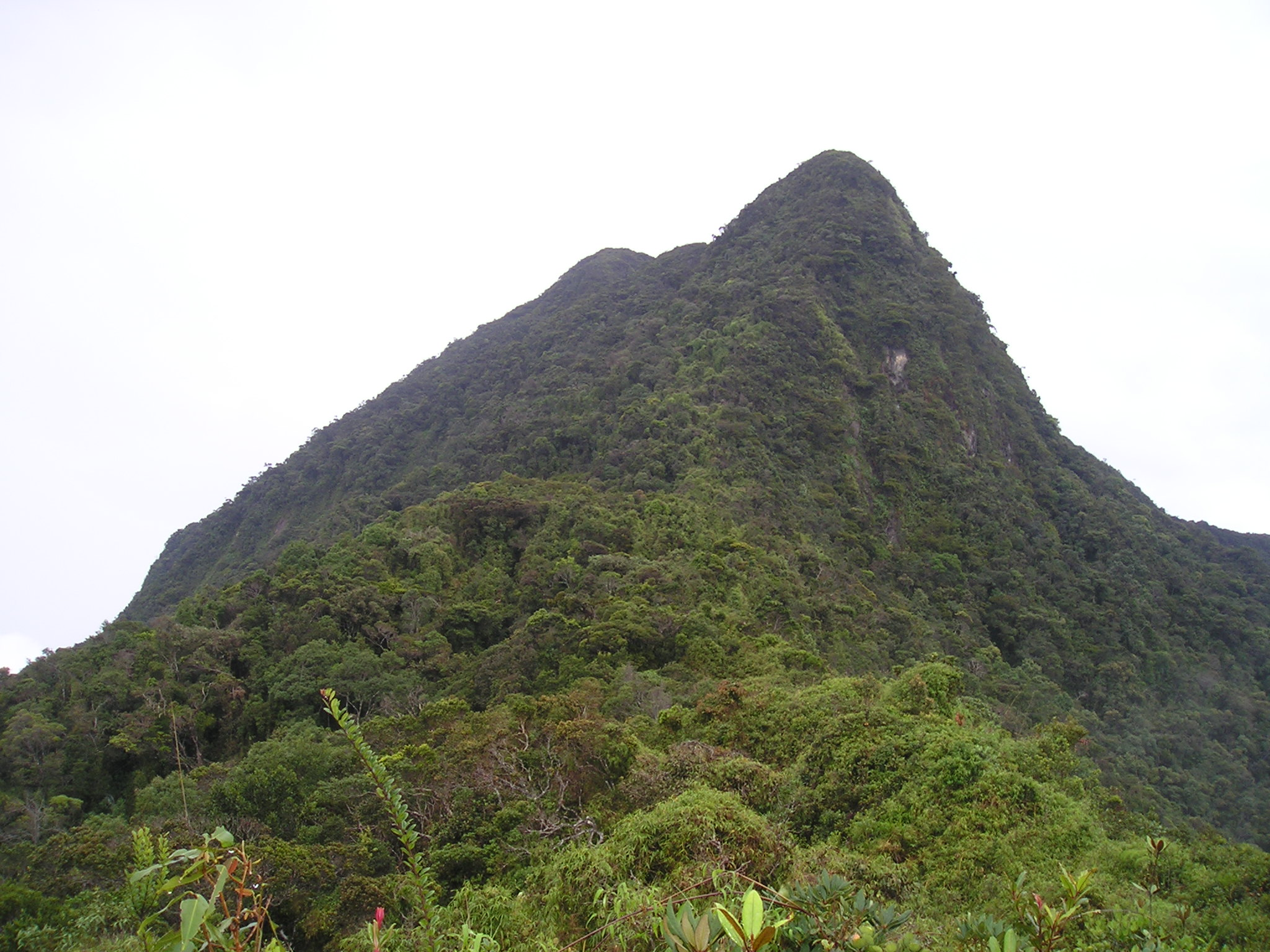
Chuban Peak

Stratus silvagenitus clouds over the massif

Sunset view from the summit

== See also ==
- List of mountains of Malaysia
