= Mount Yong Belar =

Mountain in Kelantan and Perak, Malaysia

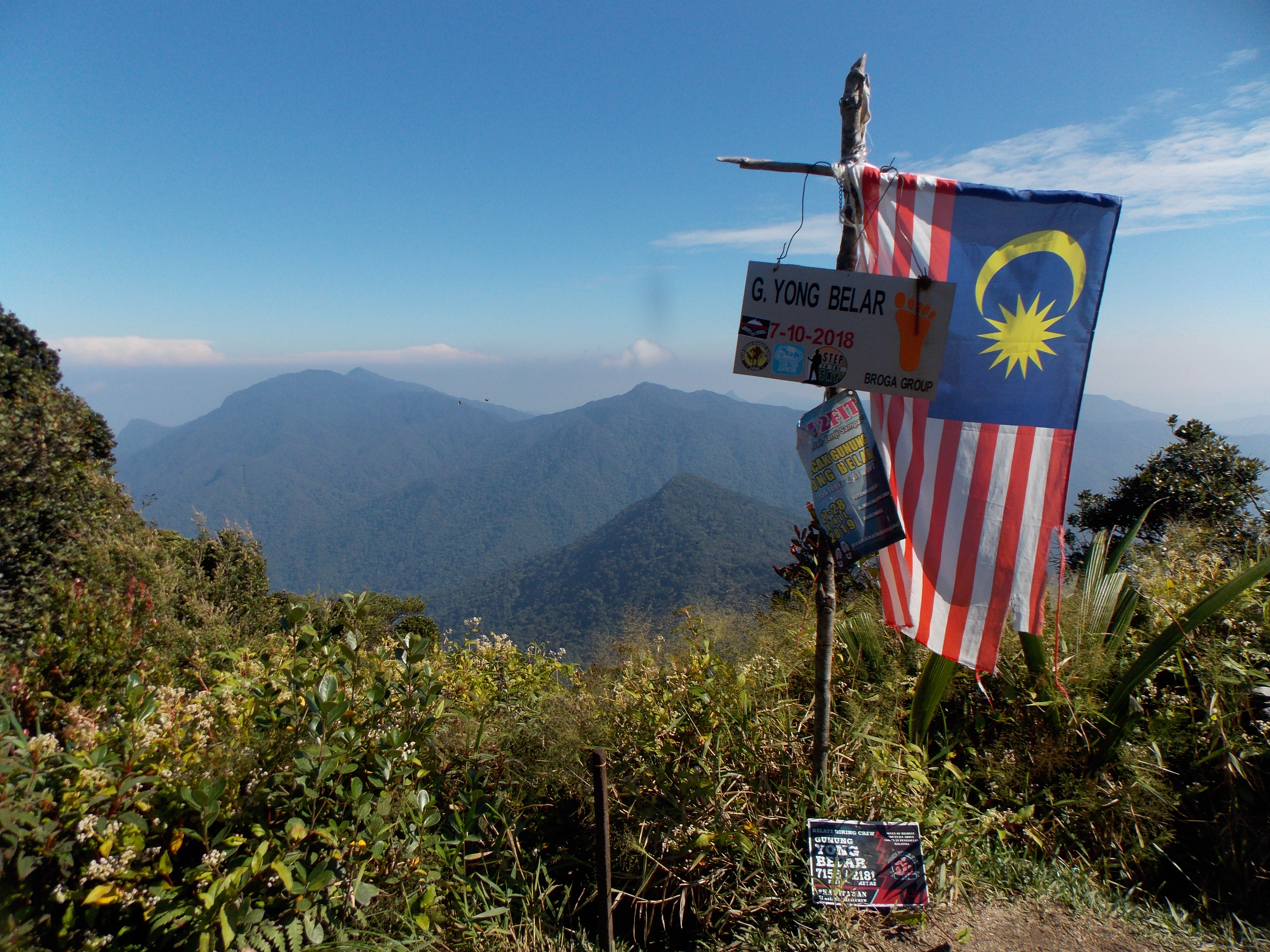
- Summit of Yong Belar

Highest point
- Elevation: 2,181 m (7,156 ft)
- Prominence: 615 m (2,018 ft)
- Listing: Spesial Ribu
- Coordinates: 4°39′00″N 101°21′42″E

Naming
- Native name: Gunung Yong Belar (Malay)

Geography
- Location within Malaysia
- Location: Lojing Autonomous Subdistrict, Kelantan; Kinta District, Perak
- Parent range: Titiwangsa Mountains

Mount Yong Belar (Malay: Gunung Yong Belar) is a mountain on the border of the states Kelantan and Perak in the Titiwangsa Mountains of Malaysia. Its summit is 2,181 m (7,156 ft) above sea level, making it the highest mountain in the state of Kelantan, and the third highest in Peninsular Malaysia, behind Mounts Tahan and Korbu, the latter being located 8 km north.

== See also ==
- List of mountains of Malaysia
- List of ultras of Southeast Asia
