= List of mountains in Malaysia =

The following is a sortable list of the mountains and hills of Malaysia.

== List of mountains ==
Highest peak in state

List of mountains in Malaysia
Rank	Name	Range	State	Height (m)	Height (ft)	Remarks
1	Mount Kinabalu	Crocker Mountains	Sabah	4,095.2	13,435.7	Fourth highest peak in Southeast Asia. Highest peak in Malaysia and Borneo. 20th most prominent peak in the world. Unique endemic plants and animals. With nice weather, view includes the TAR Marine Park Islands. The only place in Malaysia to have recorded snowfall since the 1980s.
2	Mount Trusmadi	Trusmadi Range	Sabah	2,642	8,669	
3	Mount Sinsing	Trusmadi Range	Sabah	2,603	8,540	The new 3rd highest peak record found
4	Mount Tambuyukon	Crocker Mountains	Sabah	2,579	8,462	
5	Mount Kaingaran	Trusmadi Range	Sabah	2,468	8,097	The new 5th highest peak record found
6	Mount Murud	Tama Abu Range	Sarawak	2,424	7,946	Highest peak in Sarawak
7	Mount Mulu	Tama Abu Range	Sarawak	2,376	7,795	Has unique rock formations called the Pinnacles
8	Gunung Minodtuhan	Crocker Mountains	Sabah	2,360	7,743	
9	Mount Tahan	Tahan Range	Pahang-Kelantan border	2,187	7,175	Highest peak in Peninsular Malaysia and Pahang. Unique plants and animals. One of Peninsular Malaysia's seven tallest mountains above 2,100 m (6,890 ft), known as the G7 among hikers.
10	Mount Korbu	Titiwangsa Mountains	Perak	2,183	7,162	Highest peak in Perak and the whole Titiwangsa Range, second tallest mountain in Peninsular Malaysia after Mount Tahan
11	Mount Yong Belar	Titiwangsa Mountains	Kelantan-Perak border	2,181	7,156	Highest peak in Kelantan
12	Mount Gayong	Titiwangsa Mountains	Perak	2,173	7,129	
13	Mount Chamah	Titiwangsa Mountains	Kelantan	2,171	7,123	
14	Mount Yong Yap	Titiwangsa Mountains	Kelantan-Perak border	2,168	7,113	
15	Mount Ulu Sepat	Titiwangsa Mountains	Kelantan-Perak border	2,161	7,090	
16	Mount Batu Putih	Titiwangsa Mountains	Perak	2,131	6,990	
17	Mount Tama Abu	Tama Abu Range	Sarawak	2,112	6,930	
18	Mount Irau	Titiwangsa Mountains	Pahang-Perak border	2,110	6,923	Easily accessible mossy forest
19	Mount Benum	Benom Range	Pahang	2,107	6,914	
20	Mount Apad Runan	Tama Abu Range	Sarawak	2,103	6,900	
21	Mount Gerah	Titiwangsa Mountains	Kelantan-Perak border	2,103	6,898	
22	Mount Junction	Titiwangsa Mountains	Pahang-Perak border	2,088	6,850	
23	Batu Buli Hill	Tama Abu Range	Sarawak	2,082	6,823	
24	Mount Bilah	Titiwangsa Mountains	Kelantan-Perak border	2,081	6,817	
25	Mount Berembun	Titiwangsa Mountains	Pahang	2,078	6,817	
26	Mount Bieh	Titiwangsa Mountains	Perak	2,073	6,800	
27	Mount Wakid	Crocker Mountains	Sabah	2,066	6,778	
28	Mount Gedung	Tahan Range	Pahang	2,065	6,776	
29	Batu Lawi Hill	Tama Abu Range	Sarawak	2,046	6,712	
30	Mount Berinchang	Titiwangsa Mountains	Pahang-Perak border	2,031	6,663	
31	Batu Iran Hill	Iran Mountains	Sarawak	2,018	6,620	
32	Mount Tangga	Titiwangsa Mountains	Pahang	2,014	6,609	
33	Mount Swettenham	Titiwangsa Mountains	Pahang-Kelantan border	1,961	6,434	
34	Mount Shoid		Kelantan	1,947	6,387	
35	Mount Ulu Kerchau	Tahan Range	Pahang	1,945	6,380	
36	Mount Liang Timur	Titiwangsa Mountains	Perak-Pahang border	1,933	6,343	
37	Mount Liang Barat	Titiwangsa Mountains	Perak	1,933	6,342	
38	Mount Berhid	Titiwangsa Mountains	Kelantan-Perak border	1,931	6,335	
39	Mount Tumang Batak	Titiwangsa Mountains	Pahang-Perak border	1,923	6,309	
40	Mount Challi/Pondok	Titiwangsa Mountains	Kelantan-Perak border	1,923	6,309	
41	Mount Siku	Titiwangsa Mountains	Pahang	1,915	6,284	
42	Mount Tok Nenek	Titiwangsa Mountains	Perak	1,904	6,248	Has a unique peak made of rocks. Offers 360 degree view of Titiwangsa Mountains.
43	Mount Lumaku	Crocker Mountains	Sabah	1,900	6,234	
44	Mount Noring	Titiwangsa Mountains	Perak	1,888	6,197	
45	Mount Belatok	Titiwangsa Mountains	Perak	1,883	6,176	
46	Mount Bintang	Bintang Mountains	Kedah-Perak border	1,862	6,110	Highest peak in Kedah
47	Mount Noring Timur	Titiwangsa Mountains	Perak	1,861	6,106	
48	Pagon Hill		Brunei-Sarawak border	1,850	6,070	
49	Mount Berembun/Beremban	Titiwangsa Mountains	Pahang	1,840	6,037	
50	Mount Basor	Titiwangsa Mountains	Kelantan	1,840	6,038	
51	Mount Semangkok	Titiwangsa Mountains	Pahang-Selangor border	1,830	6,004	Highest peak in Selangor
52	Mount Tiga Negeri	Titiwangsa Mountains	Pahang-Perak-Kelantan border	1,802	5,912	The peak is situated on the borders of three states.
53	Mount Inas	Bintang Mountains	Kedah-Perak border	1,801	5,907	
54	Mount Suku	Titiwangsa Mountains	Perak	1,797	5,896	
55	Lamas Hill	Trusmadi Range	Sabah	1,797	5,896	
56	Mount Kerihun	Kapuas Hulu Range	Sarawak-West Kalimantan border	1,790	5,870	
57	Monkobo Hill	Crocker Mountains	Sabah	1,788	5,866	
58	Mount Lotung	Tama Abu Range	Sabah	1,781	5,843	
59	Mount Ulu Kali	Titiwangsa Mountains	Selangor-Pahang border	1,772	5,814	Located near Genting Highlands
60	Mount Kuar		Kelantan	1,771	5,813	
61	Mount Bujang		Pahang	1,771	5,812	
62	Mount Lawit	Kapuas Hulu Range	Sarawak-West Kalimantan border	1,767	5,800	
63	Mount Rajah	Titiwangsa Mountains	Pahang-Selangor border	1,683	5,522	
64	Mount Bubu	Bintang Mountains	Perak	1,657	5,435	
65	Mount Ulu Jernih	Bintang Mountains	Perak	1,577	5,173	
66	Mount Tangga 15	Tahan Range	Pahang	1,539	5,049	
67	Mount Lawit	Pantai Timur Range	Terengganu	1,519	4,984	Highest peak in Terengganu
68	Mount Tapis	Pantai Timur Range	Pahang	1,512	4,960	Not usually frequented by hikers. Wild and unspoilt. Many leeches.
69	Mount Ayam	Titiwangsa Mountains	Kelantan	1,504	4,934	Peak is one-of-a-kind. Full of bonsai-like Leptospermum sp.
70	Mount Nuang	Titiwangsa Mountains	Selangor-Pahang border	1,493	4,898	
71	Mount Besar Hantu	Titiwangsa Mountains	Negeri Sembilan-Pahang border	1,462	4,797	Highest peak in Negeri Sembilan
72	Mount Pangkin	Tahan Range	Pahang	1,462	4,797	
73	Gunung Mandi Angin	Pantai Timur Range	Terengganu-Pahang border	1,460	4,790	
74	Pine Tree Hill	Titiwangsa Mountains	Pahang-Selangor border	1,445	4,777	
75	Mount Bunga Buah	Titiwangsa Mountains	Selangor	1,430	4,690	
76	Mount Setong	Titiwangsa Mountains	Kelantan	1,422	4,665	
77	Meliau Hill	Crocker Mountains	Sabah	1,321	4,334	
78	Mount Ledang		Johor	1,276	4,186	Highest peak in Johor, historically known as Mount Ophir
79	Bukit Larut	Bintang Mountains	Perak	1,250	4,101	Initially known as Maxwell Hill in the colonial era
80	Mount Jerai		Kedah	1,217	3,992	
81	Mount Reskit	Tahan Range	Pahang	1,216	3,990	
82	Bukit Bokbak	Bintang Mountains	Kedah	1,199	3,933	
83	Mount Telapak Buruk	Titiwangsa Mountains	Negeri Sembilan	1,193	3,914	Third tallest in Negeri Sembilan. A wreckage of a B24 Liberator sits underneath the rainforests in the vicinity of the mountain.
84	Mount Ginivisan	Trusmadi Range	Sabah	1,147	3,763	
85	Tololo Hill	Trusmadi Range	Sabah	1,145	3,757	
86	Mount Malasak	Lawas	Sarawak	1,100	3608.924	
87	Mount Danum		Sabah	1,093	3,586	
88	Bukit Kutu	Titiwangsa Mountains	Selangor	1,090	3576	One of the popular mountains in Selangor above 1km high. An abandoned colonial-era mansion resides at its peak.
89	Mount Serudum		Pahang	1,055	3,462	
90	Mount Tebu	Pantai Timur Range	Terengganu	1,039	3,408	Peak almost similar to Mount Ayam
91	Mount Belumut		Johor	1,010	3,313	
92	Mount Gading		Sarawak	965	3,166	
93	Mount Serapi		Sarawak	911	2,989	
94	Mount Silam		Sabah	884	2900	
95	Mount Datuk	Titiwangsa Mountains	Negeri Sembilan	884	2900	The most defining feature of Mount Datuk is the tor at its summit. On a clear day, hikers can see the Strait of Malacca from this point.
96	Mount Raya		Kedah	881	2,890	Highest peak in Langkawi
97	Mount Chemendung		Johor	846	2,766	
98	Western Hill		Penang	830	2,723	Highest peak in Penang
99	Mount Angsi	Titiwangsa Mountains	Negeri Sembilan	824	2,702	
100	Mount Santubong		Sarawak	810	2,657	
101	Mount Tampin	Titiwangsa Mountains	Negeri Sembilan	764	2506	The southern terminus of Titiwangsa Mountains, and the starting point of Trans-Naning hiking trail, which ends at Mount Datuk to its north
102	Mount Perlis		Perlis	733	2,405	Highest peak in Perlis
103	Mount Mat Chinchang		Kedah	713	2,339	
104	Mount Pulai		Johor	654	2,146	
105	Ma'okil Hill		Johor	585	1,913	
106	Rajah Hill	Tahan Range	Pahang	576	1,890	
107	Mount Singai		Sarawak	562	1,844	
108	Bombalai Hill		Sabah	531	1,742	Extinct volcano
109	Mount Panti		Johor	513	1,684	Also known as Gunung Panti. Hikers can see a lot of leeches during the rainy season.
110	Mount Lambak		Johor	510	1,673	A popular place to train for tougher mountains
111	Mount Mostyn		Sabah	495	1,624	Extinct volcano
112	Bukit Gapis		Melaka	480	1,574	Also known as Mount Melaka, it is the highest peak in Melaka.
113	Mount TTS	TTS Mountains	Kedah	434.1	1,424	The highest peak in the TTS Mountains range. 6°17'01"N 100°28'37"E.
114	Banang Hill		Johor	425	1,390	
115	Tukau Hill		Johor	419	1,370	
116	Broga Hill	Titiwangsa Mountains	Selangor	400	1,312	A beautiful hill near Kuala Lumpur that is covered with cogongrass
117	Bratak Hill		Sarawak	400	1,312	
118	Bukit Tabur Barat	Titiwangsa Mountains	Kuala Lumpur-Selangor border	396	1,300	A quartz ridge on the north eastern part of Kuala Lumpur. Unique endemic plants on its peaks.
119	Kupong Hill		Johor	370	1,210	
120	Penggaram Hill		Johor	367	1,200	
121	Belading Hill		Johor	363	1,187	
122	Reban Kambing Hill		Johor	349	1,141	
123	Mount Madai		Sabah	319	1,047	A popular place in Kunak District
124	Soga Hill		Johor	276	903	A popular hiking spot in Batu Pahat
125	Panorama Hill		Pahang	271	889	A popular place to view sunrise and sunset in Kuantan

== See also ==
- List of hill stations in Malaysia
- List of volcanoes in Malaysia
