= Endau River =

River in Johor and Pahang, Malaysia

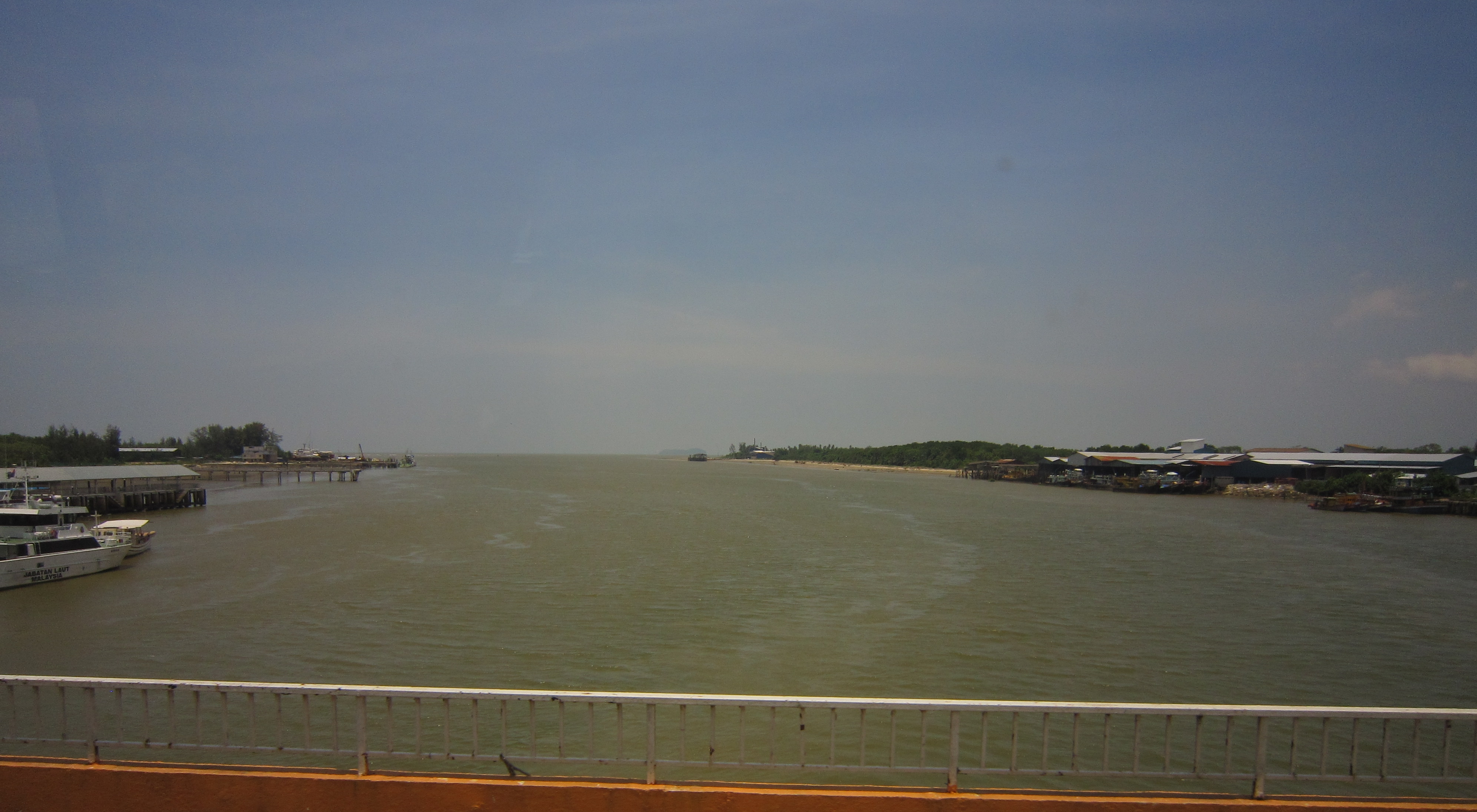
- The mouth of Endau River, at the border between Endau, Johor and Kuala Rompin, Pahang.
- Native name: Sungai Endau (Malay)

Location
- Country: Malaysia
- State: Johor

Physical characteristics
- Source: Gunung Besar, Tahan Range (Main Source)
  - location: Kuala Rompin, Pahang, merge with Sungai Kincin
  - coordinates: 2°46′N 103°13′E
  - elevation: 1036 m (3,432 ft)
- 2nd source
  - location: Near Bekok, Johor
  - coordinates: 2°30′N 103°11′E
- Mouth
  - location: South China Sea near Endau, Mersing District, Johor and Kuala Rompin, Rompin District, Pahang
  - coordinates: 2°40′N 103°38′E
  - elevation: 0 m (0 ft)

The Endau River (Malay: Sungai Endau) is a river that flows through the Malaysian state of Johor and empties into the South China Sea. The river is the namesake of the town of Endau, located at the south bank of the river, and Endau Rompin National Park, which is located to the northeast of Johor. The river itself, is the natural water border for state of Pahang and state of Johor.

== History ==
Endau on its own is a name of one person of Chitty or more known as India Peranakan who lives nearby the said town itself. Endau river first exploration came in 1881, which covers all of its sources and tributaries such as Sembrong and Madek. Sembrong especially run mostly on the south of the area reserved for the Endau Rompin National Park currently. This river is also stated as the pathway of Hang Tuah and his other four brothers sail through from Malacca to Pahang, an additional path apart from the famous Penarikan route.

== Course ==
Sources of Endau river came from two paths (One on the north and one on the east). Main sources of Endau River came from Tahan Range, specifically pointed on the highest peak which is Gunung Besar on the north. Up on the north, The river starts near Kuala Rompin, Pahang which connected mostly with Kincin River (Sungai Kincin). This area giving the first entrance of Taman Negara, The Peta Entrance which originated from one of the Orang Asli (The First People) settlement Kampong Peta. Meanwhile, on the east, Endau River starts nearby Bekok, Segamat which is the location for another entrance, The Selai Entrance. This entrance is not common due to its track condition that needs four wheel drive (4WD) vehicles to track down although majority of the national park area such as Gunung Tiong which provides tonnes of biodiversity mainly accessed from Selai Entrance.

=== Basin Extent ===
From source to its mouth onto South China Sea, The Endau River covers few more basins, tributaries and small rivers such as Kuala Sembrong, Ulu Kemapan, Kuala Kincin and Sungai Bantang which encompasses from Segamat, Labis and Endau in Johor, Kuala Rompin in Pahang.

== Bridge ==
Endau Bridge which was built in 1974 with 397.32 metres in length is the main connection from Kuala Rompin in Pahang towards Endau in Johor.

== See also ==
- Geography of Malaysia
- List of rivers of Malaysia
- Endau Rompin National Park
