= Mount Setong =

Mountain in Kuala Krai, Kelantan, Malaysia

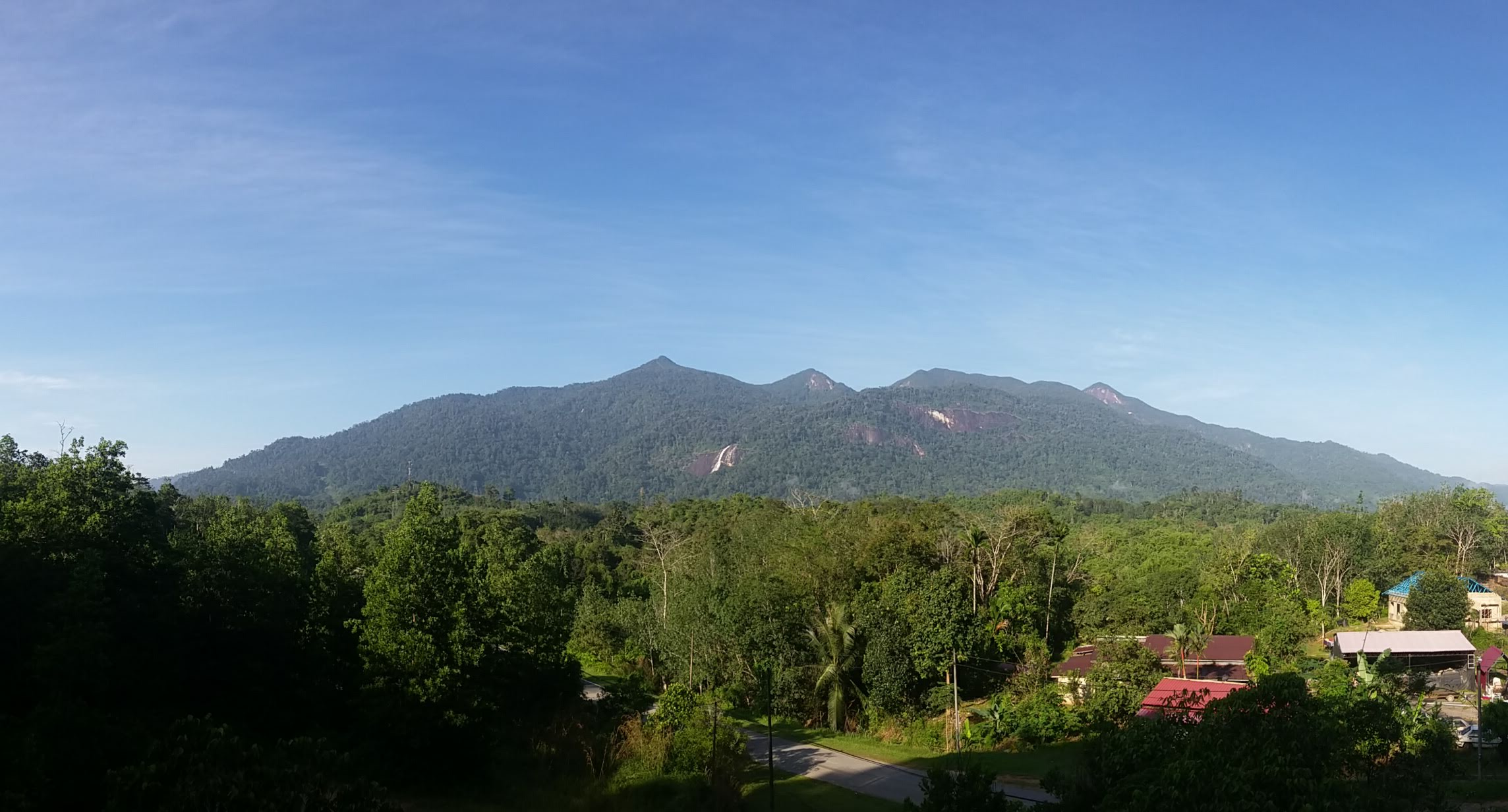
- Setong massif. Peaks from left to right: Ayam, Baha and Setong.

Highest point
- Elevation: 1,422 m (4,665 ft)
- Coordinates: 05°20′11″N 101°56′16″E

Naming
- Native name: Gunung Setong (Malay)

Geography
- Location within Kelantan Location within Malaysia
- Location: Kuala Krai District, Kelantan
- Parent range: Titiwangsa Mountains

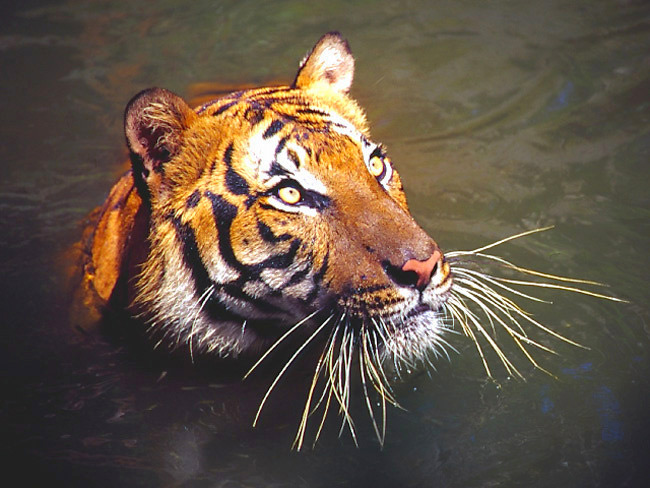
Malayan tiger

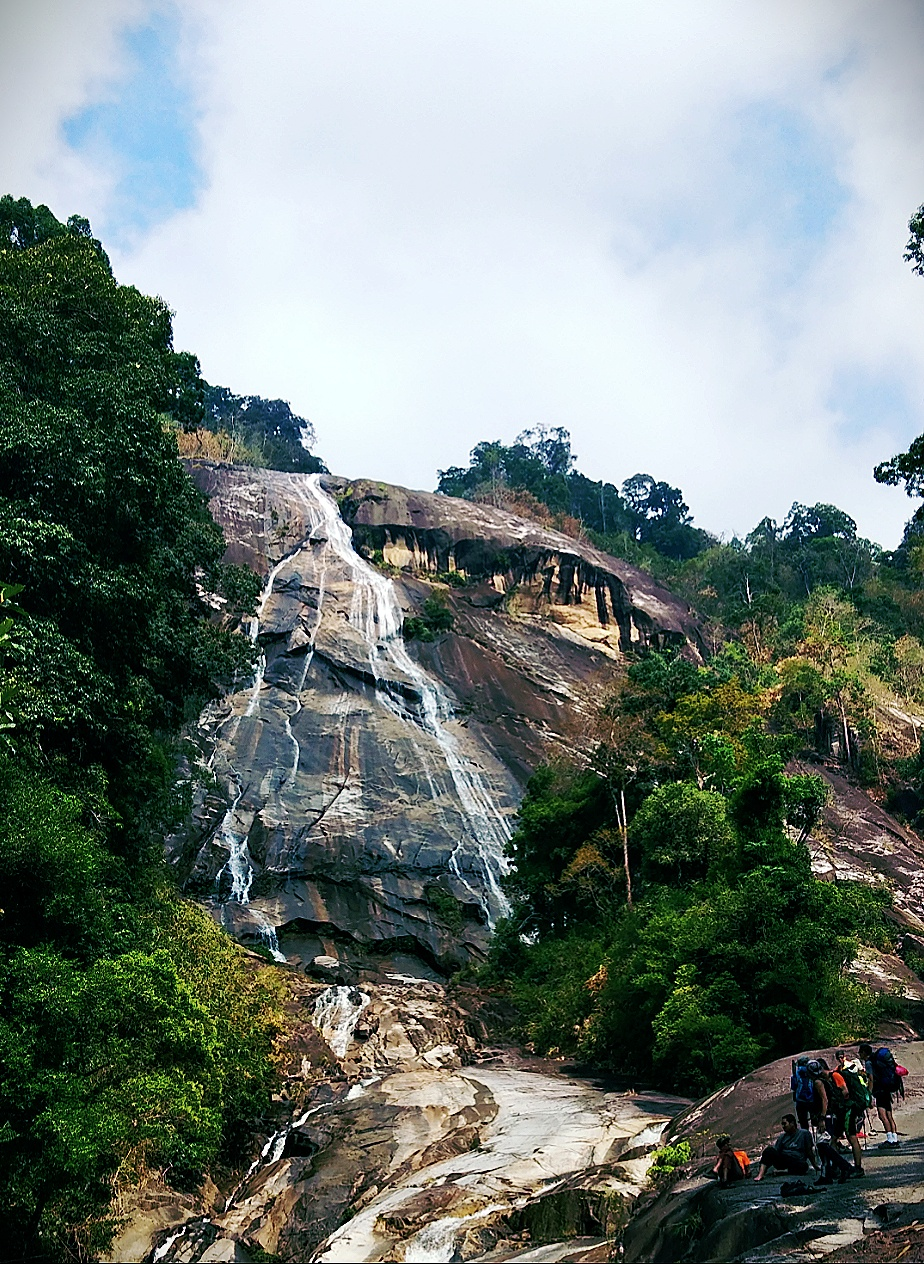
Jelawang Falls, Mount Stong

Mount Setong or Mount Stong (Malay: Gunung Setong or Gunung Stong) is a mountain located in Dabong, southern Kuala Krai District, Kelantan, Malaysia. It is situated approximately 300 km (186 mi) from Kota Bharu, the state capital. While it stands within Kuala Krai, it is also relatively closer to Gua Musang district.

The 1,422-metre-high mountain is a popular location for mountain climbers for its rough and challenging treks.

== Geography and ecology ==
Mount Setong is located within a massif in the northern part of the Titiwangsa Mountains. It is surrounded by several other peaks, namely Mts. Basor, Ayam, Baha, Anak Noring and Chamah. The area around Mount Setong, including Gunung Setong State Park, provides a vital habitat for Malayan tigers, a protected endangered subspecies of tiger in the country.

=== Forest profile ===
The mountain features hill dipterocarp, upper dipterocarp and montane forests, as the elevation gradually increases. There is an abundance of flora containing beneficial and medicinal properties that can be obtained within these forests.

== Special features ==
The mountain and its vicinities are part of the larger Gunung Stong State Park and Geopark, which is nationally hailed as a famed ecotourism within Kelantan. In addition, within the park's grounds are the 303-metre-high Jelawang Falls, which boast one of the highest waterfall drops in Southeast Asia.

== See also ==
- List of mountains in Malaysia
