= Dragon Horns =

Twin-peaked mountain on Tioman Island, Malaysia

Mount Semukut
- Dragon Horns
- Location within Malaysia

Highest point
- Elevation: 703 m (2,306 ft)
- Coordinates: 2.7695°N 104.1703°E

Naming
- Native name: Gunung Semukut (Malay)

Geography
- Location: Pulau Tioman, Pahang, Malaysia

Climbing
- First ascent: 2000, Waking Dream route

Mount Semukut (also known as the Dragon Horns) is a pair of steep granite towers on the southern tip of Tioman Island in Pahang, Malaysia. The twin monoliths rise to about 700 metres (2,297 ft) above sea level above the fishing village of Mukut, and are widely regarded as one of Pulau Tioman's most striking natural landmarks. The formation is referred to locally by the Malay names Gunung Nenek Semukut and Gunung Batu Simau.

== Geography ==
Mount Semukut stands immediately inland from the south coast of Tioman Island, above Semukut Bay and the village of Mukut. The twin peaks form a prominent skyline feature visible from much of the island's southern shoreline. Tioman itself lies in the South China Sea, off the east coast of Peninsular Malaysia, and is administered as part of Rompin District in the state of Pahang.

Access to the base of the Dragon Horns is typically via boat to Mukut, followed by a steep jungle path leading up from the village to the foot of the cliffs.

== Geology ==
The Dragon Horns are composed of mostly hard, coarse-grained granite, similar to the intrusive rocks that form much of Tioman Island and neighboring islets in the region. The towers rise steeply from lowland tropical rainforest, with near-vertical and overhanging faces that host crack systems, slabs and corner lines described in climbers’ reports. Their isolated position above the forest canopy and proximity to the sea contribute to the dramatic appearance of the formation.

== Climbing ==
Mount Semukut is regarded as one of Malaysia's notable trad and aid climbing locations. The first recorded ascent of the main tower was made in August 2000 by Scotty Nelson and Nick Tomlin, who established the route Waking Dream (Grade V, 5.9 A2) on the south face of Gunung Nenek Semukut.

== See also ==
- Tioman Island
- List of mountains in Malaysia
