= List of hill stations in Malaysia =

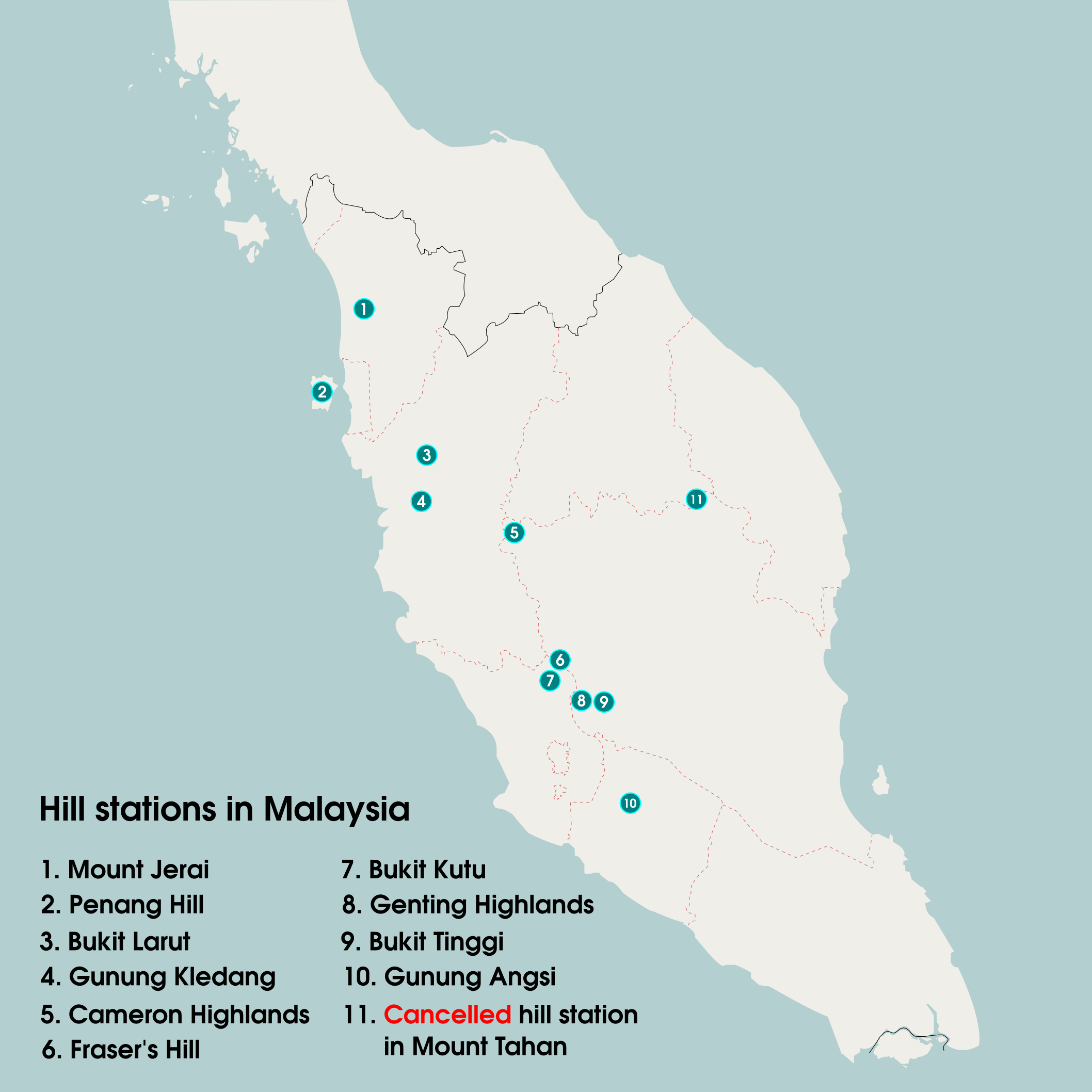
Map of hill stations in Malaysia

Ten hill stations have been built in Malaysia's mountainous areas. Four are in the state of Pahang, two are in Perak, and one each are in Kedah, Negeri Sembilan, Penang, and Selangor. Cameron Highlands is the largest hill station, covering 71,220 hectares (175,988 acres) of land, as well as the highest, at an elevation of 1,830 metres (6,004 ft) above sea level.

The concept of a hill station in the Malay Peninsula began during the colonial period of British Malaya. The British were not used to the environment, especially the hot tropical weather, endemic illnesses, and mosquito breeding areas. As a result, they began looking for alternative ways to allow British people to stay in tropical countries for a longer durations, as the travel distance and the British government's leave policy prevented any people who had settled in tropical countries from returning to Britain on a regular basis. Due to Malaya's geographical factors and abundant natural beauty, the British government built hill stations in the country. The first hill station, Penang Hill, was founded in 1787 on Penang Island. It was soon followed by Bukit Larut (1884) and Mount Kledang (1892) in Perak, Treacher Hill (1893) in Selangor, Mount Angsi (early 1900s) in Negeri Sembilan, and Fraser's Hill (1919) and Cameron Highlands (1925) in Pahang. Plans were initially made to build another hill station, on Mount Tahan, but it was never built due to the northern part of Mount Tahan being in Kelantan and not under British control. It would have been the highest hill station in the country, at an elevation of 2,187 m (7,175 ft) above sea level.

Following the independence of the Federation of Malaya in 1957 and the formation of Malaysia in 1963, another three hill stations were built: Genting Highlands (1971) in Pahang, Mount Jerai (1986) in Kedah, and Bukit Tinggi (1994) in Pahang. Unlike the previous colonial hill stations, they were established by the local people rather than by the British. Genting Highlands was inspired by founder Lim Goh Tong's business trip in the Cameron Highlands, where the fresh and cold climate of the hill station inspired him to build an entertainment center atop the hill. It includes hotels, amusement parks, cable cars, a golf course, the only operating casino in Malaysia, and the upcoming Genting SkyWorlds, which contains attractions with licensing agreements from 20th Century Studios and the Walt Disney Company. However, recent development at hill stations, including the renovation and uplifting of those built by the colonial government, have brought concerns over potential environmental consequences, including deforestation, water pollution, and visual pollution.

== List ==
According to Samuel Robert Aiken, professor of geography at Concordia University, the hill stations built before Malayan independence in 1957 can be divided into two categories: principal hill stations and minor hill stations. Principal hill stations are those that were developed in locations that were more integrated with social and cultural interactions, whereas minor hill stations are those that were less developed due to limited growth and low elevation, where the hill station was not located high enough to satisfy needs for a place with a sufficiently cool climate, and a lack of flat land to accommodate more government officials. Other hill stations that were not categorized by Aiken include Genting Highlands, Mount Jerai and Bukit Tinggi. These hill stations were developed after the independence, but received significant coverage from organizations including the University of California, Berkeley, the New Straits Times, and the World Wide Fund for Nature for strong economic and tourism development, or for potential risks to the environment due to recent development.

†	Principal hill station
‡	Minor hill station

Hill station name	State	Year established	Size	Elevation	Coordinates	Image	Ref
Bukit Kutu^{‡} (Treacher Hill)	Selangor	1893	Unknown	1,053 m (3,455 ft)	3°32′34.4″N 101°43′12.6″E	Bukit Kutu	
Bukit Larut^{†} (Note: Originally established as Maxwell Hill. The place was renamed to Bukit Larut in 1979.)	Perak	1884	690 ha (1,705 acres)	1,250 m (4,101 ft)	4°51′44.28″N 100°47′34.8″E	Mist at Bukit Larut	
Bukit Tinggi	Pahang	1994	2,000 ha (4,942 acres)	820 m (2,690 ft)	3°24′0.70″N 101°50′23.7″E	Inside the Colmar Tropicale	
Cameron Highlands^{†}	Pahang	1925	71,220 ha (175,988 acres)	1,830 m (6,004 ft)	4°29′11.6″N 101°22′46.8″E	Cameron Highlands tea plantation	
Fraser's Hill^{†}	Pahang	1919 (Note: Fraser’s Hill was originally founded in 1890 as a tin mining community known as Pamah Lebar and was renamed as Fraser’s Hill in 1922 after the conversion from former tin mining area into a hill station.)	2,829 ha (6,991 acres)	1,456 m (4,777 ft)	3°42′50.4″N 101°44′6″E	Fraser's Hill clock tower	
Genting Highlands	Pahang	1971	3,965 ha (9,798 acres)	1,828 m (5,997 ft)	3°25′15.1″N 101°47′35.4″E	Genting Highlands	
Mount Angsi^{‡}	Negeri Sembilan	early 1900s	Unknown	825 m (2,707 ft)	2°41′55.4″N 102°02′52.7″E	Mount Angsi entrance gate	
Mount Jerai	Kedah	1986	8,560 ha (21,152 acres)	1,217 m (3,993 ft)	5°47′16.9″N 100°26′03.2″E	Mount Jerai	
Mount Kledang^{‡}	Perak	1892	Unknown	808 m (2,651 ft)	4°35′38.3″N 101°00′53.3″E	Mount Kledang view from Ipoh	
Penang Hill^{†}	Penang	1787	468 ha (1,156 acres)	833 m (2,733 ft)	5°25′26.3″N 100°16′08.3″E	Penang Hill	

== Bibliography ==
- Aiken, S. Robert (October 1987). "Early Penang Hill Station". Geographical Review. 77 (4). Oxfordshire: Taylor & Francis Ltd: 421–439. Bibcode:1987GeoRv..77..421A. doi:10.2307/214282. JSTOR 214282.
- Cheong, Carell (2013). Fraser's Hill – A Lush Highland Hideaway (PDF). Petaling Jaya: World Wide Fund for Nature. ISBN 9789670237268. Archived from the original (PDF) on 2020-07-13.
- WWF Malaysia (November 2001). Study on the Development of Hill Stations: Final Report Volume 1 (PDF). Petaling Jaya: World Wide Fund for Nature.
