= Endau settlement =

The Endau settlement, also known as the New Syonan Model Farm, or simply New Syonan, was a settlement in Endau, Malaysia created by the Japanese during the Japanese Occupation of Singapore in an attempt alleviate the issue of food shortages in Singapore by relocating citizens elsewhere.

== History ==
Due to the Japanese Occupation of Singapore, foreign trade was disrupted, thus causing food shortages, as Singapore had been primarily relying on imports for food supply. The Japanese introduced the Grow More Food Campaign to encourage locals to grow their own food, which was not enough. In August 1943, the Japanese begun a project to relocate Singaporeans out of Singapore to other areas. Headed by Mamoru Shinozaki, the first step of the project was to relocate Chinese citizens to a new settlement in Endau, Johor. Shinozaki convinced the Oversea Chinese Association to help with the construct the settlement, stating that the Japanese would not interfere with the settlement, and the rice supply would be provided until the settlement attained self-sufficiency. The Association provided $2,000,000 for the construction of the farms, and a New Syonan Model Farm Construction Committee was formed under the chairmanship of Peranakan physician Lim Boon Keng. Following this, the jungle around the area of the planned settlement was cleared for development. Roads and houses were built to serve the settlers.

As the Japanese promised that they would not interfere with the settlement, many Chinese in Singapore were interested in moving to Endau, despite the tougher living conditions. The first settlers arrived in September 1943, and although they had been provided with basic farming tools to begin farming, many lacked the experience necessary for farming or construction. This prompted the Overseas Chinese Association to set up a management committee for the settlement, with Robert Tan Hoon Siang, the son of rubber tycoon Tan Chay Yan, being appointed as the head of the agricultural department, Chen Kee Sun being appointed as manager, Dr. Hu Tsai Kuen and Dr. Chen Ah Po being put in charge of the medical and health department, Woo Mon Chew being put in charge of the public works department, Leong Yuen Ho being put in charge of the timber mill, and Wong Tatt Sang being put in charge of peace and order. Wong was later replaced by Lo Po Yee and Goh Hood Kiat. By the end of the settlement's first year, the population had grown to about 12,000, and featured several amenities, such as a school, a bank, restaurants and a hospital. The settlement also had a sawmill, a paper factory, and a cigarette factory.

However, Chinese anti-Japanese guerillas attacked the settlement, killing several civilians and officials, until Shinozaki negotiated with the guerillas, offering rice in exchange for peace in the area. Following the end of the occupation of Singapore, the settlement was abandoned, with the settlers returning to Singapore.
