= Betung Kerihun National Park =

National park in Indonesia

- IUCN category II (national park)
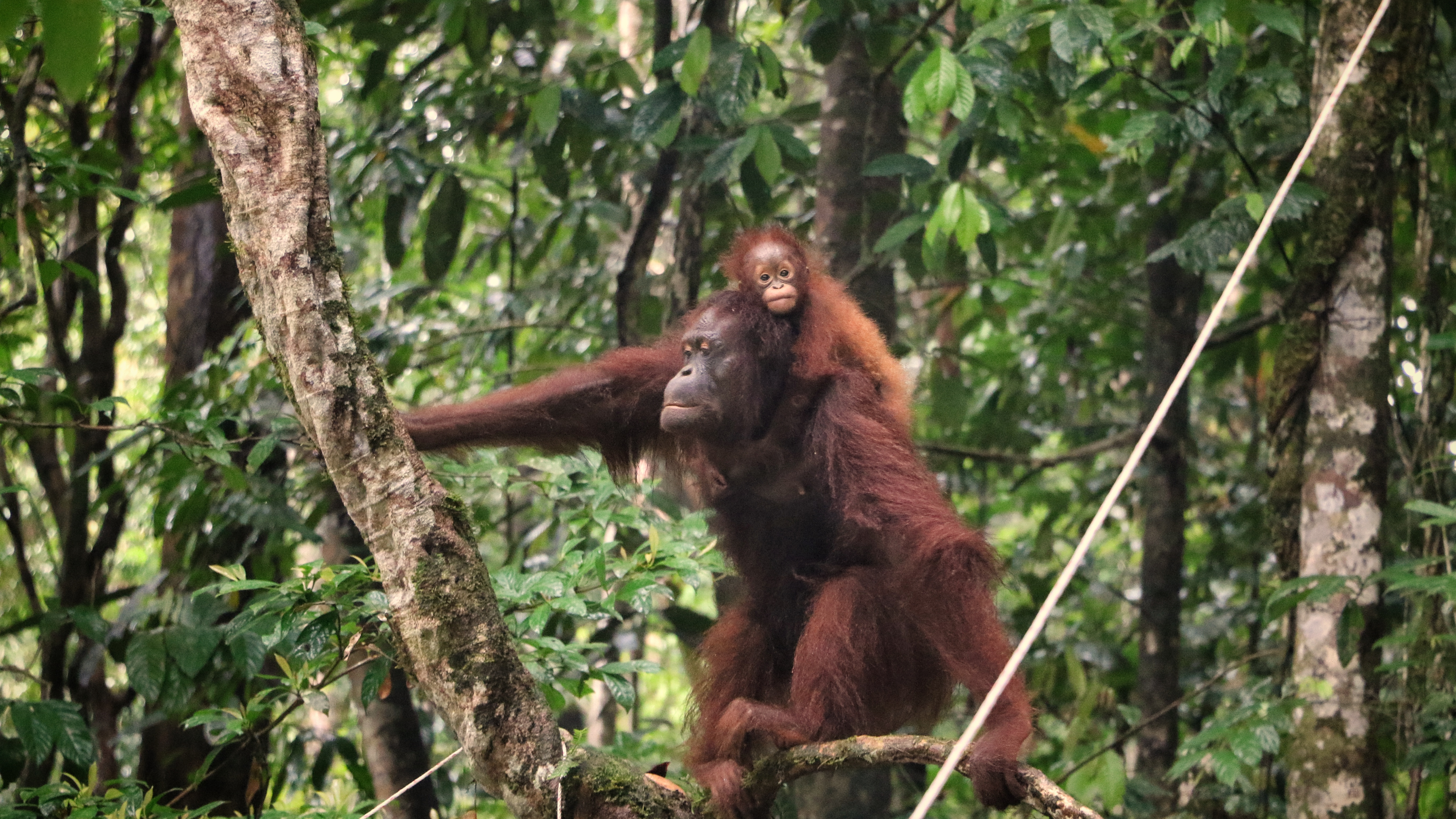
- Endangered Bornean orangutan inhabits the park

- Location within Borneo
- Location: Indonesia (West Kalimantan)
- Coordinates: 1°13′15″N 113°21′11″E
- Area: 8,000 km^{2} (3,100 sq mi)
- Established: 1995
- Governing body: Ministry of Forestry

Betung Kerihun National Park (Indonesian: Taman Nasional Betung Kerihun) (Note: formerly known as Bentuang Karimun National Park (Indonesian: Taman Nasional Bentuang Karimun)) is a national park located in the Indonesian province of West Kalimantan, on the island of Borneo. The park was established in 1995, and has a total area of 8,000 km^{2} (3,100 sq mi) or about 5.5 percent of West Kalimantan Province area. Together with the 2,000 km^{2} (800 sq mi) Lanjak Entimau Wildlife Sanctuary in Malaysia, it has been proposed to form a World Heritage Site named the "Transborder Rainforest Heritage of Borneo".

== Topography and ecology ==
Betung Kerihun National Park is hilly and mountainous, with altitudes ranging from 150 m (490 ft) to almost 1,800 m (5,910 ft). The topography is characterized by steep slopes, with more than half of the park area having slopes over 45%. The highest peaks are Mount Kerihun (1,790 m or 5,870 ft) and Mount Lawit (1,767 m or 5,800 ft). The park is located at the headwaters of the Kapuas River.

The park largely consists of two ecoregions, Borneo montane rain forests, which covers about 2/3 of the area, and Borneo lowland rain forests.

== Flora and fauna ==
In the lowland forests the dominant emergent trees are dipterocarp species, which are replaced at higher elevations with oaks (Quercus) species of Lithocarpus and Castanopsis. At least 97 species of orchid and 49 species of palm have been identified in the Park.

The fauna of the park is rich, with 300 species of bird (25 endemic to Borneo), at least 162 fish species and at least 54 mammals. The park is home to endangered Bornean orangutan and seven other primate species: Müller's Bornean gibbon, white-fronted surili, maroon leaf monkey, southern pig-tailed macaque, crab-eating macaque, Sunda slow loris and Horsfield's tarsier.

== Human habitation ==
Several Dayak tribes, including Dayak Iban, Dayak Taman, and Dayak Bukat live in the park. There are 12 villages in and around the park, 2 of which are located inside the park (Nanga Bungan and Tanjung Lokang) and 6 are adjacent to the park boundary. They live from hunting, collecting non-timber forest products and subsistence farming based on a pattern of shifting cultivation.

== Conservation and threats ==
Betung Kerihun National Park was first established as a 600,000 ha nature reserve in 1982 by a Ministry of Agriculture decree. The size was enlarged to 800,000 ha in 1992 and the conservation status was changed to national park in 1995. The Betung Kerihun Park Management Unit was formally launched by the Minister of Forestry in 1997. Currently, it has 57 full-time staff and 20 honorary members. Among these, 24 park rangers are responsible for supervising each of the four field posts in the 800,000ha area.

Significant threats towards the integrity of Betung Kerihun are deforestation by illegal logging and wildlife poaching. WWF data collected in 2002 found that about 31,000 trees were illegally logged in the Park. Reports suggest poaching of the most endangered primate orangutan is reaching alarming levels. About 10-15 orangutans were traded every month from West and Central Kalimantan forests to supply markets in Indonesia's large cities, including Jakarta and Denpasar.

== See also ==
- Geography of Indonesia
