= Endau =

Town in Mersing, Johor, Malaysia

Coordinates: 2°39′N 103°37′E

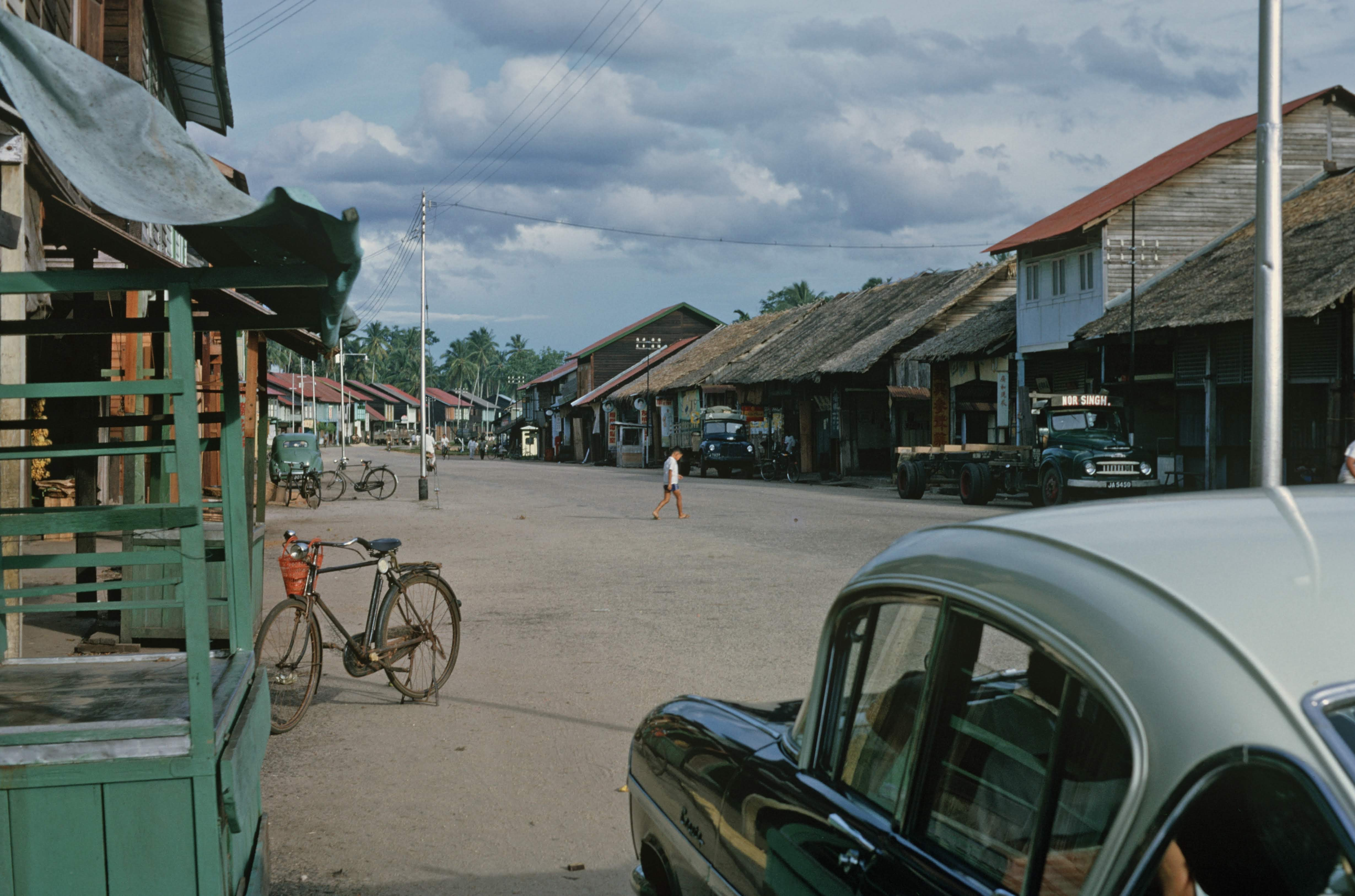
Street in Endau in 1964

Endau is a small town in Mersing District, Johor, Malaysia. It lies on the northern tip of east Johor, on the border with the Pahang state.

== Name ==
The town was named Endau after a Peranakan Indian who resided in the area. In the 19th century it was known to the British as Blair's Harbour.

== History ==
The town was opened by Dato' Mohd Ali by an order from Temenggong Ibrahim. The town expanded due to its location as the center of economy for the people who worked in the trading, fishing and logging sectors at that time.

During World War 2, the Japanese created a small settlement of Chinese from Singapore called the Endau settlement, to alleviate food shortages. It was abandoned after the Japanese surrender.

== Economy ==
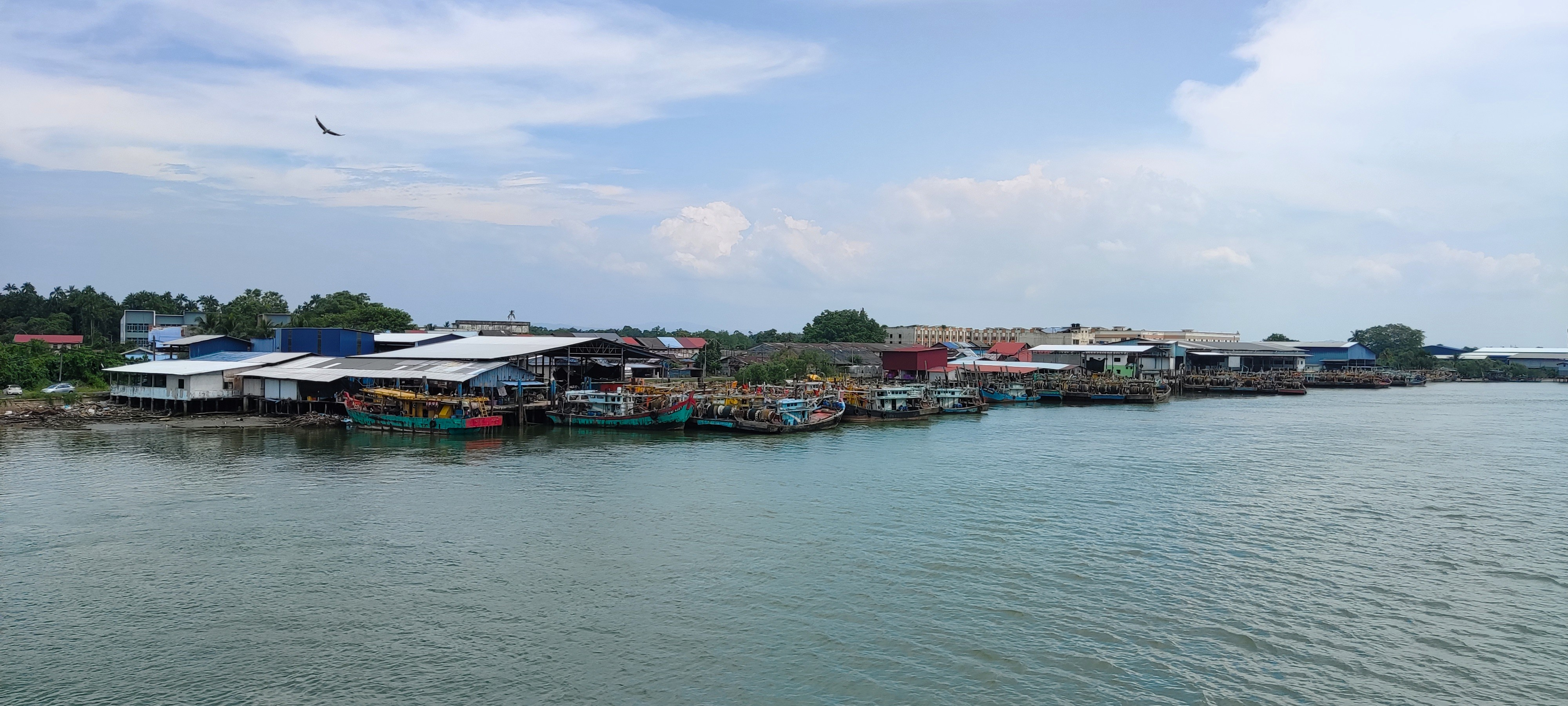
The view of fishing port from Endau Bridge

The town is one of the largest fishing ports on the East Coast of Peninsular Malaysia.

== Education ==
=== Primary school ===
1. Sekolah Kebangsaan Teriang
2. Sekolah Kebangsaan Telok Lipat
3. Sekolah Kebangsaan Tanjung Resang
4. Sekolah Kebangsaan Pusat Air Tawar
5. Sekolah Kebangsaan Penyabong
6. Sekolah Kebangsaan Lembaga Endau
7. Sekolah Kebangsaan Labung
8. Sekolah Kebangsaan Bandar Endau
9. Sekolah Jenis Kebangsaan (Cina) St Joseph (M)
10. Sekolah Jenis Kebangsaan (Cina) Kampung Hubong
11. Sekolah Jenis Kebangsaan (Cina) Chiao Ching

=== Secondary school ===
1. Sekolah Menengah Kebangsaan Ungku Husin

== Climate ==
Endau has a tropical rainforest climate (Af) with heavy to very heavy rainfall year-round and with extremely heavy rainfall in December.

Climate data for Endau
Month	Jan	Feb	Mar	Apr	May	Jun	Jul	Aug	Sep	Oct	Nov	Dec	Year
Mean daily maximum °C (°F)	28.9 (84.0)	29.8 (85.6)	31.0 (87.8)	32.2 (90.0)	32.4 (90.3)	31.9 (89.4)	31.4 (88.5)	31.3 (88.3)	31.3 (88.3)	31.3 (88.3)	30.2 (86.4)	28.9 (84.0)	30.9 (87.6)
Daily mean °C (°F)	25.7 (78.3)	26.3 (79.3)	26.8 (80.2)	27.4 (81.3)	27.6 (81.7)	27.2 (81.0)	26.7 (80.1)	26.7 (80.1)	26.6 (79.9)	26.7 (80.1)	26.2 (79.2)	25.7 (78.3)	26.6 (80.0)
Mean daily minimum °C (°F)	22.6 (72.7)	22.9 (73.2)	22.7 (72.9)	22.7 (72.9)	22.8 (73.0)	22.5 (72.5)	22.1 (71.8)	22.1 (71.8)	22.0 (71.6)	22.2 (72.0)	22.3 (72.1)	22.5 (72.5)	22.5 (72.4)
Average rainfall mm (inches)	456 (18.0)	260 (10.2)	220 (8.7)	149 (5.9)	149 (5.9)	142 (5.6)	160 (6.3)	143 (5.6)	180 (7.1)	213 (8.4)	411 (16.2)	695 (27.4)	3,178 (125.3)
Source: Climate-Data.org
