= Mount Meliau =

Mountain in Malaysia

Meliau Hill
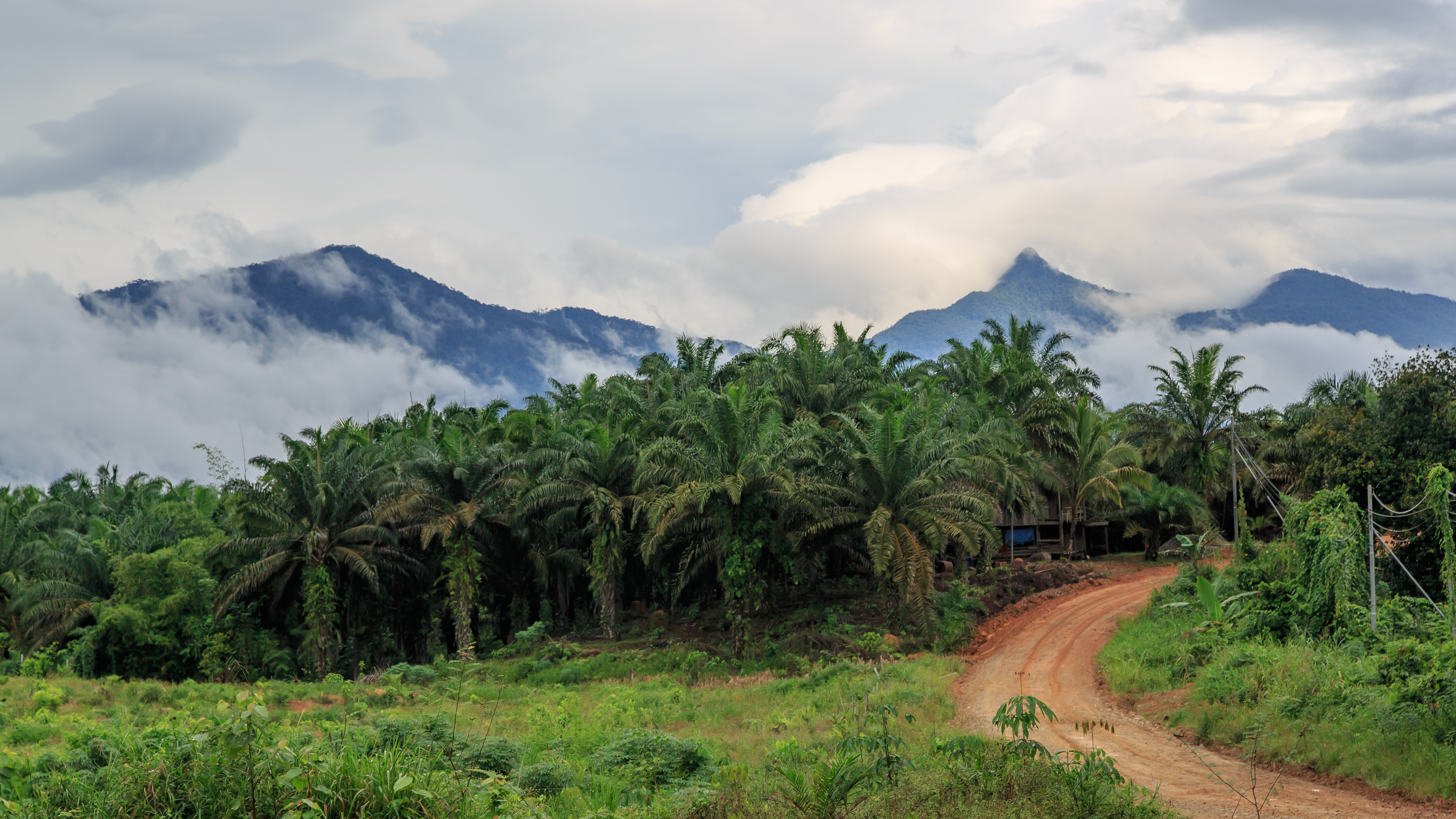
- Meliau Hill taken from Buis Kiabau Road, Telupid

Highest point
- Elevation: 1,321 m (4,334 ft)
- Prominence: 888 m (2,913 ft)
- Listing: Ribu
- Coordinates: 5°50′10″N 117°01′35″E

Geography
- Location within Malaysia
- Location: Telupid District, Sabah, Malaysia
- Parent range: Meliau Range

Meliau Hill (Malay: Bukit Meliau) is a mountain located on the north bank the Labuk River between Telupid and Pamol in the eastern part of Ulu Tungud Forest Reserve in Telupid District, Sandakan Division of Sabah, Malaysia. The summit is 1,321 m above sea level.
