= Mount Sinsing =

Mountain in Sabah, Malaysia

- Location within Malaysia

Highest point
- Elevation: 2,603 m (8,540 ft)
- Prominence: 705 m (2,313 ft)
- Listing: Spesial Ribu
- Coordinates: 5°38′32″N 116°31′38″E

Naming
- Native name: Gunung Sinsing (Malay)

Geography
- Location: West Coast Division, Sabah, Malaysia
- Parent range: Trusmadi Range

Mount Sinsing (Malay: Gunung Sinsing) is a mountain in the West Coast Division of Sabah, Malaysia. It is the country's 3rd-highest peak, at 2,603 metres (8,540 ft).
