= Endau Bridge =

Sungai Endau Bridge Jambatan Endau
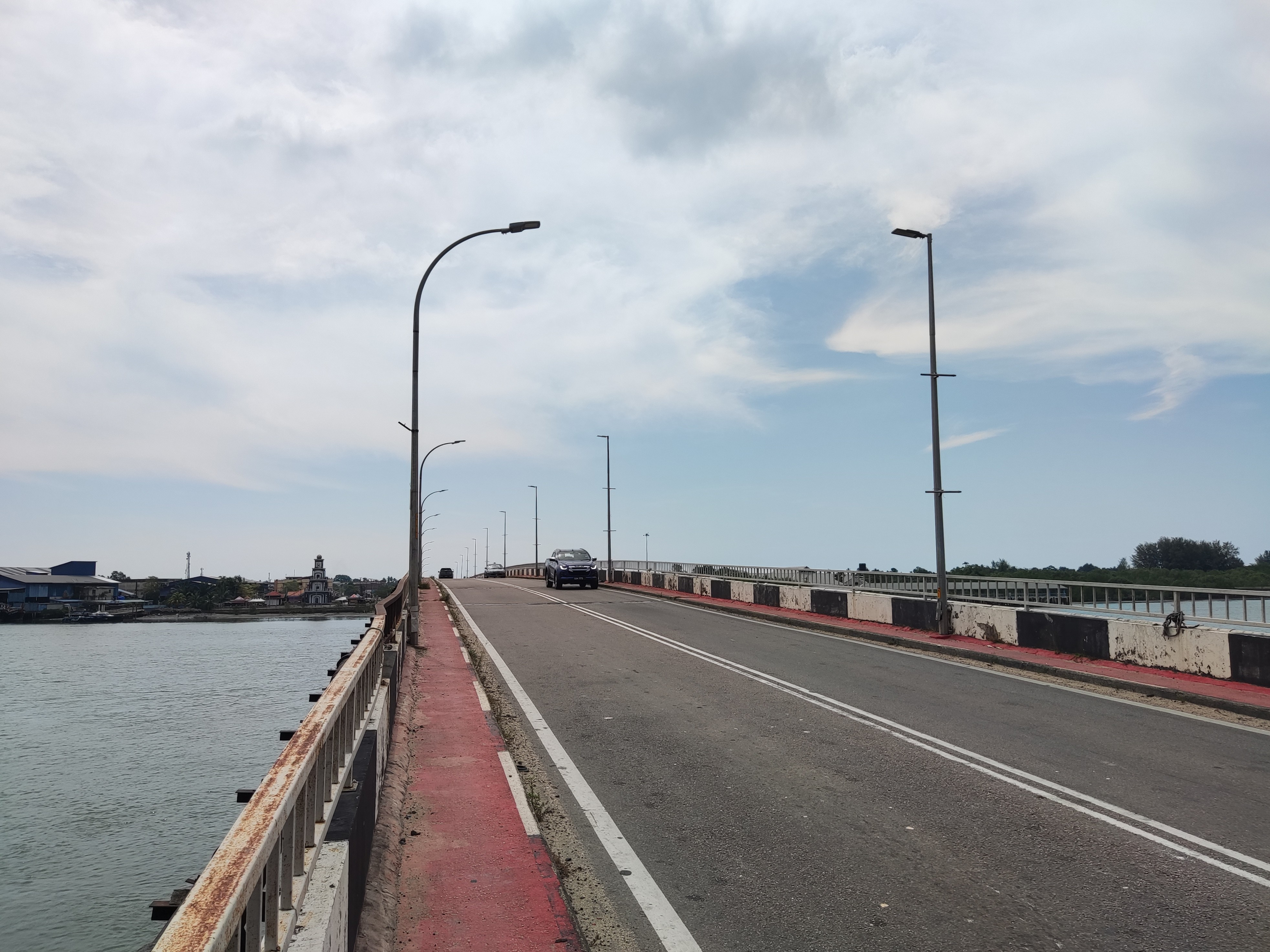
- Coordinates: 2°39′24″N 103°37′18″E
- Carries: Motor vehicles, Pedestrians
- Crosses: Endau River
- Locale: Federal Route 3 Jalan Pekan-Mersing
- Official name: Endau Bridge
- Maintained by: Malaysian Public Works Department (JKR) Rompin and Mersing; Roadcare Sdn Bhd (Pahang); Selia Selenggara Selatan Sdn Bhd (Johor)

Characteristics
- Design: box girder bridge
- Total length: --
- Width: --
- Longest span: --

History
- Designer: Malaysian Public Works Department (JKR)
- Constructed by: Malaysian Public Works Department (JKR)
- Opened: --

Location
- Interactive map of Sungai Endau Bridge

Endau Bridge (Malay: Jambatan Endau) is a main bridge in Pahang and Johor state, Malaysia. The bridge is located along Federal Route 3 and the confluence of Endau River, a river boundary of Pahang and Johor state. Among the activities is fishing population. Several jetties built along the river.
