= Bukit Kutu =

Ghost town in Malaysia

- Ghost town
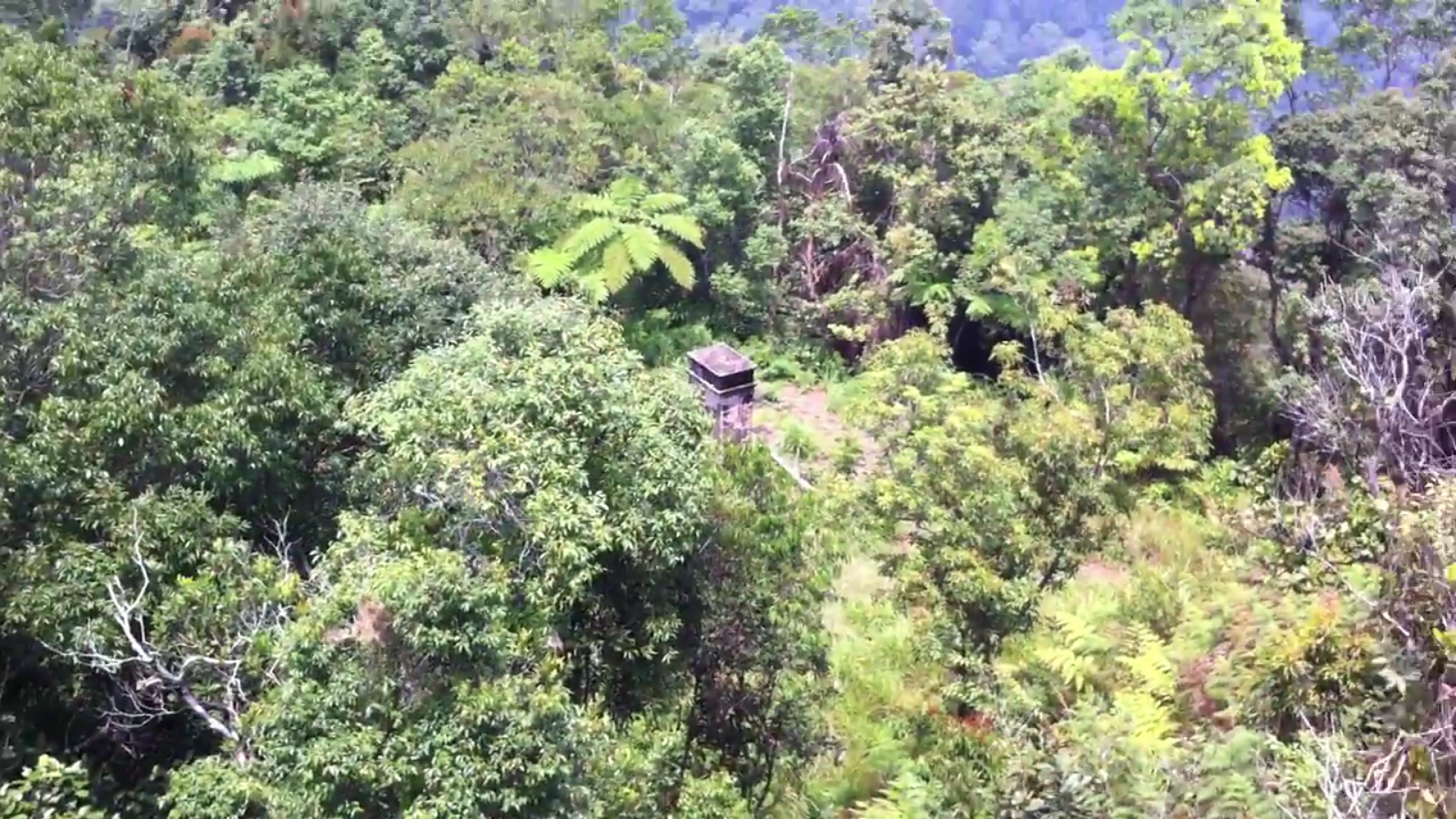
- Remains of Bukit Kutu
- Etymology: Treacher Hill: former British Resident of Selangor, William Hood Treacher; Bukit Kutu: Flea (in Malay language)
- Location within Malaysia Location within Selangor
- Coordinates: 3°32′34.4″N 101°43′12.6″E
- Country: Malaysia
- State: Selangor Darul Ehsan
- District: Hulu Selangor
- Established: 1893
- Gazetted as wildlife reserve: 1922

Government
  - Administration: Department of Wildlife and National Parks Peninsular Malaysia (PERHILITAN)

Area
  - Total: 1,943 ha (4,800 acres)
- Elevation: 1,053 m (3,455 ft)

Population (2020)
  - Total: 0
  - Density: 0.0/km^{2} (0.0/sq mi)
- Time zone: UTC+08:00 (MST)

Bukit Kutu or Treacher Hill is a former hill station and now a ghost town in Hulu Selangor District, Selangor, Malaysia. This hill station was established in 1893 and consisted of two bungalows, which served as a lodge for visitors and included a 15.3 km (9.5 mi) bridle path that connected it with the town of Kuala Kubu. The hill station was abandoned in 1935 and the government of British Malaya acquired the station's bungalows which were sold as they no longer paid their way. The Japanese army later bombed the station during World War II, leaving it a ghost town. Since the abandonment of the hill station, it has become a popular hiking destination and is busiest during weekends. Bukit Kutu has a rich biodiversity with various kinds of flora and fauna which led to its gazettement as a wildlife reserve in 1922.

== Etymology ==
Treacher Hill is named after a former British Resident of Selangor, William Hood Treacher, whereas the alternative Malayan name Bukit Kutu comes from the Orang Asli people who said the route was too long. Kutu in Malay language means flea, and Bukit means hill, literally "flea hill".

== History ==
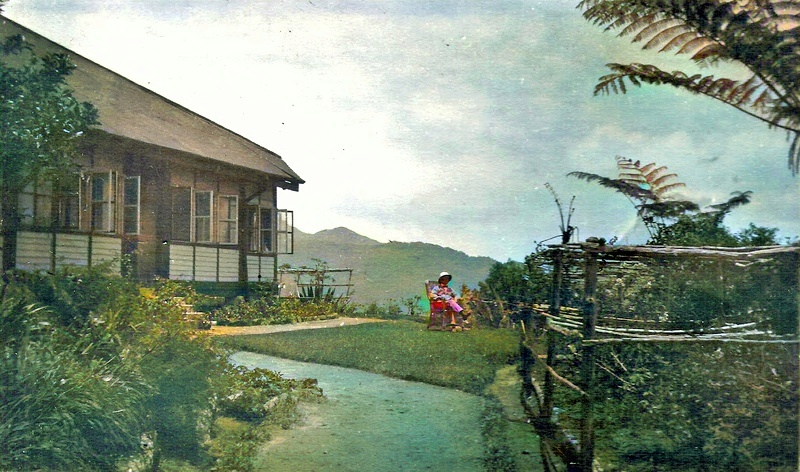
Bukit Kutu in 1921

The hill station was established in 1893 and housed only two bungalows. The first bungalow was constructed by the Selangor government in 1895, using granite and timber; the second bungalow was constructed in 1904. They served as a lodge for visitors renting for a $1 per day for visitors and available free of charge for government officers. Occupying them required a permit from the Kuala Kubu District Officer. Each bungalow provided bedrooms, a landline telephone, a fireplace, a tennis court and a telescope. The hill station was connected by a 15.3 km (9.5 mi) bridle path, which served as the only road connecting Kuala Kubu with Bukit Kutu. The Straits Times described the road's quality as "extremely bad" and felt it was a "pity" that a better road had not been constructed considering the hill station was a favorite tourist destination.

By 1935, the abandoned bungalows in Bukit Kutu were in ruins and the place had become a ghost town. Both buildings were sold to the government of British Malaya as they no longer paid their way. The Japanese army bombed the hill station during World War II. With the abandonment of the town, the only road access to the hill station became overgrown with thick vegetation, leaving it hidden from public view. As of 2020, the only remains of this ghost town are a chimney, a fireplace and a well. The chimney was part of the bungalow previously owned by Tom Sargent, a construction engineer for Federated Malay States Railway.

The trail to the ghost town has become a popular route with hikers, with peak use occurring on weekends. As there will be risks of getting lost inside the trail, all hikers are required to register with police and obtain a permit to access the trail that leads to the hill station. There has been several safety related incidents that have been reported since it became a popular hiking trail. A teacher from Taman Keramat went missing inside the trail in November 2015. While police has been attempted to search for the missing person, as of 2019, her remains has yet to be found. One hiker was rescued after they collapsed from a muscle cramp in November 2016. In July 2017, a hiker from Egypt was reportedly missing on Bukit Kutu, only to be rediscovered after 16 hours.

== Geography ==
Bukit Kutu is a mountainous terrain. The altitude at its highest point is 1,053 metres (3,455 ft) above sea level. The terrain is described as steep. It is one of the four areas that serve as the water catchment area for the Sungai Selangor River. The other three are Hulu Selangor, Semangkok and Fraser's Hill. Aside from forests which cover the water catchment areas, the other natural features in Bukit Kutu include the Lata Medang waterfall, and a large stone called Batu Tebung, which was reportedly defaced by irresponsible people who visited the site. Samuel Robert Aiken, a geography professor at Concordia University, classified the hill station as minor because of the lack of flat land that hindered additional development. The main environmental issue created by visitors is littering with rubbish left behind in the area.

=== Climate ===
Bukit Kutu climate is classified as tropical. The temperature there averages 26.5 °C (79.7 °F). The average yearly rainfall is 3,320 millimetres (130.8 in). Precipitation is the lowest in June, with an average of 230 millimetres (9 in). The most precipitation falls in November—an average of 460 mm (18 in). With an average temperature of 27.2 °C (81.0 °F), May is the hottest month of the year. December has the lowest average temperature of the year—26.0 °C (78.8 °F). Between the driest and wettest months, the difference in precipitation is 230 millimetres (9 in).

Climate data for Bukit Kutu
Month	Jan	Feb	Mar	Apr	May	Jun	Jul	Aug	Sep	Oct	Nov	Dec	Year
Daily mean °C (°F)	26.1 (79.0)	26.5 (79.7)	26.8 (80.2)	27.0 (80.6)	27.2 (81.0)	27.0 (80.6)	26.6 (79.9)	26.6 (79.9)	26.4 (79.5)	26.3 (79.3)	26.1 (79.0)	26.0 (78.8)	26.6 (79.8)
Average precipitation cm (inches)	25 (10)	28 (11)	36 (14)	41 (16)	33 (13)	23 (9)	25 (10)	28 (11)	33 (13)	43 (17)	46 (18)	38 (15)	399 (157)
Source: Norwegian Meteorological Institute

=== Biodiversity ===
According to The Straits Times, Bukit Kutu is rich in biodiversity with its forests of trees, moss, fungus, flowers, orchards, ferns, pitcher plants, vines, monkeys, bamboo, ants, centipedes, lizards, squirrels, butterflies, birds and hornbills. The author also noted that the twigs in the forest resembled reptiles or insects. This rich biodiversity has attracted biologists and researchers to study the species found in the area. For instance, seven subspecies of mosquitoes were discovered and studied by Kuala Lumpur Institute for Medical Research researchers between 1907 and 1908. In addition, a new mosquito species was discovered in 1903 by biologist Dr. Daniels which closely resembles anopheles of Italy, another malaria-carrying mosquito. The species was named A. Treacheri. Three subspecies of dobsonfly genus Neurhermes Navás were discovered and studied in 2014 by researchers from the China Agricultural University and the Tokyo Metropolitan University. Haematopota albiocrea and Haematopota splendens, new haematopota subspecies, were discovered in 1931. The abundant, rich biodiversity in this region has been gazetted as Malaysian wildlife reserves by the Department of Wildlife and National Parks Peninsular Malaysia (PERHILITAN) in 1922, with an area of 1,943 ha (4,800 acres).
