= Mount Chamah =

Mountain in Kelantan, Malaysia

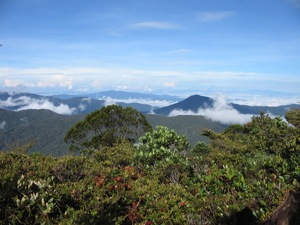
- Sunrise on the summit

Highest point
- Elevation: 2,172 m (7,126 ft)
- Prominence: 1,041 m (3,415 ft)
- Listing: Ribu
- Coordinates: 5°13′43.34″N 101°34′24.41″E

Naming
- Native name: Gunung Chamah (Malay)

Geography
- Location within Malaysia
- Location: Gua Musang District, Kelantan
- Parent range: Titiwangsa Mountains

Climbing
- Easiest route: Rekom Trail (east)

Mount Chamah is a mountain in northwestern Gua Musang District in the Malaysian state of Kelantan, close to the border with Perak. Nestled within the northern section of the Titiwangsa Mountains, it is the second highest point in the state of Kelantan and the fifth highest mountain in the Malay Peninsula at 2,172 m (7,126 ft) above sea level.

== History ==
During the period of the Communist Insurgency, this area was out of bounds for ordinary citizens. However, after the peace agreement between the Malaysian government and the communists that was signed in Hat Yai in the 1980s, the authorities began to relax their rules on jungle trekking in the Titiwangsa Range.

== Hiking ==
Mount Chamah, being one of the G7 mountains, is considered by experts to be a challenging mountain to climb due to its limited access points. The area is mostly uncharted and hosts a population of Malayan tigers. Care should be taken when attempting any ascent, due to these factors.

== See also ==
- List of mountains in Malaysia
