= Mount Lawit =

Mountain on the Indonesia–Malaysia border

- Location within Malaysia

Highest point
- Elevation: 1,767 m (5,797 ft)
- Prominence: 1,128 m (3,701 ft)
- Listing: Ribu
- Coordinates: 1°24′N 112°58′E

Geography
- Location: Indonesia – Malaysia border

Mount Lawit (Gunung Lawit) is a mountain on the island of Borneo. It is 1,767 m (5,797 ft) high and sits on the international border between Indonesia and Malaysia. On the Indonesian side of the border, the mountain is within the Betung Kerihun National Park.
