= Mount Kaingaran =

Mountain in Sabah, Malaysia

- Location within Malaysia

Highest point
- Elevation: 2,468 m (8,097 ft)
- Prominence: 546 m (1,791 ft)
- Coordinates: 6°12′31″N 116°39′29″E

Naming
- Native name: Gunung Kaingaran (Malay); Nulu Kaingaran (Kadazan Dusun)

Geography
- Location: Tambunan, Interior Division, Sabah, Malaysia
- Parent range: Trusmadi Range

Mount Kaingaran (Malay: Gunung Kaingaran, Dusun: Nulu Kaingaran) is a mountain located at the Interior Division of Sabah, Malaysia. It is considered as the new 3rd highest peak record found in the country with height at 2,468 metres (8,097 ft).
