= Mount Tahan =

Mountain in Pahang, Malaysia

- Location within Malaysia

Highest point
- Elevation: 2,187 m (7,175 ft)
- Prominence: 2,140 m (7,020 ft)
- Listing: Ultra; Ribu
- Coordinates: 4°37′57″N 102°14′03″E

Naming
- Native name: Gunung Tahan (Malay)

Geography
- Location: Taman Negara; Jerantut District, Pahang; Gua Musang District, Kelantan
- Parent range: Tahan Range

Mount Tahan (Malay: Gunung Tahan), is the highest point in Peninsular Malaysia with an elevation of 2,187 m (7,175 ft) above sea level, on the border between the states of Pahang and Kelantan, with the peak lying on the Pahangite side. It is part of the Taman Negara that straddles Jerantut District in Pahang, Gua Musang District in Kelantan and Hulu Terengganu District in Terengganu. The mountain is part of the Tahan Range in the Tenasserim Hills and is popular with local climbers.

Gunung Tahan is considered by many to be one of the toughest treks in Peninsular Malaysia.

== Names ==
The word tahan in Malay means "forbidden", there is a folktale of the mountain being guarded by two humongous apes because it has two magical wells which can give anyone powers of changing any other object into gold and silver.

It is also known by the name of Gunung Rotan ("rattan mountain") or Gunung Ulu Tanum ("source mountain of the Tanum River") in the west; the Kelantanese call it Gunung Siam ("Siam Mountain").

== Trails ==
There are three trails to the summit, commonly referred to as:

- Kuala Tahan-Kuala Tahan
- Merapoh-Kuala Tahan or Kuala Tahan-Merapoh
- Merapoh-Merapoh

The Kuala Tahan classic trail is the oldest and most scenic trail. A return trip on this trail typically takes seven days. Climbers have to trek across undulating ridges and make several river crossings before finally reaching the foot of the mountain to make the final ascent. Climbers without adequate physical fitness or training are not advised to attempt Gunung Tahan.

The other two trails are from Merapoh (Sungai Relau). The Merapoh-Merapoh trail is significantly shorter than the other two. A return trip on the Merapoh trail takes 3–4 days. A traverse from Kuala Tahan to Merapoh (or the other way around) takes around 5 days.

== Temperature ==
Mount Tahan can be relatively cold at night. Temperatures can range from 4 °C to 18 °C between December and January, and 7 °C to 27 °C between June and September. Frost can sometimes appear at the summit.

== 1905 Federated Malay States Museums expedition ==
In 1905, the director of the Federated Malay States Museums, Leonard Wray Jnr, and Selangor Museum curator Herbert Robinson led a museum collecting expedition to Gunung Tahan.

The expedition involved sixty-five men and lasted five months. Dato’ To Muntri Idin and Penghulu Panglima Kakap Husin laid the groundwork before the main party arrived. On July 15, Bulang, Che Nik, Mat Aris, Mu’min and Robinson were the first to reach the summit.

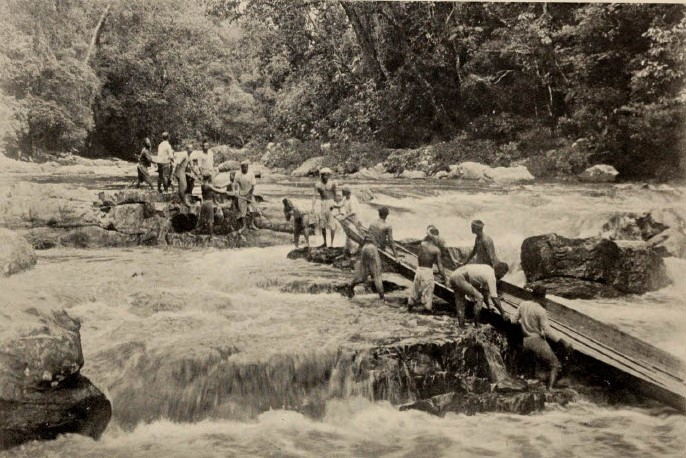
Pulling boats up the rapids in the Tahan river

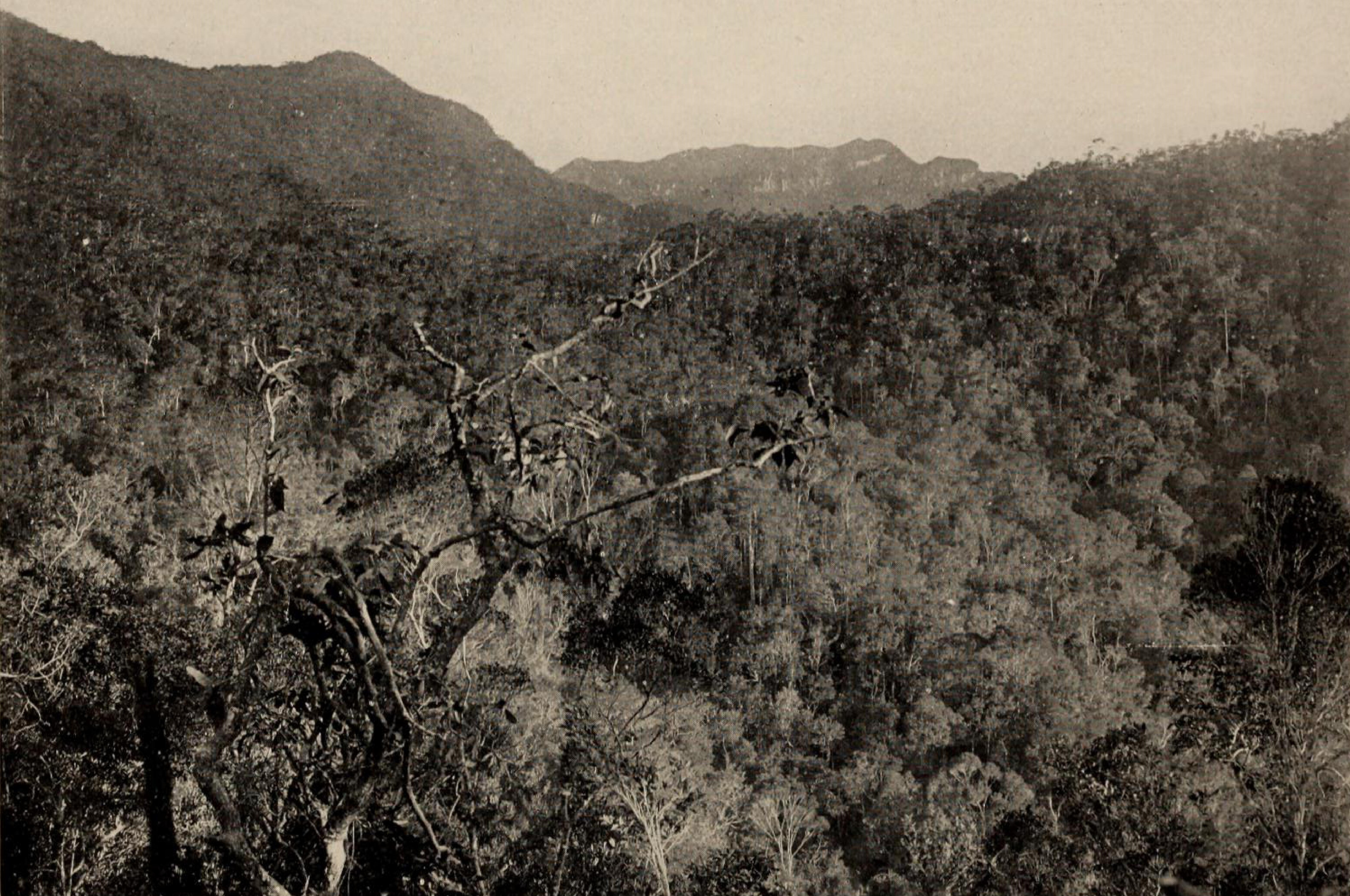
Gunung Tahan from sixth camp
Birds collected during the expedition

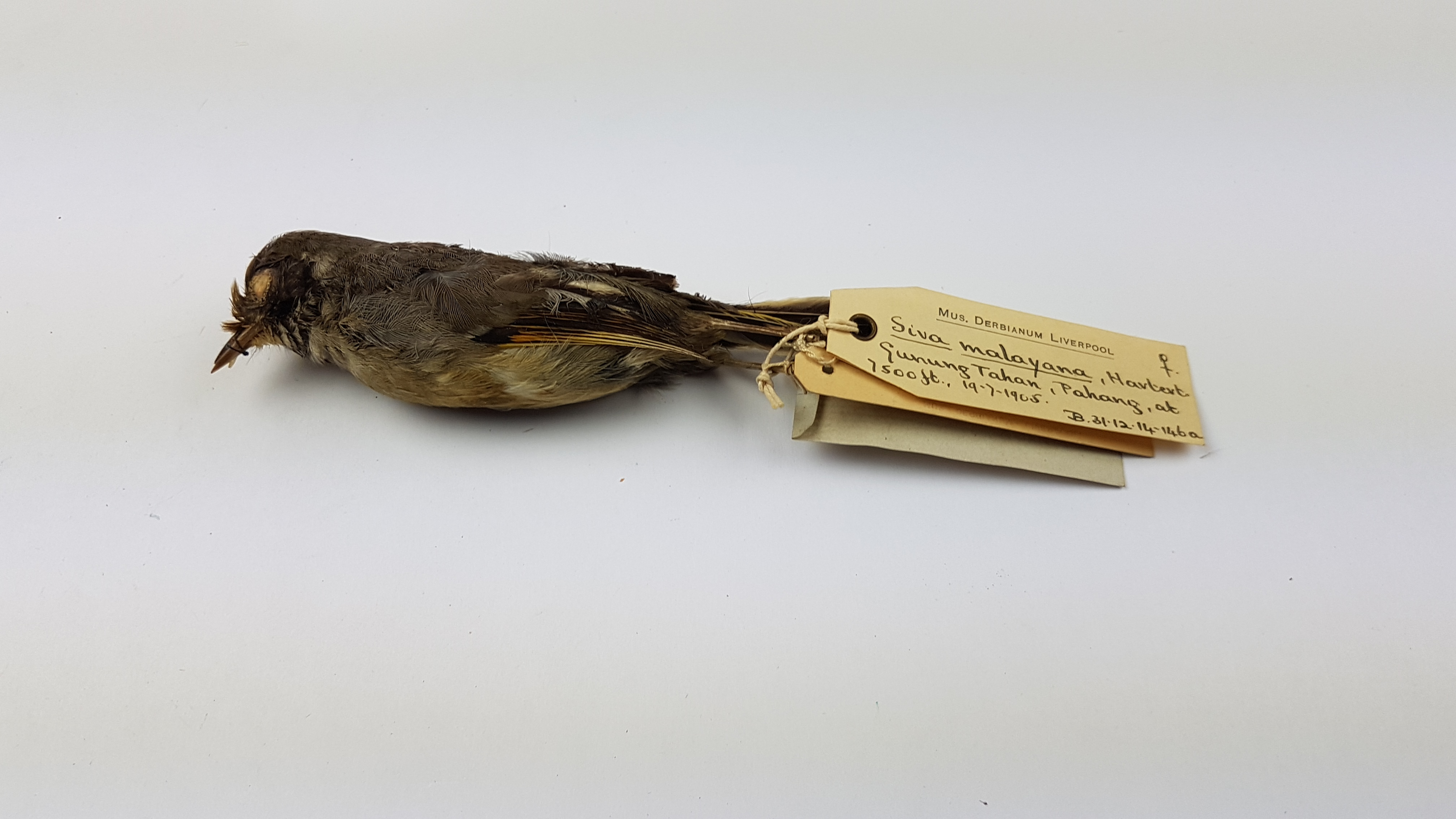
Bar-throated minla

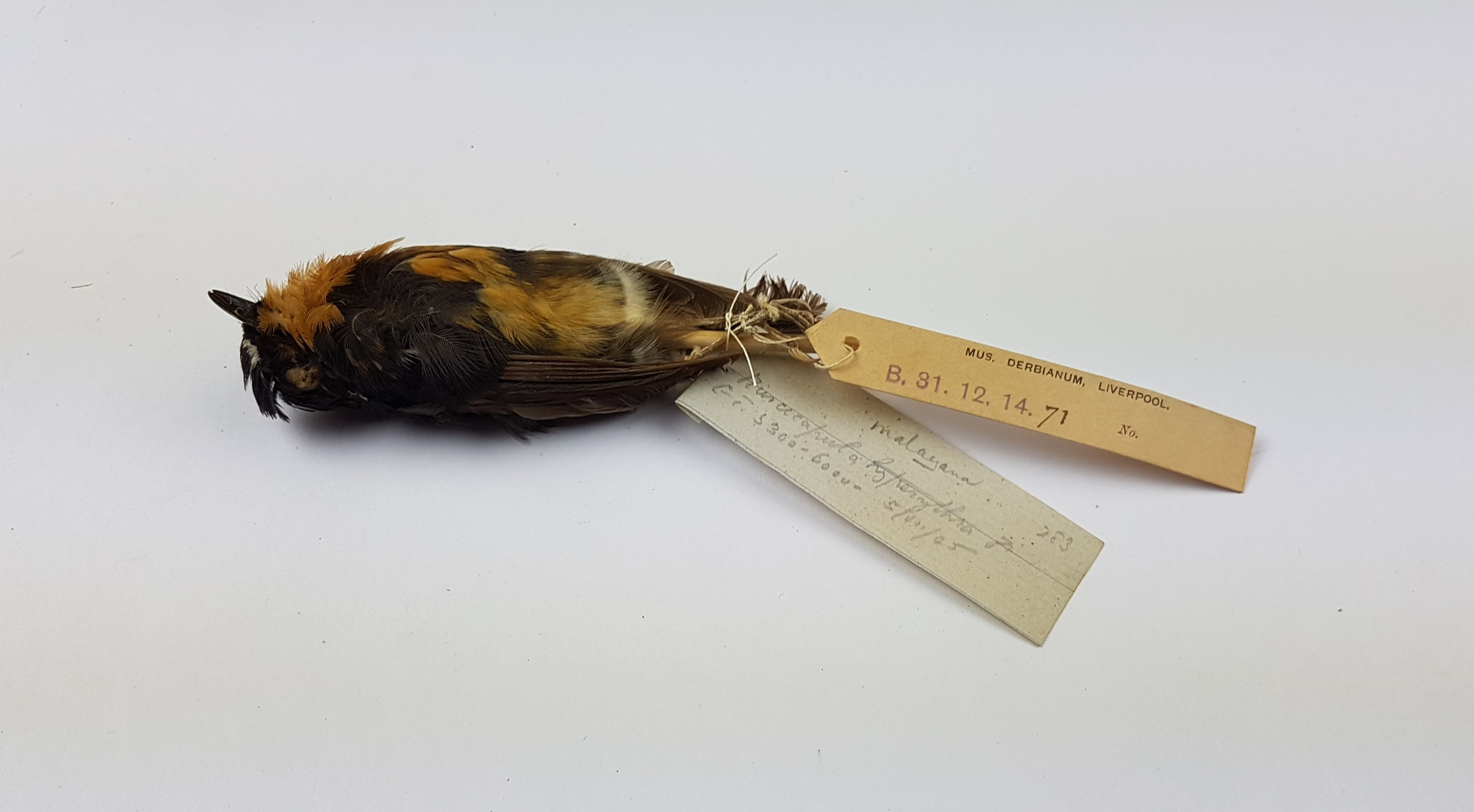
Snowy-browed flycatcher

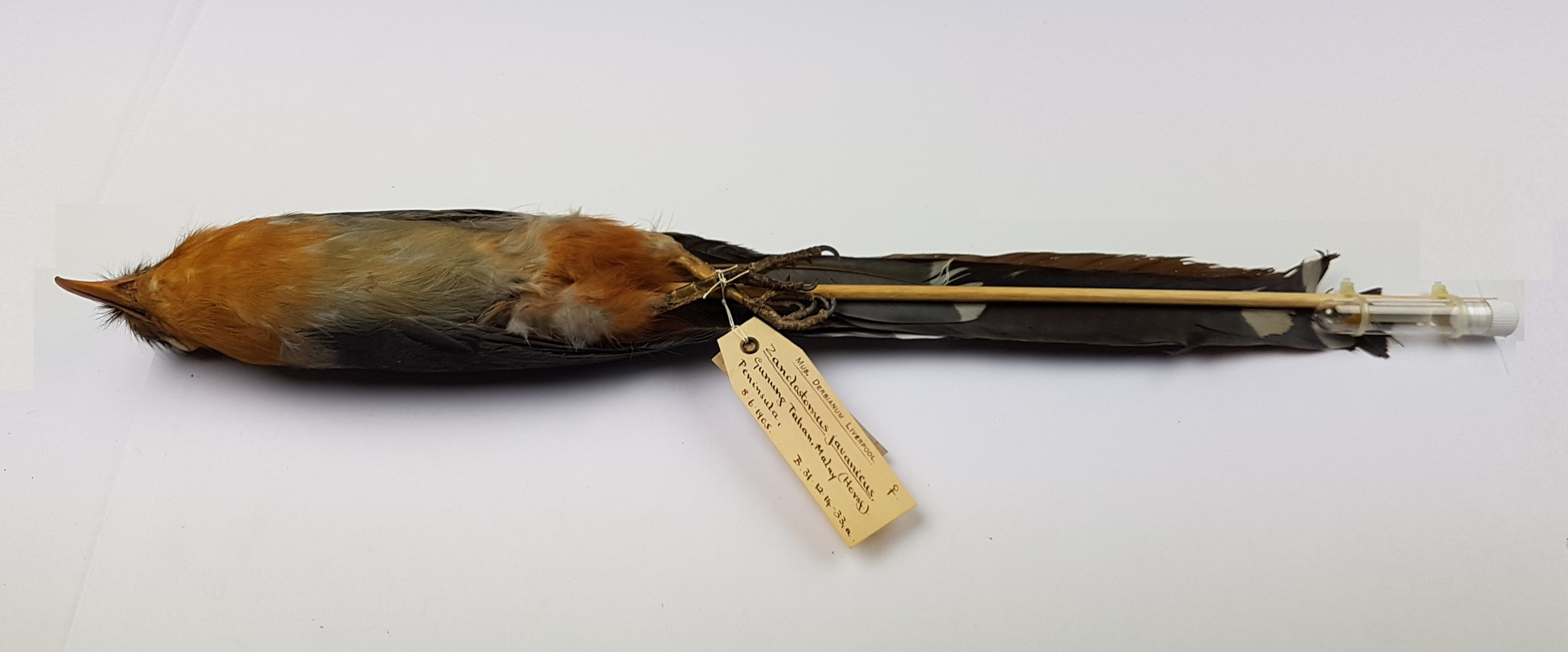
Red-billed malkoha

== Hikers Gallery ==
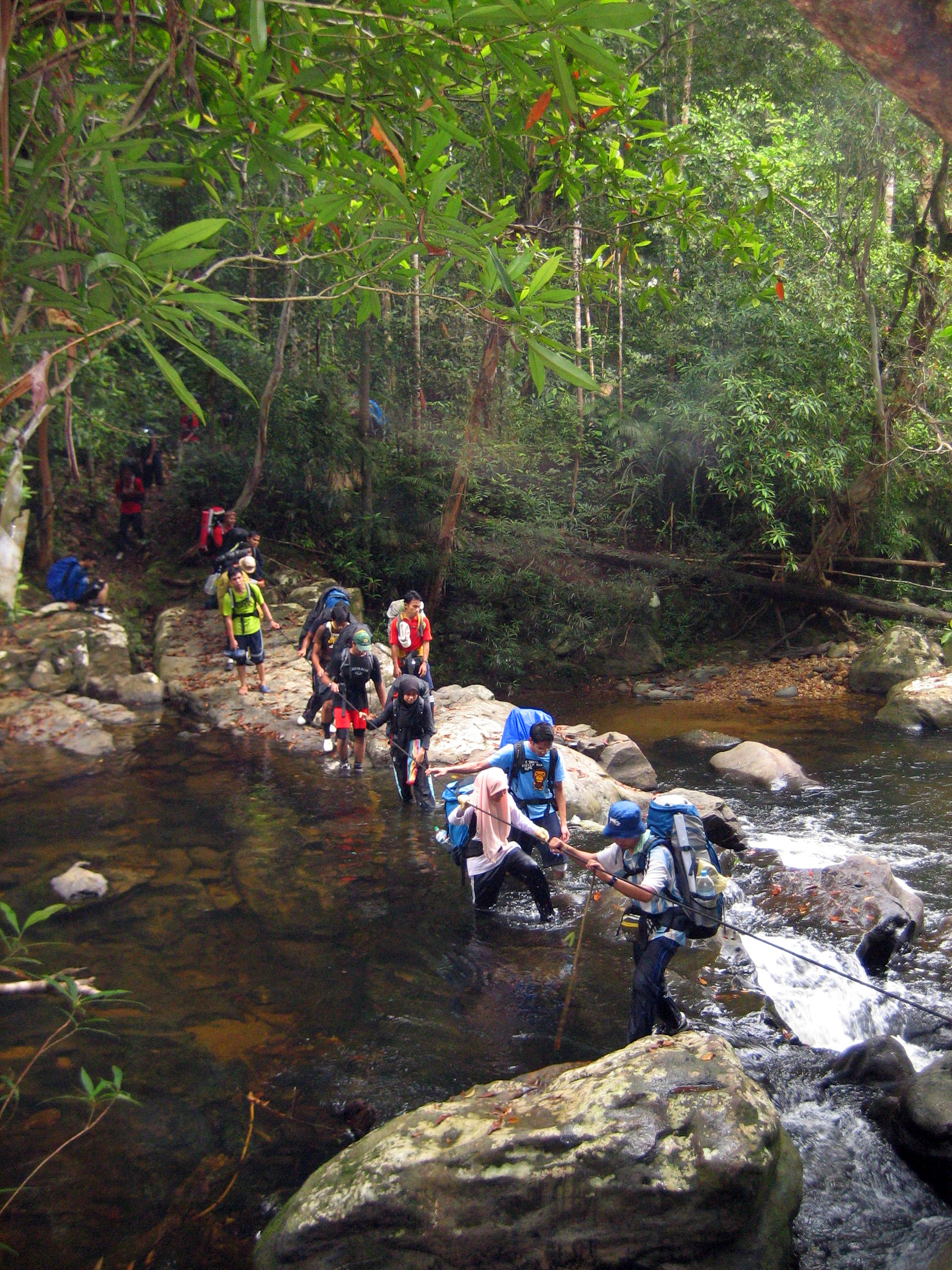
Hikers fording near Kuala Juram

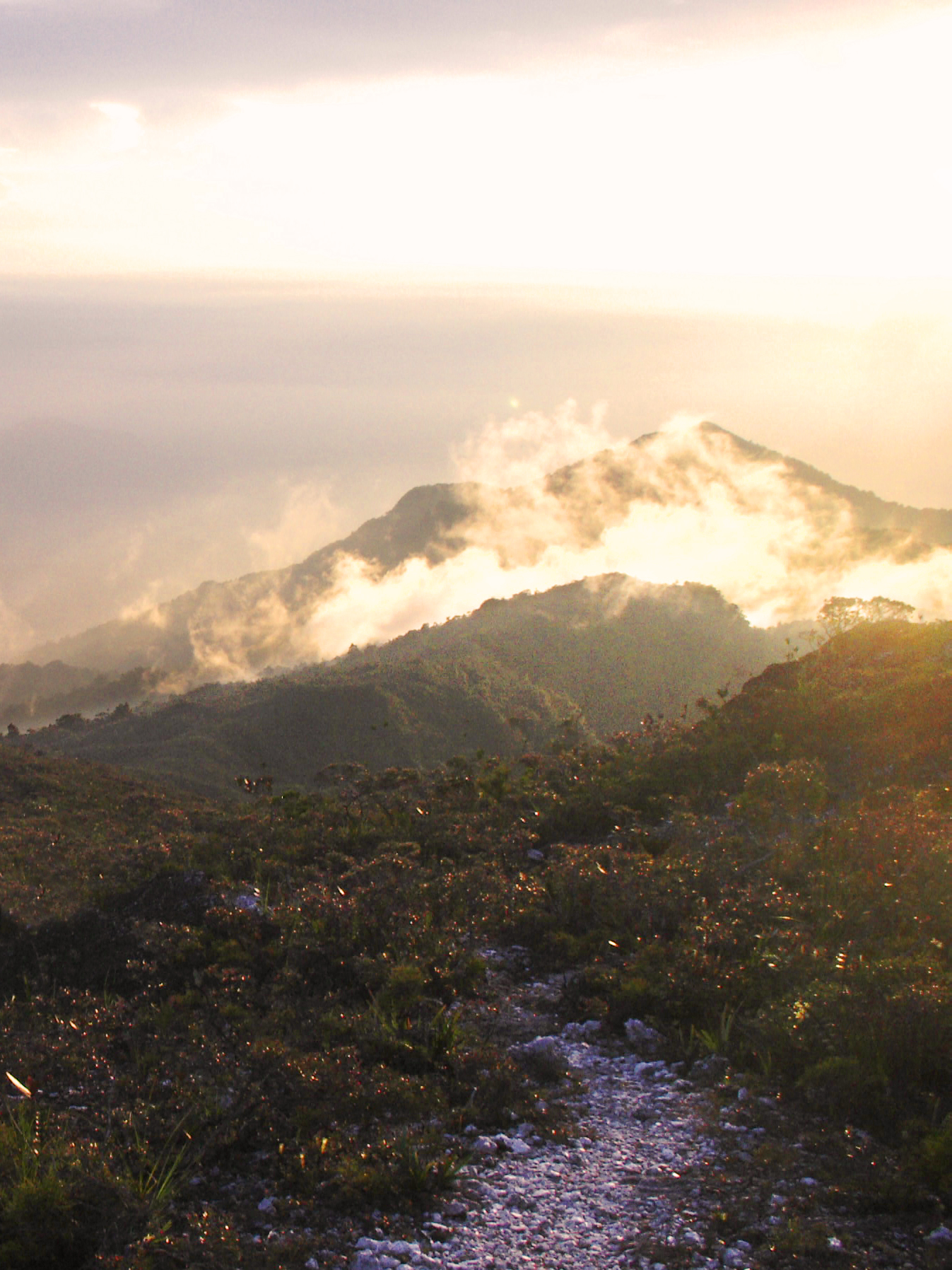
Sunset near Kem Botak

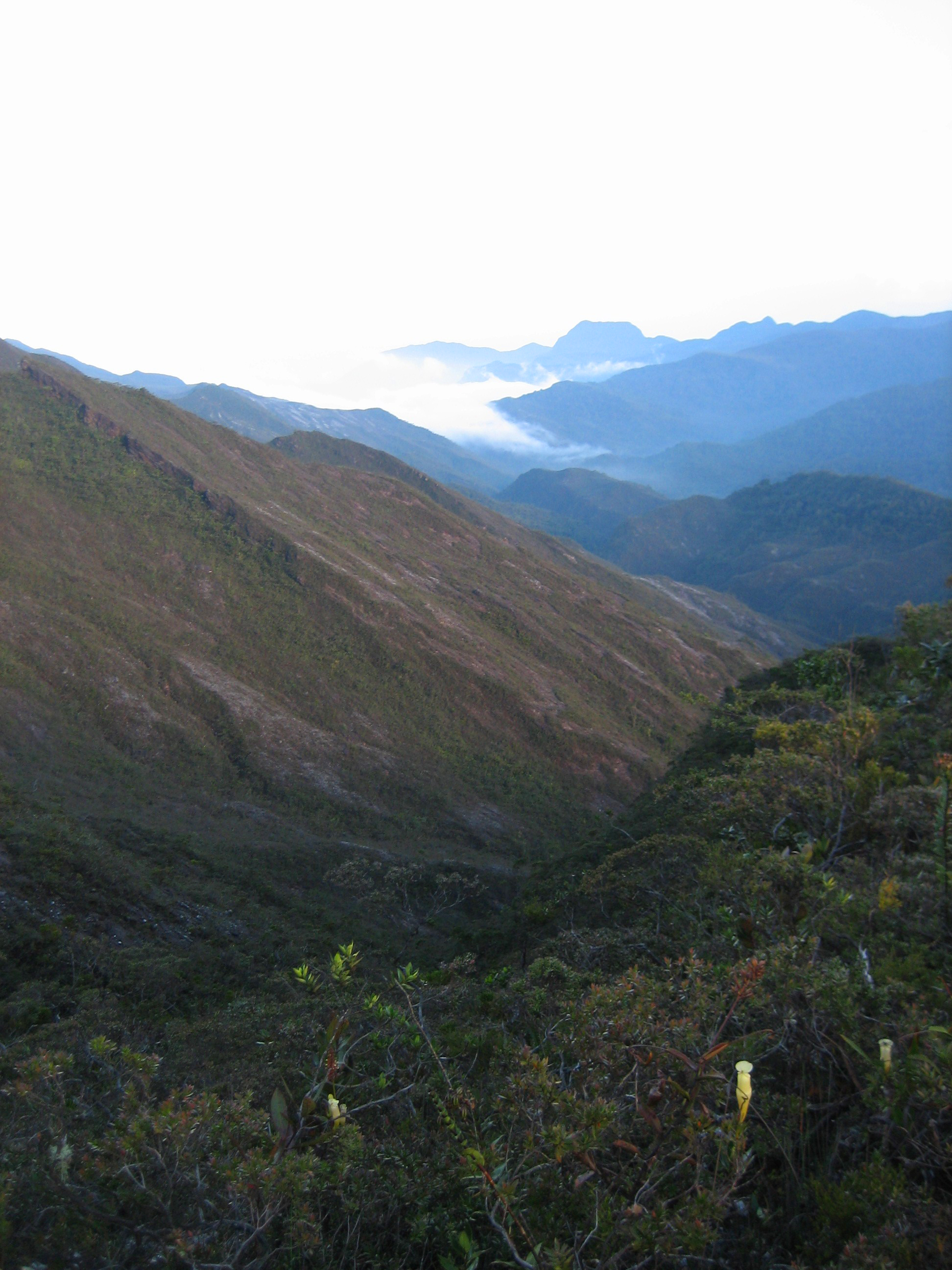
View at dawn near Kem Botak

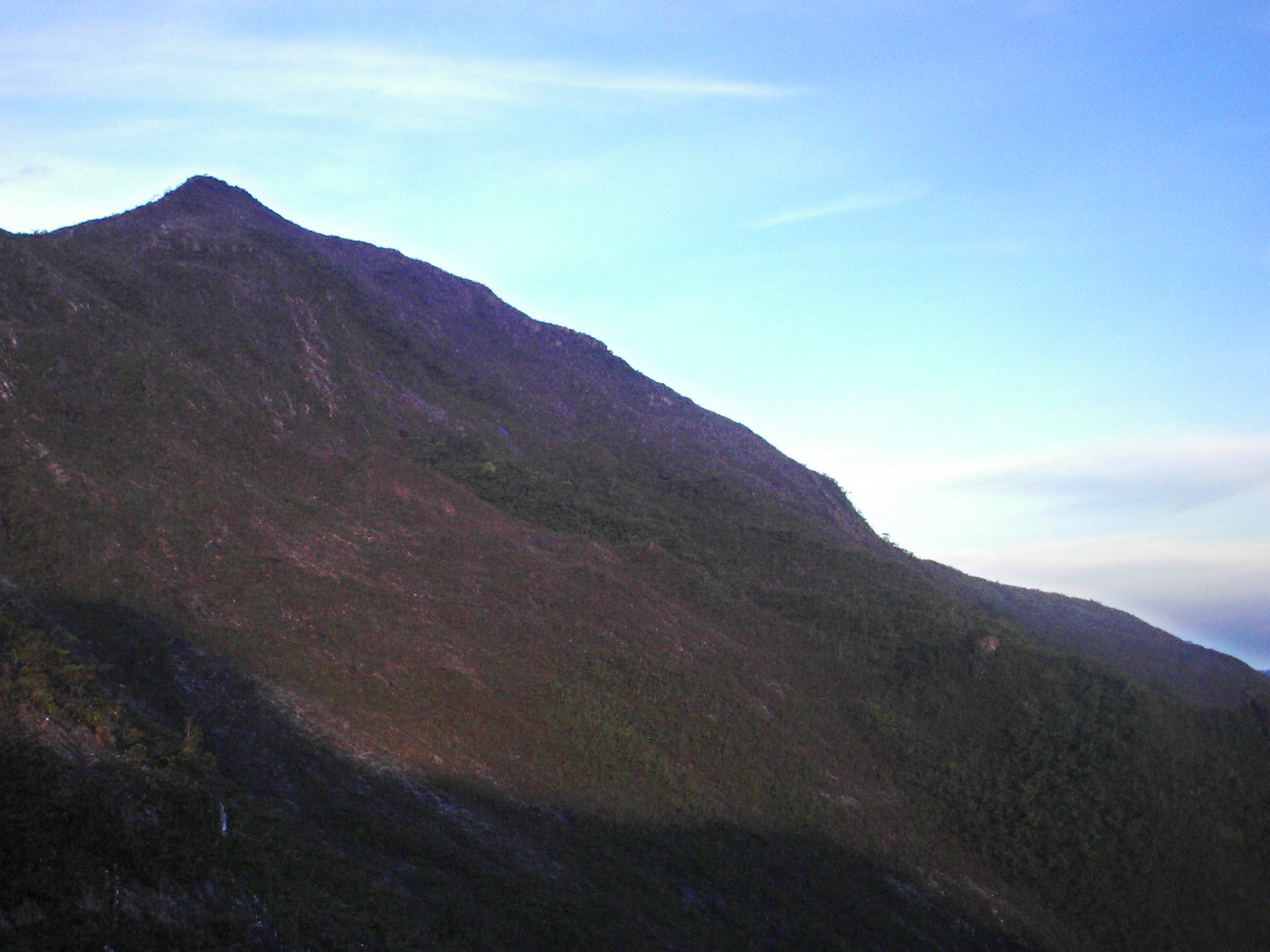
Unnamed lesser peak, viewed from Kem Botak

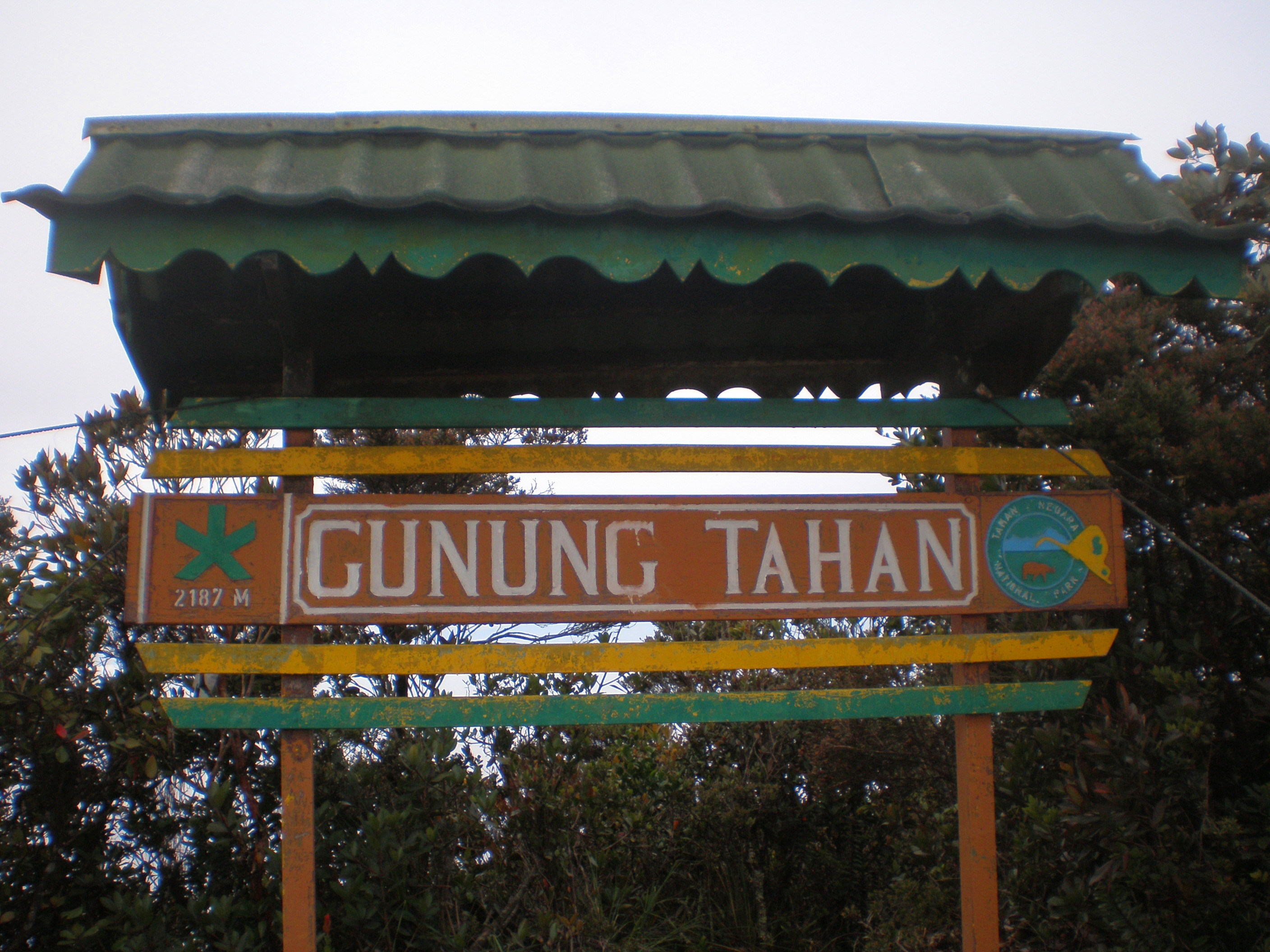
Wooden signboard at the peak. The roof has been torn off due to severe weather in recent years

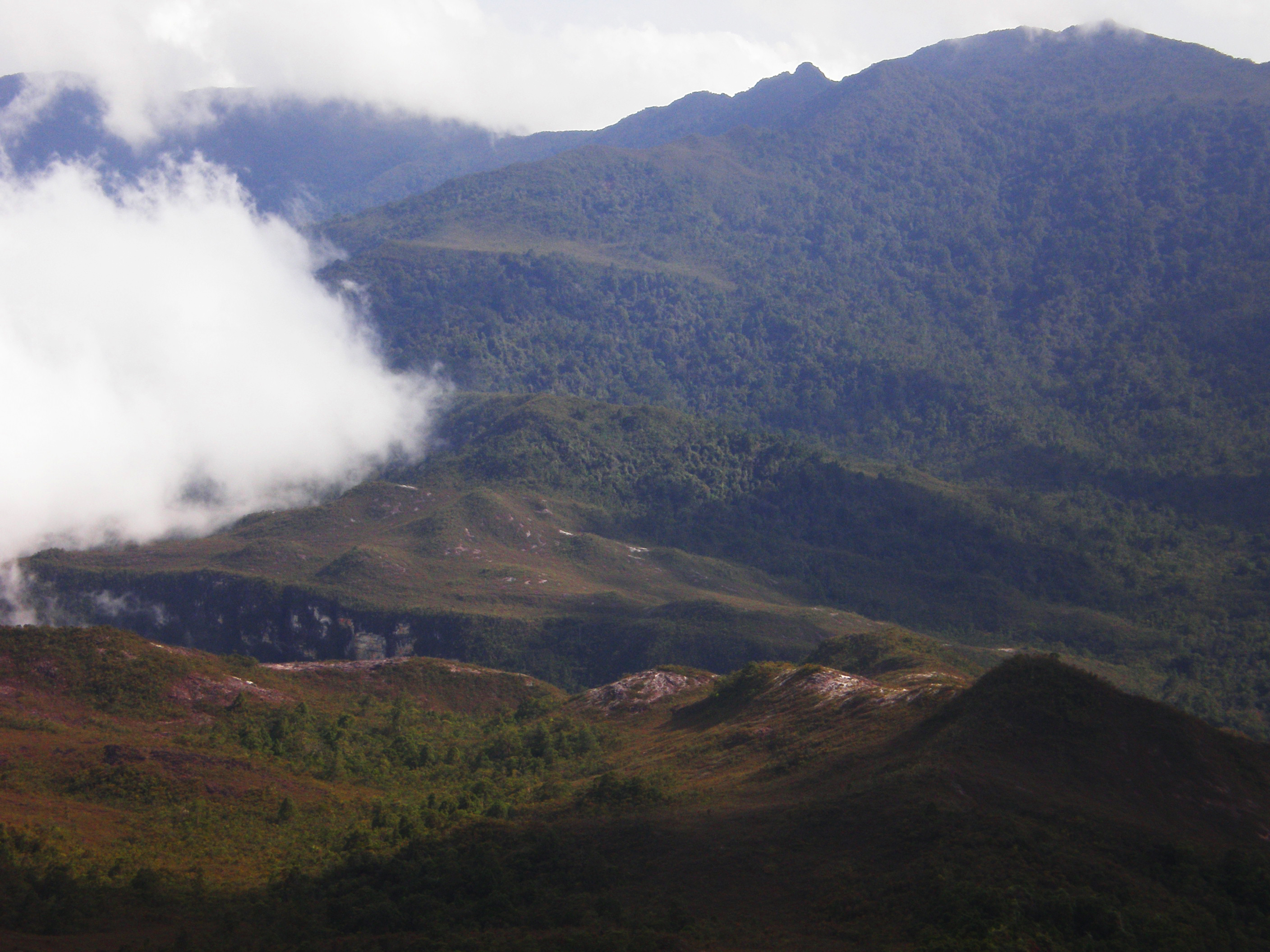
Lembah Teku, above Kem Gedung

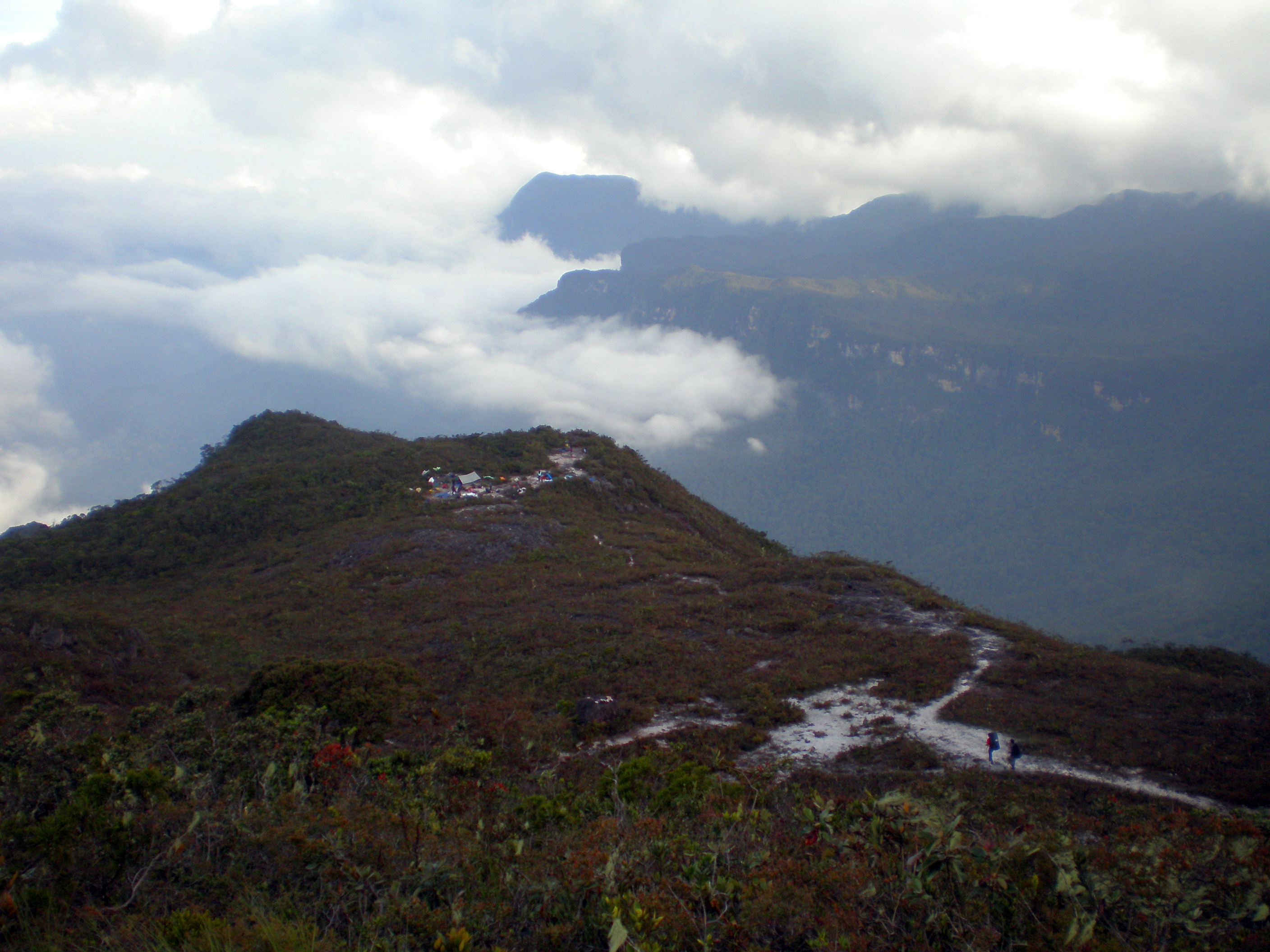
Kem Gedung

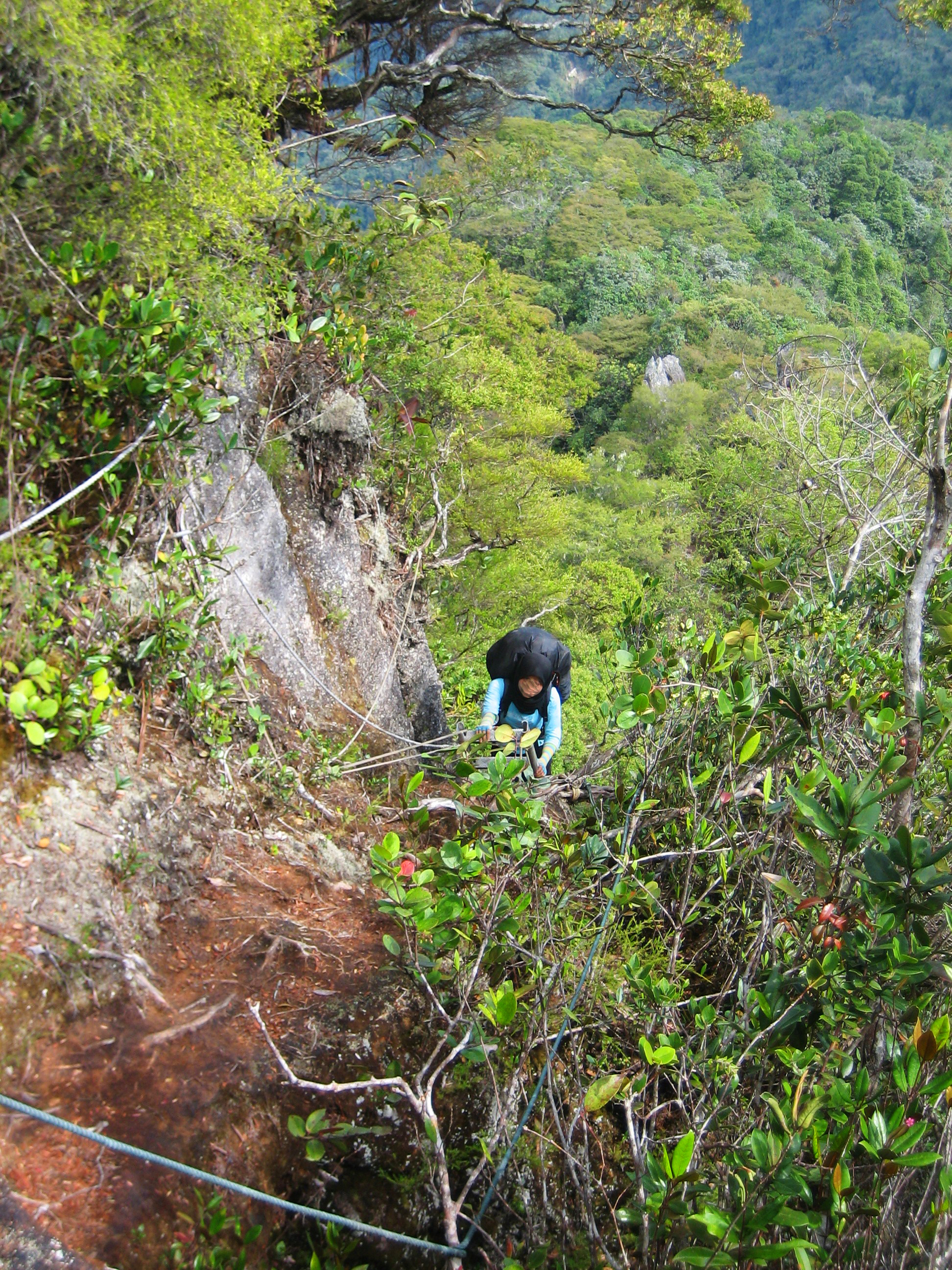
Steep descent via a series of metal ladders at Gunung Tangga Lima Belas

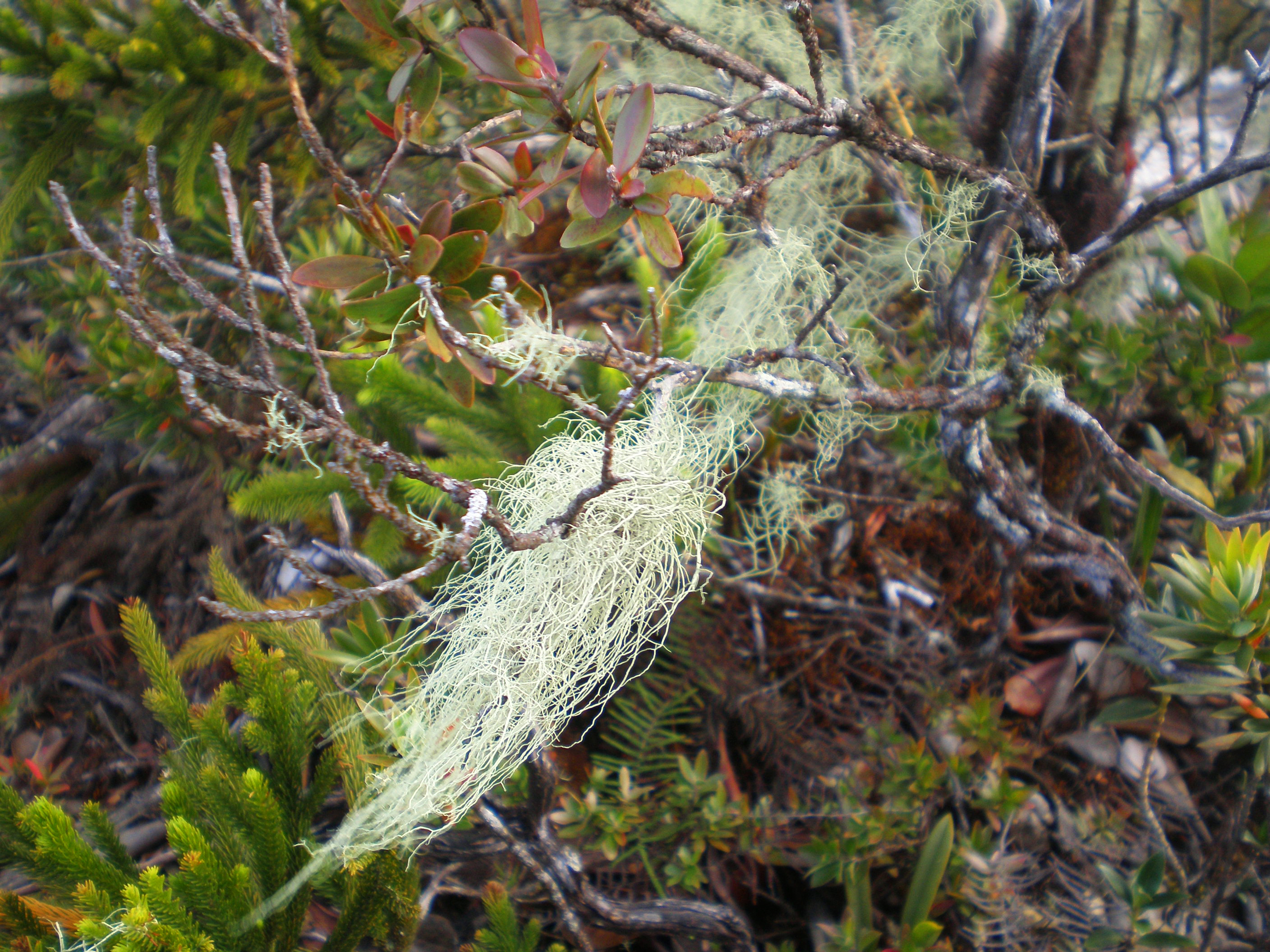
Usnea near the peak

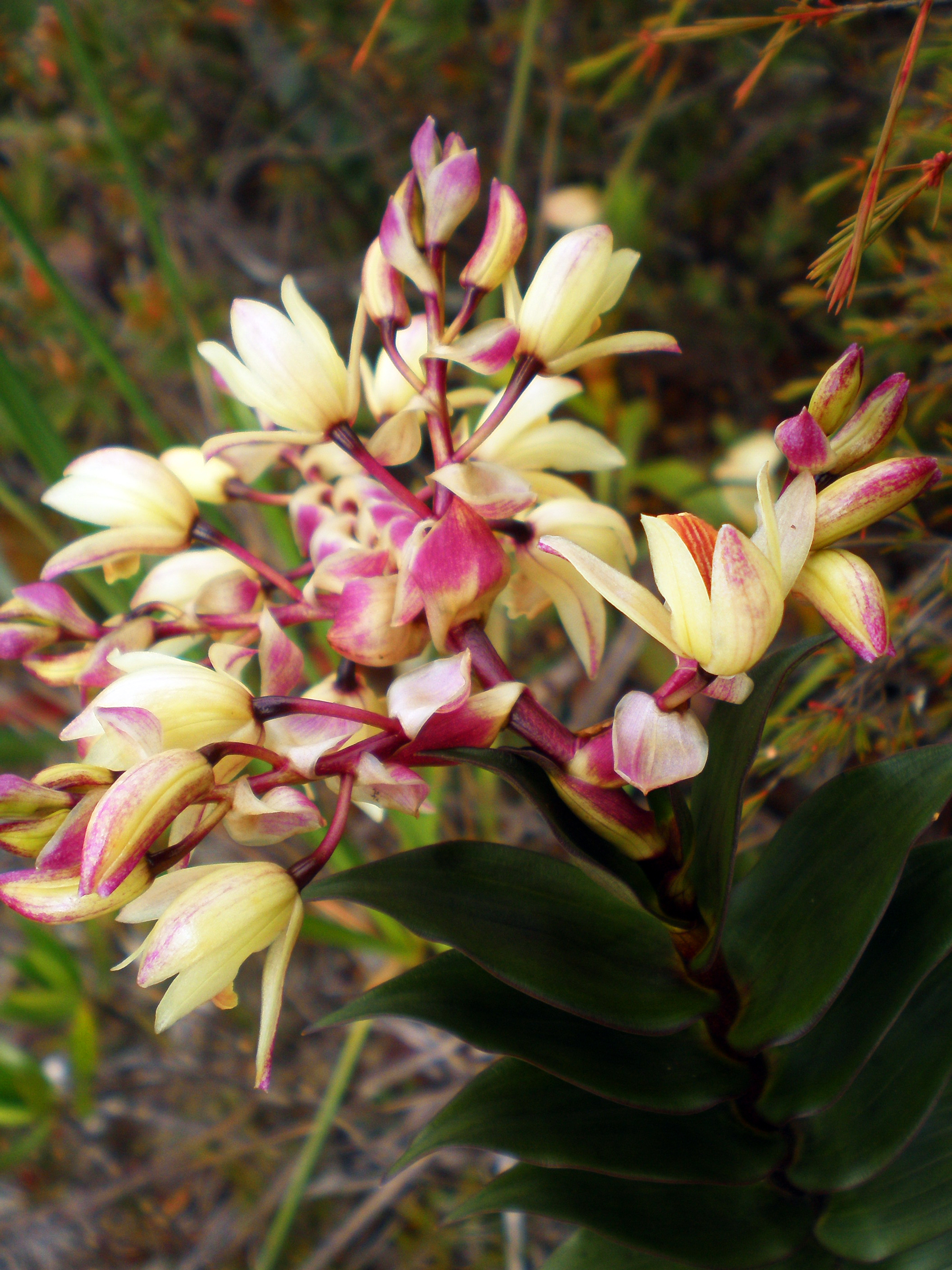
Orchids near the peak

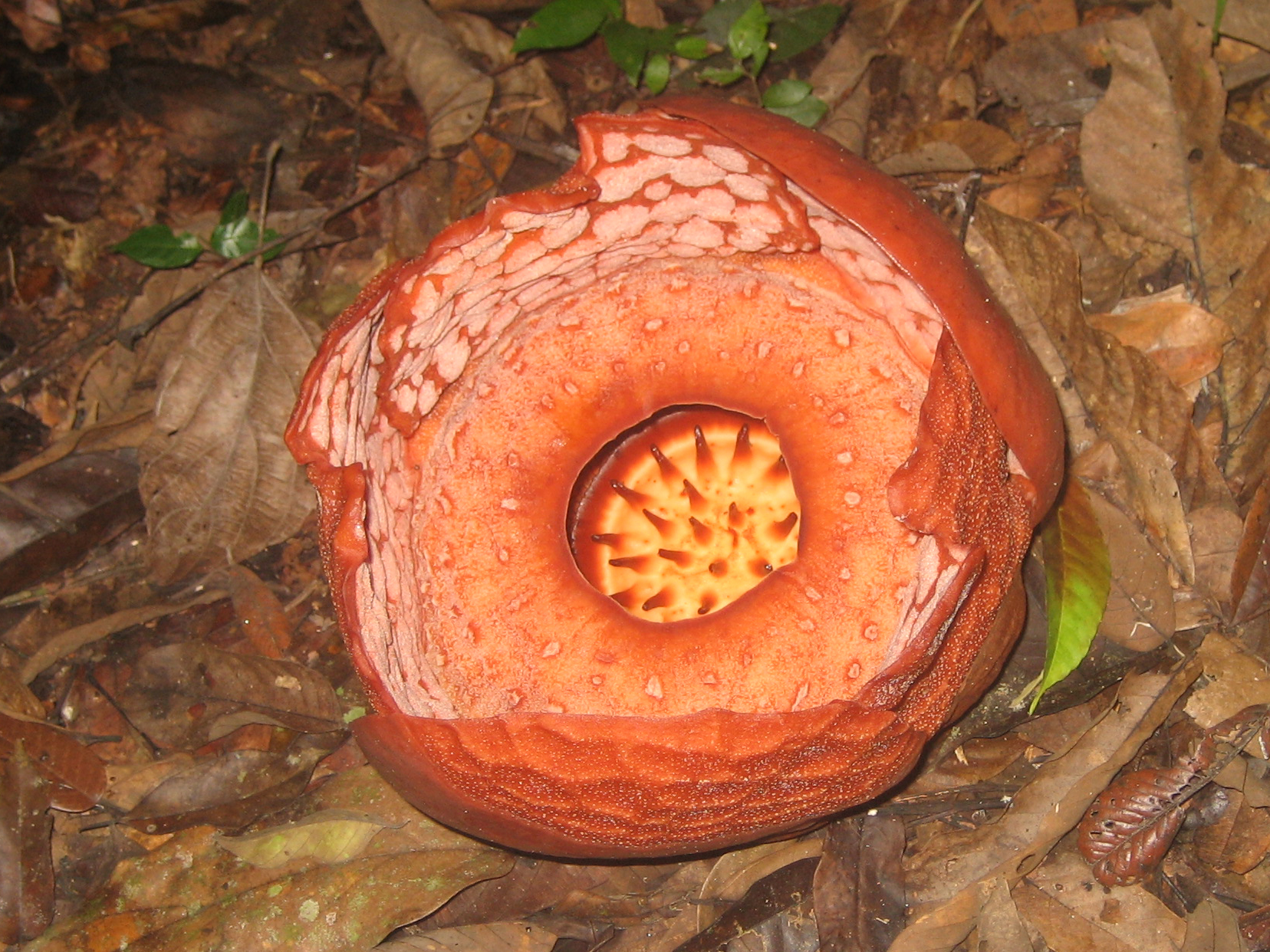
Rafflesia near Wray's Camp

== See also ==
- List of mountains in Malaysia
- List of Southeast Asian mountains
- List of ultras of Southeast Asia
