= Tahan Range =

Mountain range in Malaysia

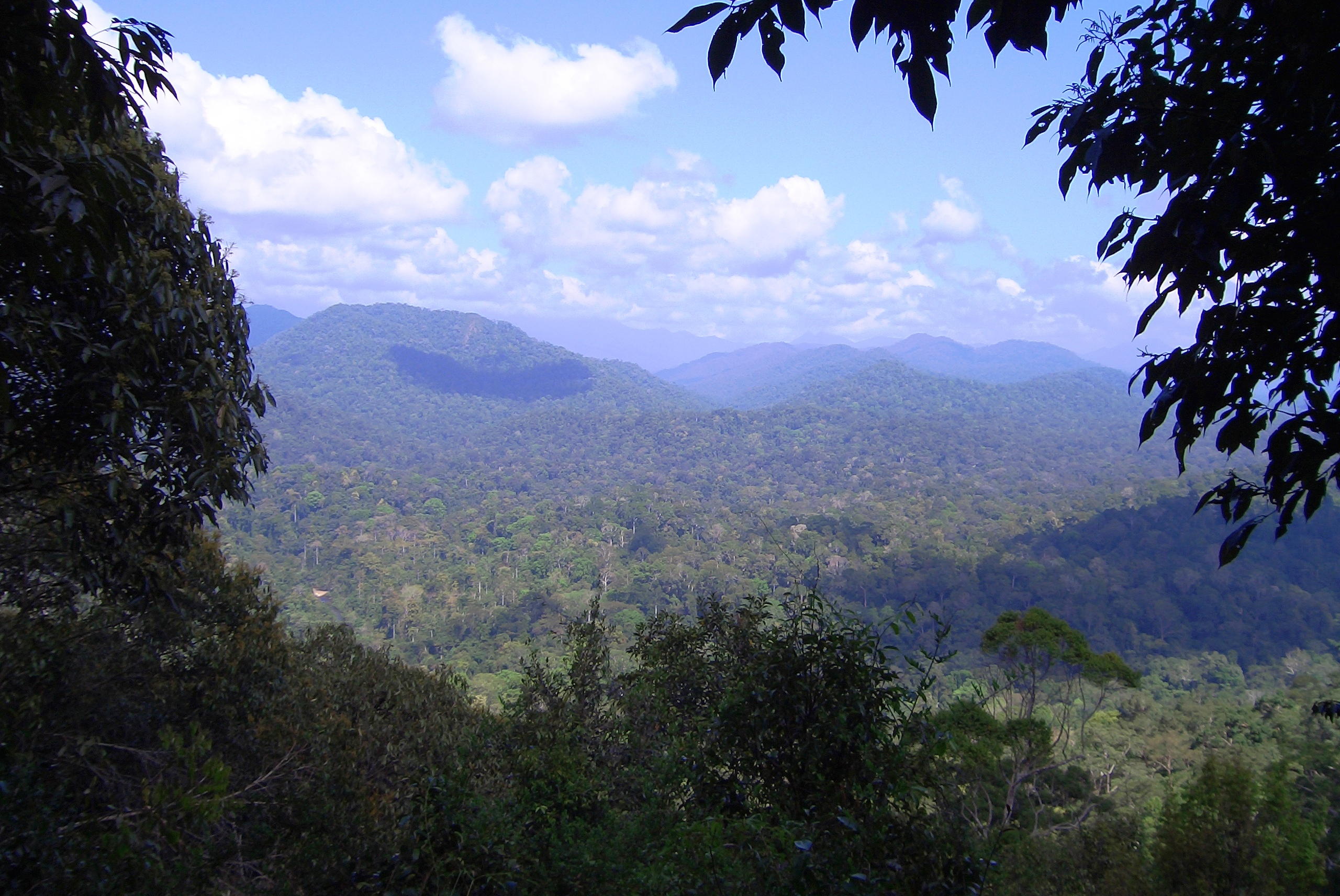
The Tahan Range within Taman Negara.

Tahan Range (Malay: Banjaran Tahan) is a mountain range in Pahang and Kelantan, Malaysia. Along with the Titiwangsa Mountains to its west, the Tahan Range forms the southernmost extension of the larger Tenasserim Hills chain of mountains. Its namesake highest peak, Gunung Tahan, is the tallest mountain in Peninsular Malaysia and the whole Tenasserim Hills, standing at 2,187 metres above sea level.
