= Geography of Malaysia =

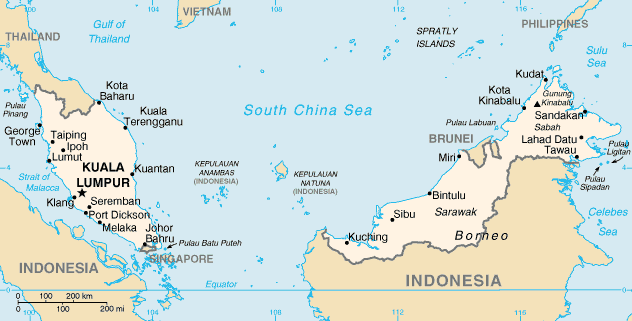
- Continent: Asia
- Region: Southeast Asia
- Coordinates: 2°30'N 112°30'E
- Area: Ranked 67th
  - Total: 330,803 km^{2} (127,724 sq mi)
  - Land: 99.63%
  - Water: 0.37%
- Coastline: 4,675 km (2,905 mi)
- Borders: Total land borders 2,669 km (1,658 mi); Thailand: 506 km (314 mi); Indonesia: 1,782 km (1,107 mi); Brunei: 281 km (175 mi)
- Highest point: Mount Kinabalu (4,095.2 m)
- Lowest point: Indian Ocean (0 m)
- Longest river: Rajang River
- Largest lake: Kenyir Lake (manmade); Bera Lake (natural)
- Exclusive economic zone: 334,671 km^{2} (129,217 mi^{2})

The geography of Malaysia includes both the physical and the human geography of Malaysia, a Southeast Asian country made up of two major landmasses separated by water—Peninsular Malaysia to the west and East Malaysia to the east—and numerous smaller islands that surround those landmasses. Peninsular Malaysia is on the southernmost part of the Malay Peninsula, south of Thailand, north of Singapore and east of the Indonesian island of Sumatra; East Malaysia comprises most of the northern part of Borneo, and shares land borders with Brunei to the north and Indonesian Borneo to the south.

== Climate ==
Köppen–Geiger climate classification map of Malaysia.

Located near the equator, Malaysia's climate is categorised as equatorial, being hot and humid throughout the year. The average rainfall is 250 centimetres (98 in) a year and the average temperature is 25.4 °C (77.7 °F). The climates of Peninsular Malaysia and the East Malaysia differ, as the climate on the peninsula is directly affected by wind from the mainland, as opposed to the more maritime weather of East Malaysia. Malaysia is exposed to the El Niño effect, which reduces rainfall in the dry season. Climate change is likely to have a significant effect on Malaysia, increasing sea levels and rainfall, increasing flooding risks and leading to large droughts.

Malaysia faces two monsoon winds seasons, the southwest monsoon from late May to September, and the northeast monsoon from October to March. The northeast monsoon brings in more rainfall compared to the southwest monsoon, originating in China and the North Pacific. The southwest monsoon originates from the deserts of Australia. March and October form transitions between the two monsoons.

Local climates are affected by the presence of mountain ranges throughout Malaysia, and climate can be divided into that of the highlands, the lowlands, and coastal regions. The coasts have a sunny climate, with temperatures ranging between 23 and 32 °C (73.4 and 89.6 °F), and rainfall ranging from 10 to 30 centimetres (4 to 12 in) a month. The lowlands have a similar temperature, but follow a more distinctive rainfall pattern and show very high humidity levels. The highlands are cooler and wetter, and display a greater temperature variation. A large amount of cloud cover is present over the highlands, which have humidity levels that do not fall below 75%.

The highest temperature was recorded at Chuping, Perlis on 9 April 1998 at 40.1 °C (104.2 °F). The lowest temperature ever recorded in Malaysia was on Mount Kinabalu at −5 °C (23 °F) on 7 April 2023. The highest rainfall recorded in a day was 608 mm (23.9 in) in Kota Bharu, Kelantan on 6 January 1967. The highest rainfall recorded in a year was 5,687 mm (223.9 in) at Sandakan, Sabah in 2006. Meanwhile, the lowest rainfall recorded in a year was 1,151 mm (45.3 in) at Tawau, Sabah in 1997. The wettest place in Malaysia is Kuching, Sarawak with an average rainfall of 4,159 mm (163.7 in) with 279 days of rain a year. The driest place in Malaysia is in Sitiawan, Perak with average rainfall of 1,787 mm (70.4 in) a year.

As Malaysia is close to the equator, snowfall is extremely rare in the country, and has only ever occurred on Mount Kinabalu in 1975, 1993, 2018, and 2022.

Climate data for Kuala Lumpur (Sultan Abdul Aziz Shah Airport) (1991–2020 normals, extremes 1963–2020)
Month	Jan	Feb	Mar	Apr	May	Jun	Jul	Aug	Sep	Oct	Nov	Dec	Year
Record high °C (°F)	38.0 (100.4)	36.7 (98.1)	37.9 (100.2)	37.2 (99.0)	38.5 (101.3)	36.6 (97.9)	36.7 (98.1)	38.0 (100.4)	35.9 (96.6)	37.0 (98.6)	36.0 (96.8)	35.5 (95.9)	38.5 (101.3)
Mean daily maximum °C (°F)	32.6 (90.7)	33.3 (91.9)	33.7 (92.7)	33.7 (92.7)	33.6 (92.5)	33.3 (91.9)	32.8 (91.0)	32.8 (91.0)	32.7 (90.9)	32.6 (90.7)	32.3 (90.1)	32.0 (89.6)	32.9 (91.2)
Daily mean °C (°F)	27.3 (81.1)	27.8 (82.0)	28.1 (82.6)	28.1 (82.6)	28.5 (83.3)	28.4 (83.1)	28.0 (82.4)	28.0 (82.4)	27.7 (81.9)	27.5 (81.5)	27.1 (80.8)	27.1 (80.8)	27.8 (82.0)
Mean daily minimum °C (°F)	23.8 (74.8)	24.0 (75.2)	24.5 (76.1)	24.7 (76.5)	25.0 (77.0)	24.8 (76.6)	24.4 (75.9)	24.5 (76.1)	24.2 (75.6)	24.2 (75.6)	24.1 (75.4)	24.0 (75.2)	24.4 (75.9)
Record low °C (°F)	17.8 (64.0)	18.0 (64.4)	18.9 (66.0)	20.6 (69.1)	20.5 (68.9)	19.1 (66.4)	20.1 (68.2)	20.0 (68.0)	21.0 (69.8)	20.0 (68.0)	20.7 (69.3)	19.0 (66.2)	17.8 (64.0)
Average precipitation mm (inches)	226.7 (8.93)	192.8 (7.59)	270.4 (10.65)	301.5 (11.87)	229.9 (9.05)	145.8 (5.74)	165.2 (6.50)	174.3 (6.86)	220.3 (8.67)	283.8 (11.17)	355.8 (14.01)	280.6 (11.05)	2,847.1 (112.09)
Average precipitation days (≥ 1.0 mm)	13.6	11.9	15.0	16.8	13.2	9.6	10.6	10.9	13.3	16.3	19.7	16.3	167.2
Average relative humidity (%)	80	80	80	82	81	80	79	79	81	82	84	83	81
Mean monthly sunshine hours	185.0	192.4	207.9	198.8	206.8	194.4	200.2	189.0	163.8	169.1	152.3	162.6	2,222.3
Source 1: World Meteorological Organization
Source 2: Pogodaiklimat.ru NOAA (sunshine hours, 1961–1990)

Climate data for Klang
Month	Jan	Feb	Mar	Apr	May	Jun	Jul	Aug	Sep	Oct	Nov	Dec	Year
Mean daily maximum °C (°F)	31.0 (87.8)	31.7 (89.1)	32.3 (90.1)	32.0 (89.6)	31.9 (89.4)	31.8 (89.2)	31.4 (88.5)	31.3 (88.3)	31.2 (88.2)	31.1 (88.0)	30.8 (87.4)	30.7 (87.3)	31.4 (88.6)
Daily mean °C (°F)	26.3 (79.3)	26.7 (80.1)	27.2 (81.0)	27.3 (81.1)	27.4 (81.3)	27.3 (81.1)	26.8 (80.2)	26.7 (80.1)	26.8 (80.2)	26.7 (80.1)	26.5 (79.7)	26.3 (79.3)	26.8 (80.3)
Mean daily minimum °C (°F)	21.6 (70.9)	21.7 (71.1)	22.1 (71.8)	22.7 (72.9)	23.0 (73.4)	22.8 (73.0)	22.3 (72.1)	22.2 (72.0)	22.4 (72.3)	22.4 (72.3)	22.3 (72.1)	22.0 (71.6)	22.3 (72.1)
Average rainfall mm (inches)	179 (7.0)	139 (5.5)	207 (8.1)	222 (8.7)	173 (6.8)	108 (4.3)	107 (4.2)	150 (5.9)	179 (7.0)	246 (9.7)	265 (10.4)	233 (9.2)	2,208 (86.8)
Source: Climate-Data.org

Climate data for Kuching (1991–2020 normals, extremes 1876–present)
Month	Jan	Feb	Mar	Apr	May	Jun	Jul	Aug	Sep	Oct	Nov	Dec	Year
Record high °C (°F)	34.6 (94.3)	34.7 (94.5)	35.2 (95.4)	36.1 (97.0)	36.0 (96.8)	35.6 (96.1)	36.1 (97.0)	36.4 (97.5)	37.1 (98.8)	36.5 (97.7)	34.8 (94.6)	34.7 (94.5)	37.1 (98.8)
Mean daily maximum °C (°F)	30.0 (86.0)	30.2 (86.4)	31.4 (88.5)	32.4 (90.3)	32.7 (90.9)	32.6 (90.7)	32.5 (90.5)	32.6 (90.7)	32.1 (89.8)	32.0 (89.6)	31.7 (89.1)	31.0 (87.8)	31.8 (89.2)
Daily mean °C (°F)	25.9 (78.6)	26.0 (78.8)	26.5 (79.7)	26.8 (80.2)	27.1 (80.8)	27.0 (80.6)	27.0 (80.6)	26.9 (80.4)	26.6 (79.9)	26.3 (79.3)	26.2 (79.2)	26.0 (78.8)	26.5 (79.7)
Mean daily minimum °C (°F)	23.3 (73.9)	23.4 (74.1)	23.6 (74.5)	23.7 (74.7)	23.9 (75.0)	23.7 (74.7)	23.4 (74.1)	23.4 (74.1)	23.3 (73.9)	23.3 (73.9)	23.3 (73.9)	23.3 (73.9)	23.5 (74.3)
Record low °C (°F)	17.8 (64.0)	18.9 (66.0)	18.3 (64.9)	20.0 (68.0)	20.6 (69.1)	18.9 (66.0)	19.4 (66.9)	19.4 (66.9)	19.3 (66.7)	20.5 (68.9)	20.0 (68.0)	18.9 (66.0)	17.8 (64.0)
Average precipitation mm (inches)	672.3 (26.47)	501.4 (19.74)	340.2 (13.39)	303.2 (11.94)	267.8 (10.54)	255.4 (10.06)	200.9 (7.91)	263.7 (10.38)	245.3 (9.66)	343.1 (13.51)	341.5 (13.44)	498.1 (19.61)	4,232.7 (166.64)
Average precipitation days (≥ 1.0 mm)	21.4	17.0	17.6	17.4	15.9	14.5	13.1	14.7	15.8	19.1	21.2	22.8	210.5
Average relative humidity (%)	89	88	86	86	86	84	83	83	85	86	88	89	86
Mean monthly sunshine hours	126	137	149	154	156	159	165	163	158	152	149	136	1,804
Source 1: NOAA
Source 2: Ogimet Meteo Climat (record highs and lows), Deutscher Wetterdienst (humidity, 1975–1985)

=== Climate change ===
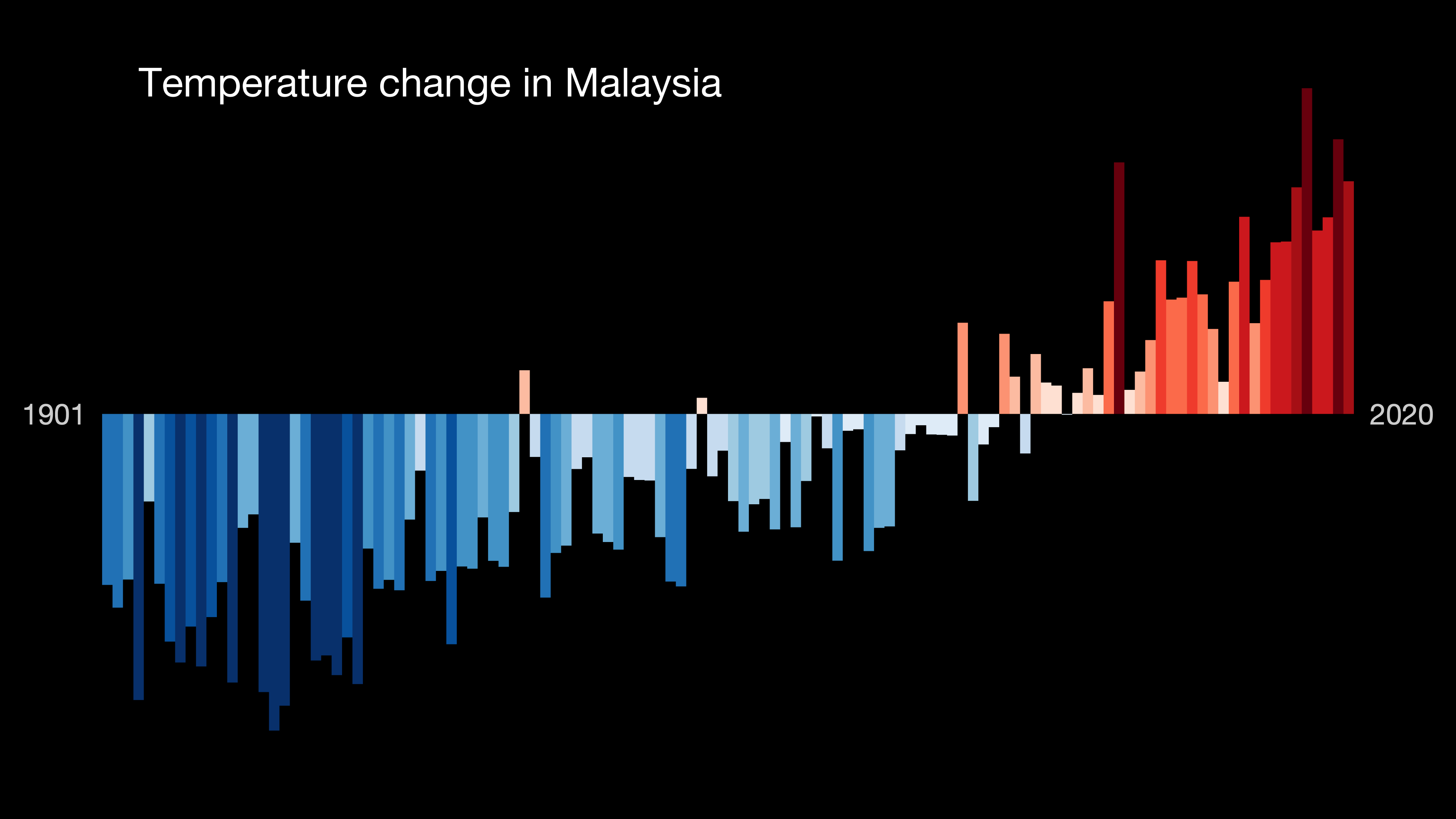
Graph showing temperature anomaly in Malaysia between 1901 and 2021.

Climate change is having a considerable impact in Malaysia. Increasing temperatures are likely to greatly increase the number of heatwaves occurring annually. Variations in precipitation may increase the frequency of droughts and floods in various local areas. Sea level rise may inundate some coastal areas. These impacts are expected to have numerous environmental and socioeconomic effects, exacerbating existing environmental issues and reinforcing inequality.

Malaysia itself contributes emissions given its significant use of coal and natural gas. However, the use of hydropower has expanded in the 21st century, and other potential energy sources such as solar power and biomass are being explored. The government anticipates the need to adapt in areas such as health and coastal defences, and has ratified the Paris Agreement.

== Geology ==
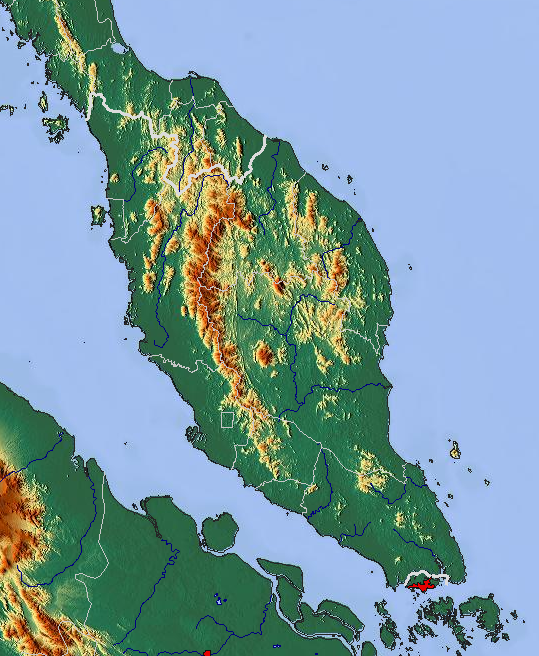
The topography of Peninsular Malaysia.

Malaysia is located on the Sunda Shelf, and is tectonically inactive. The oldest rocks in the country date from 540 million years ago, and are mostly sedimentary. The most common kind of rock is limestone that formed during the Paleozoic Era. Limestone that had accreted in East Malaysia during the Tertiary period later eroded, forming basins of sedimentary rocks that are rich in oil and natural gas. The mountain ranges in Malaysia were formed through orogenesis beginning in the Mesozoic Era.

The total land area of Malaysia is 330,803 square kilometres (127,720 sq mi), the 66th largest country in the world in terms of area. It is the only country to contain land on both mainland Asia and the Malay Archipelago. Peninsular Malaysia makes up 132,090 square kilometres (51,000 sq mi), or almost 40% of the country's land area, while East Malaysia covers 198,847 square kilometres (76,780 sq mi), or 60%. From the total land area, 1,200 square kilometres (460 sq mi) or 0.37% is made up of water such as lakes, rivers, or other internal waters. Malaysia has a total coastline of 4,675 kilometres (2,905 mi), and Peninsular Malaysia has 2,068 kilometres (1,285 mi), while East Malaysia has 2,607 kilometres (1,620 mi) of coastline.

Malaysia has the 29th longest coastline in the world. The two distinct parts of Malaysia, separated from each other by the South China Sea, share a largely similar landscape in that both Peninsular Malaysia and East Malaysia feature coastal plains rising to hills and mountains.

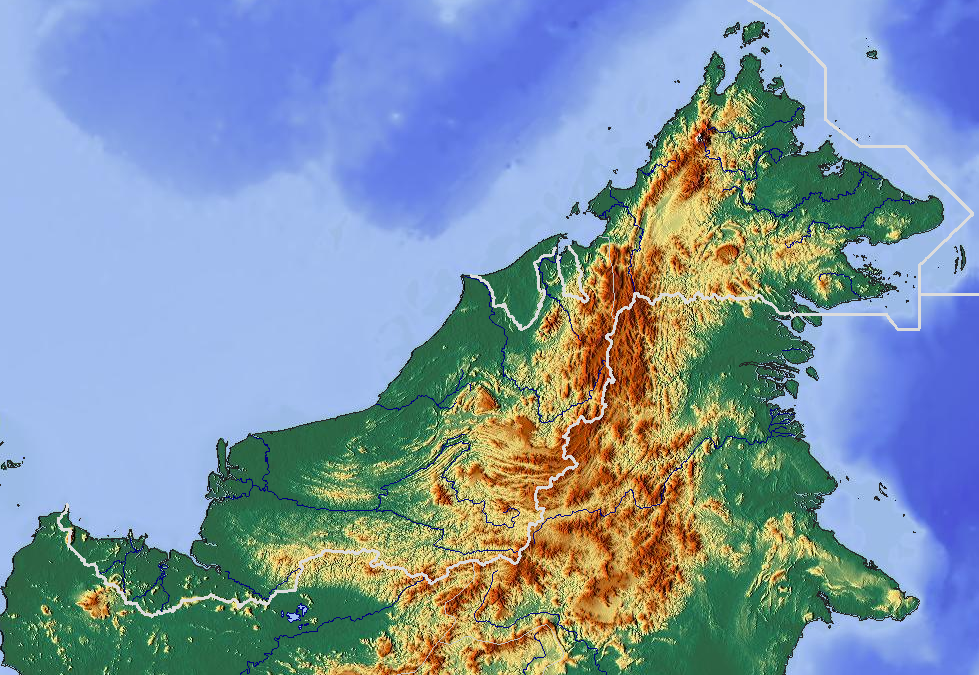
The topography of Malaysian Borneo.

Peninsular Malaysia covers the southern half of the Malay Peninsula, and extends 740 kilometres (460 mi) from north to south, and its maximum width is 322 kilometres (200 mi). It is mountainous, with more than half of it over 150 metres (492 ft) above sea level. About half of Peninsular Malaysia is covered by granite and other igneous rocks, a third more is covered by stratified rocks older than the granite, and the remainder is covered by alluvium.

Harbours are only available on the peninsula's western side, and the most fertile land occurs when river valleys flow out to the sea. The coastal plains bordering the Strait of Malacca are the most densely populated areas of Malaysia, and contains Malaysia's capital, Kuala Lumpur.

East Malaysia, on the island of Borneo, has a coastline of 2,607 kilometres (1,620 mi). It is divided between coastal regions, hills and valleys, and a mountainous interior. There are only two major cities, Kuching and Kota Kinabalu. Much of southern Sarawak is coastal lowlands, which shifts to a series of plateaus going north, ending in the mountainous regions of Sabah.

=== Mountain ranges ===
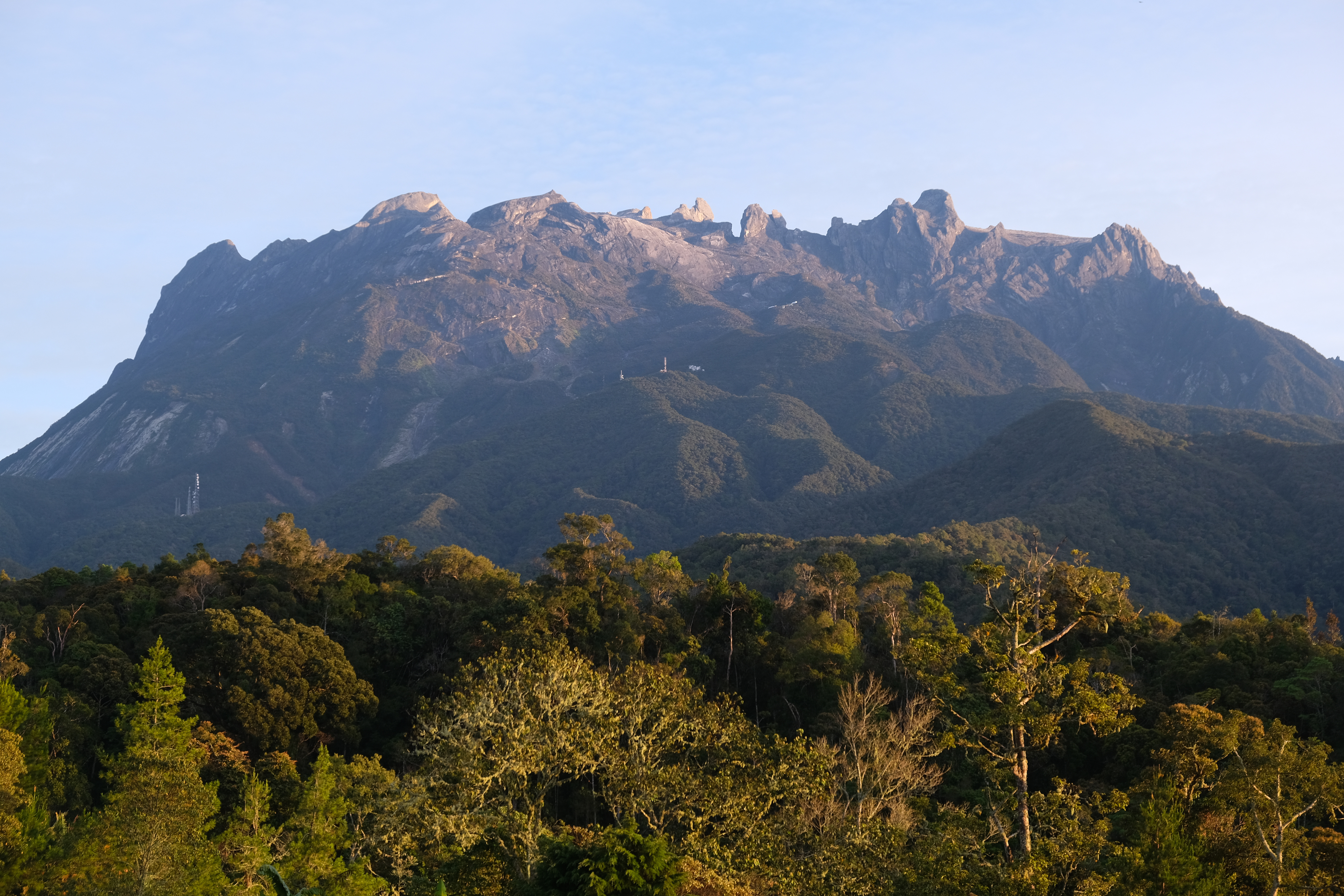
Mount Kinabalu, the highest point of Malaysia, is located in Sabah.

The highest mountain range in Malaysia is the Crocker Range in Sabah, which divides the state in half. This range includes Mount Kinabalu, the highest mountain in the country, as well as Mount Sinsing, the third highest in the country. Mount Kinabalu, is 4,095.2 metres (13,436 ft), and is protected as it is within Kinabalu Park, a UNESCO World Heritage Site and national park. Mount Kinabalu is 55% (by 1,453.2 metres (4,768 ft) margin) taller than Mount Trusmadi, Malaysia's second tallest mountain.

Mountain ranges in East Malaysia tend to follow north–south or northeast–southwest paths, and the highest ranges form the border between Malaysia and Indonesia. The mountains contain many jagged limestone peaks. The Trus Madi Range, also in Sabah, houses Mount Trus Madi. Bombalai Hill in Sabah is the only active volcano in Malaysia.

Peninsular Malaysia contains numerous mountain ranges running parallel from north to south along the peninsula. The main mountain range is the Titiwangsa Mountains, which divides the peninsula between its east and west coasts. It houses Mount Korbu, the second highest peak in Peninsular Malaysia. These mountains are heavily forested, and mainly composed of granite. The range is the origin of some of Peninsular Malaysia's river systems. To the east of this range is the Bintang Range. The highest peak in Peninsular Malaysia is Mount Tahan, located on the Tahan Range.

=== Caves ===
Numerous caves run through the country due to the karst landscape caused by water eroding limestone. The Mulu Caves in East Malaysia are the largest caves in the world. They are located between the Penambo range and Brunei, and are a major tourist attraction. At 700 metres (2,297 ft) long and 70 metres (230 ft) high the Sarawak Chamber is the largest cave chamber in the world. Other famous caves are the 1.6 kilometres (1 mi) Deer Cave and Lang's Cave.

=== Islands ===
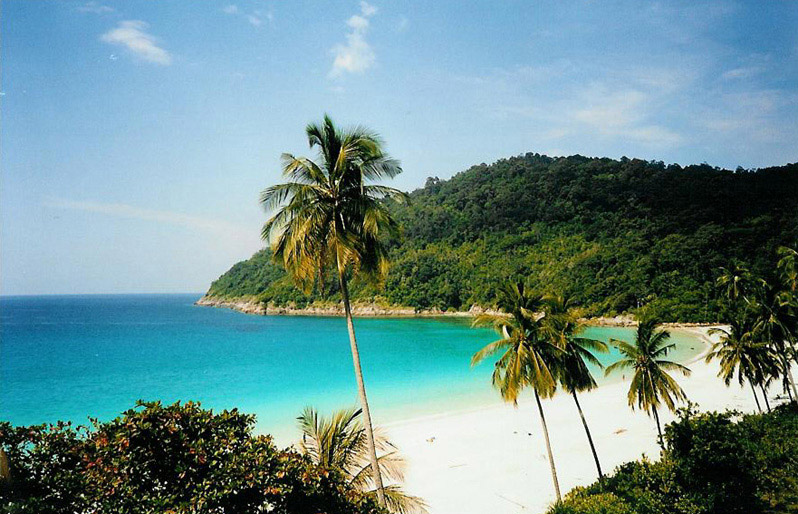
A beach on Redang Island in the South China Sea.

Malaysia contains numerous islands, the largest of which fully within Malaysia is Banggi Island in Sabah, which has an area of 440.7 square kilometres (170 sq mi). It is followed by Bruit Island in Sarawak, Langkawi in Kedah, and Penang Island in Penang. The largest island shared with another country is Borneo, followed by Sebatik Island. In addition, Malaysia lies within the world's coral reef distribution. The reefs can be usually found around islands such as Sipadan Island, Swallow Reef, and Redang Island. Sipadan, an underwater mountain, is Malaysia's only oceanic island.

=== Coasts ===
A recent global remote sensing analysis suggests that there were 1,713 km^{2} of tidal flats in Malaysia, making it the 19th ranked country in terms of how much tidal flat occurs there.

== Forests ==
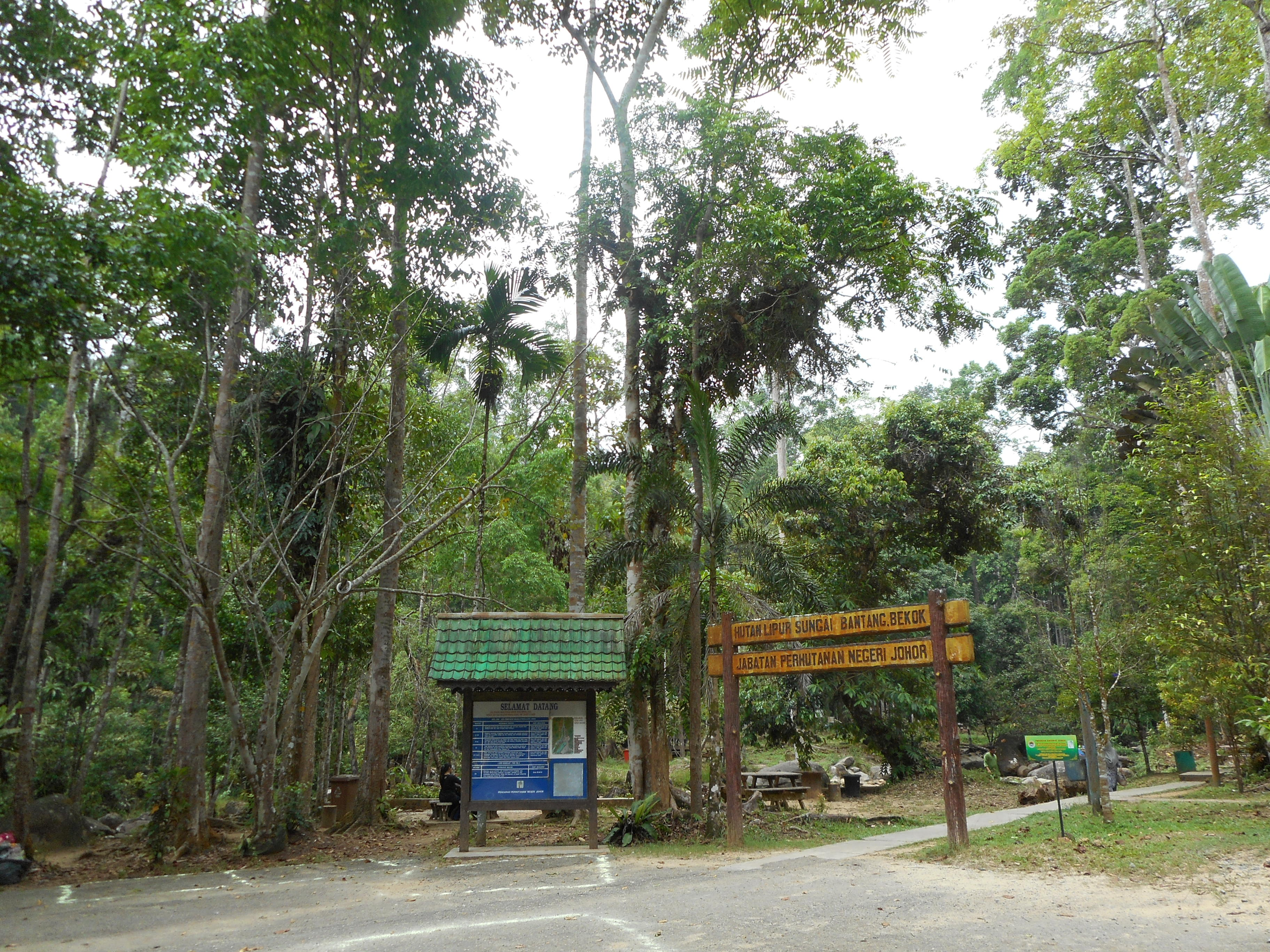
Bantang River Recreational Forest in Segamat District, Johor.

Malaysian forests can be categorised as tropical rainforests. Approximately 58.2% of Malaysia's land is covered by forest. A large amount of lowland forest is present below an altitude of 760 metres (2,493 ft). East Malaysia, like most of Borneo, was formerly covered by the Borneo lowland rain forests with over 2000 tree species. However, much of it has been cleared, due to the increase in logging since the 1960s and the increase of shifting cultivation. Over 80% of Sarawak's forests have been felled, and the logging throughout East Malaysia has polluted waterways, increased erosion, and damaged agriculture. Some state governments have now taken measures to halt the degradation of the rainforest.

Malaysia's rainforests are made of a variety of types, mainly dipterocarp, swamps, and mangroves. The majority of the forest is dipterocarp forests. Dipterocarps species are centred in Malaysia. There are over 1,425 square kilometres (550 sq mi) of mangroves in Malaysia. Some areas are designated as forest reserves, state parks, or national parks. The management of these reserves is done by the Department of Wildlife and National Park, the Forest Department of Sarawak, the Sabah Forestry Department, the Sabah Foundation, and Sabah Parks. As of 2000, there are two World Heritage Sites under the natural category – Kinabalu Park and Gunung Mulu National Park.

=== Ecoregions ===
Malaysia is divided into several tropical forest ecoregions.

Peninsular Malaysia is home to the Peninsular Malaysian rain forests, Peninsular Malaysian montane rain forests, Peninsular Malaysian peat swamp forests, and Tenasserim-South Thailand semi-evergreen rain forests.

Eastern Malaysia is home to the Borneo lowland rain forests, Borneo montane rain forests, Borneo peat swamp forests, Southwest Borneo freshwater swamp forests, and Sundaland heath forests.

Peninsular Malaysia's west coast is home to the Myanmar Coast mangroves. The Indochina mangroves fringe Peninsular Malaysia's east coast. The Sunda Shelf mangroves line Borneo's coast.

== Extreme points ==
The southernmost point of Malaysia is located in the district of Serian in Sarawak. Tanjung Piai on the southern tip of Johor is the southernmost point of the Malay Peninsula, and thus of the whole of continental Eurasia. The easternmost point is found on the tip of Dent Peninsula in Lahad Datu district in Sabah. The northernmost point is found on the northern tip of Banggi Island. The westernmost point is Perak Island, a sandstone rock which is part of Kedah state that rises at the center of the Strait of Malacca.

== Bodies of water ==
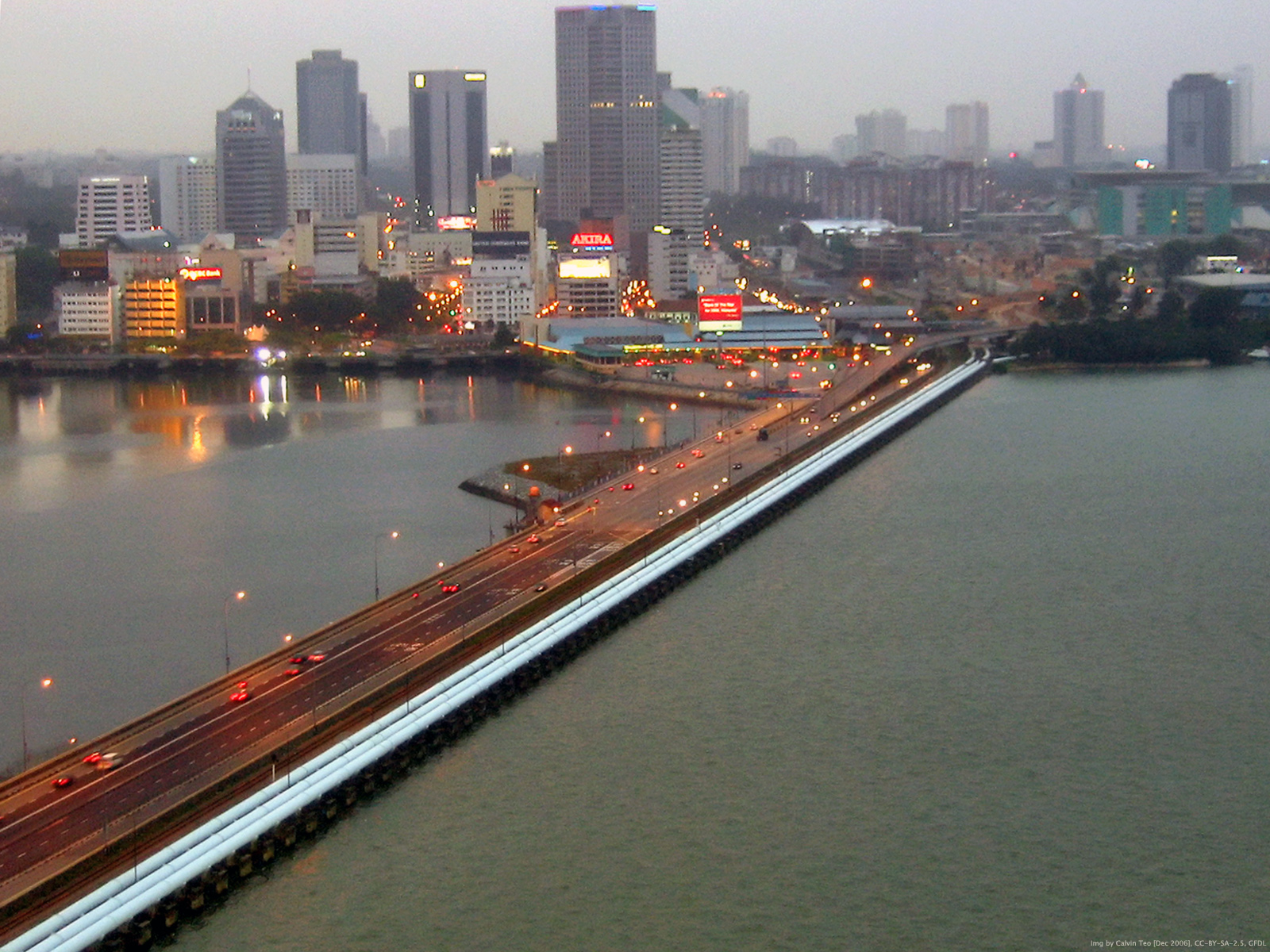
The 1056m Johor-Singapore Causeway connects Malaysia and Singapore across the Straits of Johor. In the background is Johor Bahru.

Between Peninsular Malaysia and East Malaysia is the South China Sea, the largest body of water around Malaysia. Facing the western coast of Peninsular Malaysia is the Strait of Malacca towards the south, and the Andaman Sea towards the north. The Strait of Malacca, lying between Sumatra and Peninsular Malaysia, is arguably the most important shipping lane in the world. These seas are marginal seas of the Indian Ocean.

Off the east coast of Peninsular Malaysia is the South China Sea, while a small part in the north lies within the Gulf of Thailand. These form part of the marginal seas of the Pacific Ocean. The Straits of Johor off the south of Peninsular Malaysia acts as the maritime border of Malaysia and Singapore. In East Malaysia, the western coasts of Sabah and Sarawak face the South China Sea. The northeast coast of Sabah faces the Sulu Sea, while the southeast coast of Sabah faces the Celebes Sea.

Malaysia claims 12 nm (22 kilometres (14 mi)) as its territorial waters, which extend into the Coral Triangle. It also has an exclusive economic zone of 334,671 km^{2} (129,217 mi^{2}) based on 200 metres (656 ft) nautical miles from its coastal baseline. Malaysia claims 200 metres (656 ft) in the depth of the continental shelf or to the depth of exploration within the area below the South China Sea known as Sundaland. The territorial claim for the Strait of Malacca is shared between Malaysia and Indonesia in accordance to a treaty signed in 1970 known as the Treaty Between the Republic of Indonesia and Malaysia on Determination of boundary Lines of Territorial Waters of the two Nations at the Strait of Malacca.

=== Lakes ===
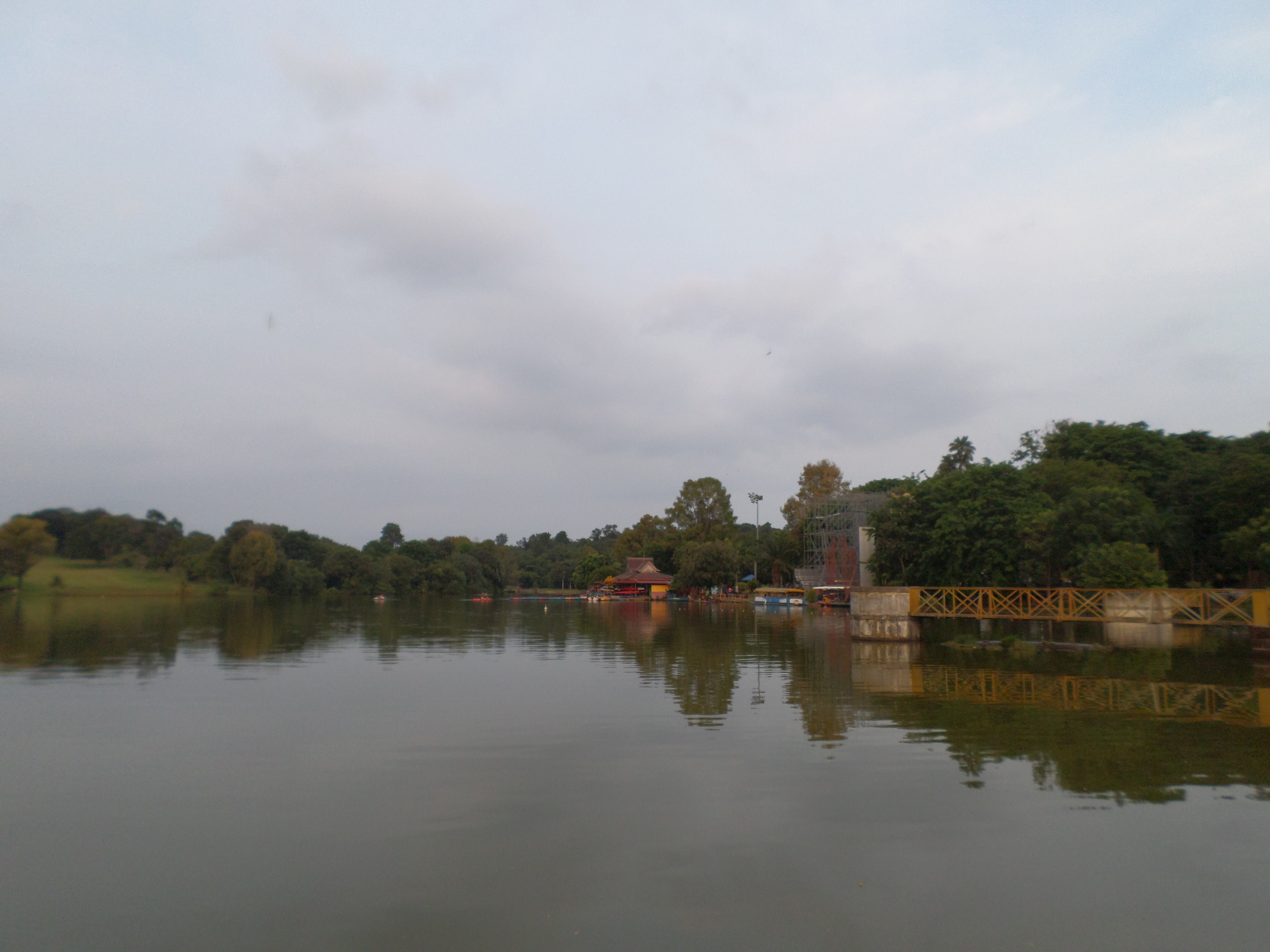
Ayer Keroh Lake.

The Bera Lake in Pahang is one of the largest lakes in Malaysia, and one of the only two natural lakes in Malaysia with Chini Lake. Pedu Lake is a 12 kilometres (7 mi) long lake located 5 kilometres (3 mi) from the Malaysia–Thailand border. Kenyir Lake is the largest artificial lake in Southeast Asia.

=== Rivers ===
There are many systems of rivers found around Malaysia. The longest is the Rajang River in Sarawak with a length of 760 kilometres (472 mi). The second longest is the Kinabatangan River in Sabah with a length of 560 kilometres (348 mi). The longest river in Peninsular Malaysia is the Pahang River with a length of 435 kilometres (270 mi).

== Wildlife ==
Malaysia is a megadiverse country, with a high number of species and high levels of endemism. These forests contain the Rafflesia, the world's largest flower. The clearing of the Borneo lowland rain forests has caused wildlife to retreat into the upland rain forests inland.

== Natural disasters ==
Malaysia's geographical location protects the country from most major natural disasters. It is located on a seismically stable plate that minimises direct risks of earthquakes and volcanoes, is partially protected from tsunamis by surrounding landmasses, and is a rare target for tropical cyclones. However, the country's tropical climate opens the country to the risk of flooding, landslides and prolonged droughts. Global climate change may exacerbate the situation with extreme weather events in Southeast Asia raising the economic, political and social risks for Malaysia.

=== Storms and flooding ===
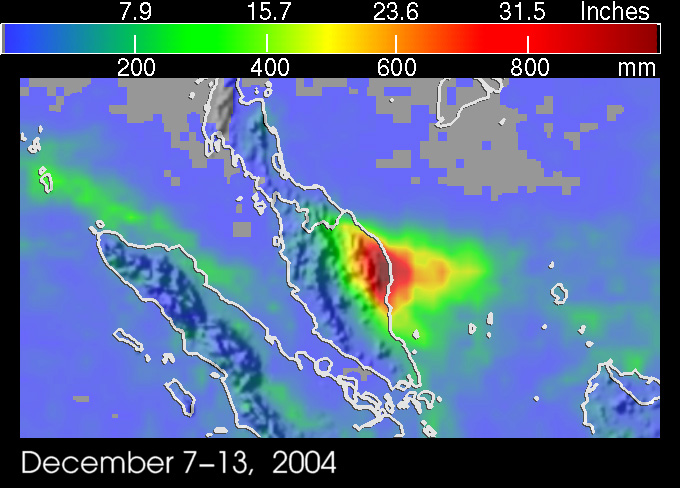
Peninsular Malaysia Precipitation Map in December 2004 showing heavy precipitation on the east coast, causing floods there.

With 189 water basins and an average rainfall of over 2,000–4,000 mm per year, Malaysia is prone to riverine, muddy floods that range from hours-long flash floods, to prolonged flooding on flat, low-lying land along major tributaries and main stems. 15 instances of major flooding in the region have occurred since 1926; notable floods include the 1971 floods in and around Kuala Lumpur that killed 32, affected 180,000 and prompted the launch of flood control projects in the city, 2006 and 2007 floods in Johor that resulted in 18 deaths and RM1.5 billion in damages in addition to the temporary displacement of 110,000 people, and major flooding centered around the Klang Valley in 2021–2022 that led to 54 deaths, at least RM5.3–6.5 billion in damages and left 125,490 displaced. Flooding has been a major concern in recent decades due to rapid development in river catchment areas that has led to increased surface and river runoffs, increased sediment buildup in rivers, and frequent erosion along river banks.

Due to weak Coriolis forces from its close proximity to the equator, direct passages of tropical cyclones are rare for the country despite its proximity to the highly active Northwestern Pacific tropical cyclone basin. The only tropical cyclones to significantly affect Malaysia since records began were Tropical Storm Greg in 1996, Tropical Storm Vamei in 2001, and Cyclone Senyar in 2025; Vamei's passage over Sabah remains the deadliest tropical storm in the country's history, with 238 dead and 102 missing. However, tropical depressions as well as outlying storm patterns generated by passing cyclones have made landfall regularly, often leading to abnormally high rainfall and flooding, such as the tail of Typhoon Lekima striking the Malay Peninsula in August 2018, and the path of 2021's Tropical Depression 29W across central Peninsular Malaysia contributing to record precipitation and protracted flooding in the region between December 2021 and January 2022.

=== Seismic activity ===
Malaysia is largely seismically stable with little modern history of volcanic activity, being situated entirely on the Sunda tectonic plate, between two major boundaries of the Australian Plate and Eurasian Plate in the west of Peninsular Malaysia, and the Philippine Sea Plate and Eurasian Plate at East Malaysia.

Peninsular Malaysia is more accustomed to only light tremors caused by earthquakes along the Sumatran islands of Indonesia generated predominantly by the Great Sumatran fault and Sunda megathrust. As is with Singapore, the effects of tremors are also felt more significantly on skyscrapers common in populated centres in Malaysia due to the effects of mechanical resonance. However, low intensity tremors within the Sunda plate have been documented to occur, such as a pair of rare earthquakes that did not originate in Sumatra felt in much of Malaya and Singapore on 31 January 1922 and 7 February 1922. East Malaysian states, particularly Sabah, are at risk of more moderate interplate and intraplate earthquakes due to its closer proximity to active tectonic activities along the Ring of Fire, with record earthquakes in the country occurring in Sabah in 1923, 1951, 1976 and 2015 at an average of 6.0–6.5 M_{w}. The fringes of Sabah also lay host to a series of the country's only volcanoes at the Tawau volcanic field and off the state's coast. Prominently, Mount Bombalai last erupted during the Holocene epoch, while the last major eruption in present-day Malaysia occurred during the formation of a chain of volcanic islands (prominently including Pulau Tiga) off Kimanis Bay in 1897.

Interest towards tsunami risks to Malaysia has also heightened since the 2004 Indian Ocean earthquake. Although the western coast of Peninsular Malaysia was largely shielded by Sumatra from the full effects of waves generated by the earthquake, weaker deflected tsunami waves led to damage and casualties along the northwestern coast of Peninsular Malaysia, affecting coastal Perlis, Kedah, Penang and Perak. The disaster also highlights the risk of further tsunamis that may strike coasts in direct line of undersea faults, primarily around the South China Sea.

== Natural resources ==
=== Minerals and petroleum ===
Malaysia produces petroleum and is a net exporter. Malaysia also produces liquefied natural gas as well as various other related products, most of which are found off the coasts of Terengganu, Sabah, and Sarawak. Other notable natural resources includes tin, timber, copper, iron, ore, and bauxite.

Malaysia was the largest exporter of tin until the industry-wide collapse in the 1980s. Tin deposits are found in areas in Selangor, Kinta valley in Perak, Pahang and Johor. There are significant deposit of gold in the Pahang towns of Raub and Kuala Lipis and also Kelantan's district of Gua Musang.

Coal is mostly concentrated in the Sarawak towns of Kapit, Mukah and Silantek.

=== Forestry ===
Timber can be found in the vast jungles in Malaysia, especially in East Malaysia. Malaysia's total exports of timber and other timber products amounted to MYR 23.4 billion in 2007.

=== Land use ===
Large areas of land are used as palm oil plantations, rubber plantations, and paddy fields. Malaysia is the world's largest exporter of palm oil producing 15.8 million tonnes of crude palm oil in 2007. Malaysia is also one of the largest producers and exporters of rubber and other rubber products.

As of 2011, the percentage arable land in Malaysia is 5.44%. Croplands consists of 17.49% while other land uses consists of 77.07%. As of 2009, irrigated land covers 3,800 km^{2}. Total renewable water resource total 580 cubic km as of 2011.

== Human geography ==
Peninsular Malaysia is more populated than East Malaysia with 79.2% of the population living in Peninsular Malaysia. In 2002, 59% of Malaysian population lived in urban areas, while the rest live in rural areas. The largest city is Kuala Lumpur with a population of 1.89 million people in the city, and about 7 million in the metropolitan area known as Klang Valley. Other major cities include George Town, Ipoh, Johor Bahru, Kuching, and Kota Kinabalu.

Largest cities and municipalities in Malaysia Department of Statistics, Malaysia (2020)
Rank	Name	State	Pop.	Rank	Name	State	Pop.
1	Kuala Lumpur	Federal Territory	1,982,112	11	Ipoh	Perak	759,952
2	Kajang	Selangor	1,047,356	12	Seremban	Negeri Sembilan	681,541
3	Seberang Perai	Penang	946,092	13	Iskandar Puteri	Johor	575,977
4	Subang Jaya	Selangor	902,086	14	Kuantan	Pahang	548,014
5	Klang	Selangor	902,025	15	Sungai Petani	Kedah	545,053
6	Johor Bahru	Johor	858,118	16	Ampang Jaya	Selangor	531,904
7	Shah Alam	Selangor	812,327	17	Kota Kinabalu	Sabah	500,425
8	George Town	Penang	794,313	18	Malacca City	Malacca	453,904
9	Petaling Jaya	Selangor	771,687	19	Sandakan	Sabah	439,050
10	Selayang	Selangor	764,327	20	Alor Setar	Kedah	423,868

== Political geography ==
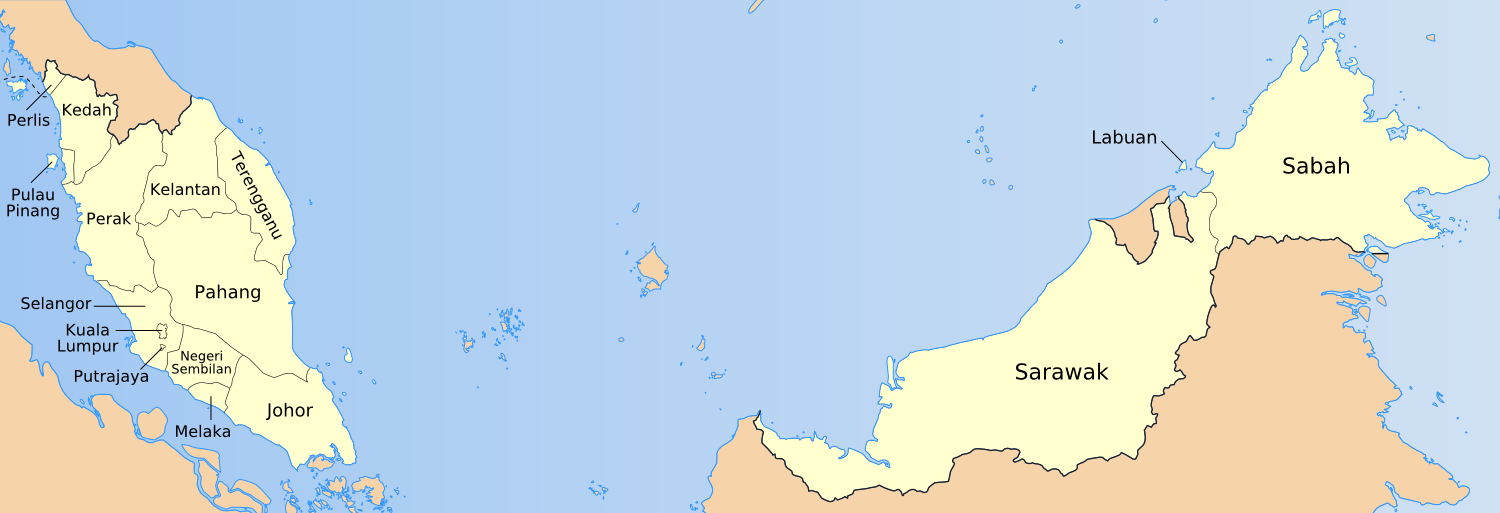
A Map of Malaysia's states.

Malaysia is divided into thirteen states and three Federal Territories. Eleven states and two Federal Territories are found in Peninsular Malaysia, while two states and one Federal Territory are found in East Malaysia. The states are further divided into administrative districts. In Sabah and Sarawak, they are first divided into divisions, then further divided into districts. There are separate subdivisions for electoral districts for polling purposes.

International borders between Malaysia and Indonesia, Thailand, Singapore and Brunei are defined mostly by geological features such as the Perlis River and Golok River between Malaysia and Thailand; Straits of Johor between Malaysia and Singapore; and Pagalayan Canal between Malaysia and Brunei. However, borders that extends to the seas are defined by agreements such as Straits Settlement and Johore Territorial Waters Agreement of 1927 which defines Malaysia and Singapore water borders.

=== Border disputes ===
Malaysia's land borders are well established. The border with Thailand was established in 1909 when Siam ceded Kedah, Kelantan, Perlis and Terengganu to the British. Maritime border disputes between Brunei and Malaysia and a Bruneian claim on Limbang, Sarawak were resolved in an exchange of letters between the two countries on 16 March 2009 after 20 years of negotiations.

Malaysia and Indonesia have some overlapping maritime claims, notably in the area around Sabah. An ongoing series of meetings to resolve these claims has produced 16 border agreements (to September 2010). Malaysia and Singapore also have disputes concerning some maritime borders.

The Philippines has a dormant claim to the eastern part of the Malaysian state of Sabah. Malaysia is also involved in a dispute involving Vietnam, Brunei, the People's Republic of China, the Philippines, and the Republic of China (Taiwan), concerning the Spratly Islands in the South China Sea.

== See also ==
- Environment of Malaysia
