= Syzygium ngadimanianum =

Conservation status
- Vulnerable (IUCN 2.3)

Scientific classification
- Kingdom: Plantae
- Clade: Tracheophytes
- Clade: Angiosperms
- Clade: Eudicots
- Clade: Rosids
- Order: Myrtales
- Family: Myrtaceae
- Genus: Syzygium
- Species: S. ngadimanianum

Binomial name
- Syzygium ngadimanianum (M.R.Hend.) I.M.Turner

Synonyms
- Eugenia ngadimaniana M.R.Hend.

Species of flowering plant

Syzygium ngadimanianum, synonym Eugenia ngadimaniana, is a species of flowering plant in the family Myrtaceae. It is a tree native to Peninsular Malaysia and Singapore. It grows in freshwater swamp forest and lowland rain forest. It is threatened by habitat loss. The IUCN Red List assesses the species as Vulnerable.
