= Syzygium taipingense =

Conservation status
- Endangered (IUCN 2.3)

Scientific classification
- Kingdom: Plantae
- Clade: Tracheophytes
- Clade: Angiosperms
- Clade: Eudicots
- Clade: Rosids
- Order: Myrtales
- Family: Myrtaceae
- Genus: Syzygium
- Species: S. taipingense

Binomial name
- Syzygium taipingense (M.R.Hend.) I.M.Turner

Synonyms
- Eugenia taipingensis M.R.Hend.

Species of flowering plant

Syzygium taipingense is a species of flowering plant in the family Myrtaceae. It is a tree endemic to Peninsular Malaysia. It is known only from Taiping in Perak state, where it grows in lowland rain forest. It is threatened by habitat loss from deforestation.

The species was first described as Eugenia taipingensis by Murray Ross Henderson in 1947. In 1997 Ian Mark Turner placed the species in genus Syzygium as S. taipingense.
