= Syzygium pseudoclaviflorum =

Conservation status
- Vulnerable (IUCN 2.3)

Scientific classification
- Kingdom: Plantae
- Clade: Tracheophytes
- Clade: Angiosperms
- Clade: Eudicots
- Clade: Rosids
- Order: Myrtales
- Family: Myrtaceae
- Genus: Syzygium
- Species: S. pseudoclaviflorum

Binomial name
- Syzygium pseudoclaviflorum (M.R.Hend.) I.M.Turner

Synonyms
- Eugenia pseudoclaviflora M.R.Hend.

Species of tree

Syzygium pseudoclaviflorum is a species of flowering plant in the family Myrtaceae. It is a tree endemic to Peninsular Malaysia. It is known only from a single collection on a track to Gunung Tahan in Taman Negara National Park, where it grows in lowland rain forest.

The species was first described as Eugenia pseudoclaviflora by M. R. Henderson in 1947. In 1997 Ian Mark Turner placed the species in genus Syzygium as S. pseudoclaviflorum.
