= Syzygium haniffii =

Conservation status
- Vulnerable (IUCN 2.3)

Scientific classification
- Kingdom: Plantae
- Clade: Tracheophytes
- Clade: Angiosperms
- Clade: Eudicots
- Clade: Rosids
- Order: Myrtales
- Family: Myrtaceae
- Genus: Syzygium
- Species: S. haniffii

Binomial name
- Syzygium haniffii (M.R.Hend.) I.M.Turner

Synonyms
- Eugenia haniffii M.R.Hend.

Species of tree

Syzygium haniffii, formerly known as Eugenia haniffii, is a species of flowering plant in the family Myrtaceae. It is a tree endemic to Peninsular Malaysia. It is known from the states of Penang and Selangor, where it grows scattered in hill rain forest from 300 to 450 metres elevation. It is threatened by habitat loss. The IUCN Red List assesses the species as Vulnerable.

The species was first described as Eugenia haniffii by M. R. Henderson in 1947. In 1997 Ian Mark Turner placed the species in genus Syzygium as S. haniffii.
