= Syzygium urophyllum =

Conservation status
- Vulnerable (IUCN 2.3)

Scientific classification
- Kingdom: Plantae
- Clade: Tracheophytes
- Clade: Angiosperms
- Clade: Eudicots
- Clade: Rosids
- Order: Myrtales
- Family: Myrtaceae
- Genus: Syzygium
- Species: S. urophyllum

Binomial name
- Syzygium urophyllum Merr.

Synonyms
- Eugenia caudata King; Eugenia filiformis var. parvifolia Craib; Syzygium enervosum Chantar. & J.Parn., nom. illeg.

Species of tree

Syzygium urophyllum is a species of flowering plant in the family Myrtaceae. It is a tree native to Peninsular Malaysia and Peninsular Thailand. It grows in hill and montane rain forests 600 to 1,500 metres elevation. It is threatened by habitat loss, and the IUCN Red List assesses the species as Vulnerable under the synonym Eugenia caudata.
