= Semporna (disambiguation) =

Semporna is a city in the Tawau Division of Sabah.

Semporna may also refer to:

- Semporna District
- Semporna Peninsula
- Semporna Airport
- Semporna (federal constituency)
