= Syzygium plumbeum =

Conservation status
- Vulnerable (IUCN 2.3)

Scientific classification
- Kingdom: Plantae
- Clade: Tracheophytes
- Clade: Angiosperms
- Clade: Eudicots
- Clade: Rosids
- Order: Myrtales
- Family: Myrtaceae
- Genus: Syzygium
- Species: S. plumbeum

Binomial name
- Syzygium plumbeum (King) I.M.Turner

Synonyms
- Eugenia plumbea King

Species of tree

Syzygium plumbeum is a species of flowering plant in the family Myrtaceae. It is a tree endemic to Peninsular Malaysia. It is known from a single collection at Gunung Batu Puteh in Perak, where it grows in submontane rain forest.
