= Semporna Peninsula =

Peninsula in Sabah, Malaysia

- Location of Semporna Peninsula in Sabah
- Location of Semporna Peninsula within Malaysia
- Etymology: Semenanjung Semporna

Geography
- Location: Tawau Division
- Coordinates: 4°32′21.32″N 118°00′53.88″E
- Archipelago: Maritime Southeast Asia
- Adjacent to: Celebes Sea
- Highest point: Mount Magdalena; 1,310 metres (4,298 ft)

Administration
- Malaysia
- State: Sabah

Demographics
- Population: More than 119 villages located in 49 dispersed islands around the peninsula

The Semporna Peninsula (Malay: Semenanjung Semporna) is a peninsula in Tawau Division, Sabah, Malaysia. It consists of coastal areas and numerous isolated hills and mountains rising to over 305 metres (1,001 ft). The Peninsula is also considered as a volcanic arc of the region with several volcanoes active during the Holocene period is located on the area.

== Geology ==
The formation of the peninsula involved process of intrusive and volcanic activity with the area consists of erosion surfaces within 100 metres (328 feet) of sea level, out of which rise hills of the more resistant rocks and upon which volcanic landforms have been superimposed. At the beginning of the Miocene period, much of the area was submerged and widespread volcanic activity of rhyolite with andesite and basalt types occurred during the period, followed by another three periods of activity. Early Pliocene gave intrusive hornblende diorite (particularly to eastern Timbun Mata), associated with volcanic breccia (eastern coast Sabah of Gaya and Boheydulang Islands and eastern Mount Pock).

Other features form during the similar period including volcanic agglomerate and breccia of Tinagat, Membalua and Tiku Hills; intrusive basic to intermediate dolerite on the flanks of Mount Andrassy, Mount Wullersdorf, and Mount Lucia; microdiorite, small hills north of Tawau; and diorite at Sangster and Forbes Hills in the Kalumpang Valley. In the Late Pliocene, andesitic lava and ash erupted from Magdalena-Lucia, Mount Andrassy, Mount Wullersdorf and Mount Pock, with these eruptions now forming the highest landform of the region. Rhyolite was later extruded from Mount Wullersdorf, Mount Andrassy and Glass Hill, and at the end of the Pliocene dacite was erupted from Mount Maria. The coastal platform was formed during the Quaternary period after series of eruptions of basaltic lavas. Basalt flows following eruptions from hills in the Table-Tiger area, Quoin Hill including in Mostyn caused much disruption of drainage and account for the upper alluvial valleys mentioned in the third region.

During the last ice age, the peninsula was connected by an isthmus to the island of Mindanao in the Philippines with the former isthmus included what is now the active volcanic island of Jolo, located at 6°00′39.09″N 121°01′55.45″E. In the peninsula also located the Skull Hill (Bukit Tengkorak) which consisted largely of numerous isolated hills and mountains, mostly being an extinct volcanoes from the era of Pliocene to Quaternary. Based on survey by Geological Department of Kota Kinabalu, the Skull Hill is said to be an island in its previous form but since the coral limestone terrace of the peninsula have risen from between 100 metres to 130 metres in the past 20,000 years, the hill are not island but a mountainous ridge near the coast. Through a survey on the geothermal presence in the peninsula, the area have a potential to develop geothermal energy as part of the Sabah's renewable energy. The narrow continental shelf fronting the coastal areas of both Dent and Semporna Peninsulas also could be exposed to future tsunamis with the active fault in the eastern coast.

== Climate and biodiversity ==
The climate of the peninsula is very hot and humid throughout the year with cloudy conditions and downpours occurring sometimes in the middle of April until the early month of May. The narrow coastal strip from Tawau to Semporna received mean annual rainfall ranging from 1,500 millimetres to 1,999 millimetres, with the annual rainfall varying from 2,000 millimetres to 2,500 millimetres which can be expected between November and February throughout the rainy season. Since the peninsula is covered with rainforest, the area is rich with medicinal plants species with a survey conducted by the Sabah Museum in 1998 found a total of 127 useful plant species plants which can be also used as materials for boat building, basket, mat weaving and other miscellaneous items. The most common species that can be found in the hinterland area are parashorea malaanonan (white seraya), shorea (red seraya) and dipterocarpus (keruing).

The coast of the Semporna Peninsula is identified as a hotspot of high marine biodiversity importance in the Coral Triangle.
