= 1976 Sabah earthquake =

Earthquake in Malaysia

- Location within Malaysia
- UTC time: 1976-07-26 02:56:38
- ISC event: 711657
- USGS-ANSS: ComCat
- Local date: 26 July 1976
- Local time: 10:56 MST (UTC+08:00)
- Magnitude: 6.3 (M_{w})
- Depth: 15 km (9.3 mi)
- Epicenter: 4.956°N 118.308°E
- Type: Normal
- Areas affected: Tawau Division & Sandakan Division, Sabah, East Malaysia
- Max. intensity: MMI IX (Violent)

The 1976 Sabah earthquake occurred near Lahad Datu in the eastern portion of Sabah, Malaysia at 10:56:39 (UTC+8) on 26 July 1976. The moment magnitude 6.3 earthquake is one of the strongest in Malaysia to be recorded by seismic instruments. It had a focal mechanism corresponding to strike-slip faulting. While slightly larger than the 2015 Sabah earthquake (M_{w} 6.0), the 1976 event caused less extensive damage, in the form of cracks on several buildings and ground cracks.

== See also ==
- List of earthquakes in 1976
- List of earthquakes in Malaysia
- Seismic activity of Malaysia
