= 2015 Sabah earthquake =

Earthquake in eastern Malaysia

- Location within Malaysia
- UTC time: 2015-06-04 23:15:43
- ISC event: 610635042
- USGS-ANSS: ComCat
- Local date: 5 June 2015
- Local time: 07:15:43 MST (UTC+08:00)
- Duration: 30 seconds
- Magnitude: 6.0 (M_{w}) (USGS) 5.9 (M_{w}) (MetMalaysia)
- Depth: 18.1 km (11.2 mi)
- Epicentre: 5.980°N 116.525°E
- Type: Dip-slip (normal)
- Areas affected: West Coast & Interior Division (Mount Kinabalu area), Sabah, East Malaysia
- Total damage: Building and infrastructure damage, landslides & geological changes, $2.84 billion (USD)
- Max. intensity: MMI VI (Strong)
- Landslides: Yes
- Aftershocks: 130 (As of 1 April 2016)
- Casualties: 18 deaths 11 wounded

The 2015 Sabah earthquake (Malay: Gempa Bumi Sabah 2015) struck Ranau, Sabah, Malaysia with a moment magnitude of 6.0 on 5 June, which lasted for 30 seconds. The earthquake was the strongest to affect Malaysia since the 1976 Sabah earthquake.

Tremors were also felt in Tambunan, Tuaran, Kota Kinabalu, Inanam, Kota Belud, Kota Marudu, Kudat, Likas, Penampang, Putatan, Kinarut, Papar, Beaufort, Keningau, Beluran, Sandakan, Kunak, Tawau in Sabah and as far afield as Federal Territory of Labuan, Lawas, Limbang and Miri in Sarawak as well as Bandar Seri Begawan in Brunei.

Eighteen fatalities were reported, all occurring on Mount Kinabalu, including ten Singaporeans, six Malaysians, and two from both China and Japan. About 137 climbers were stranded on the mountain but were subsequently rescued.

As a result of the earthquake, most areas in the Kinabalu Park have been closed temporarily until the situation is cleared and undergoing repairs and rehabilitation.

== Tectonic setting ==
Sabah lies within the Sunda plate away from any plate boundaries. It was the location of a convergent plate boundary until some time during the Early Miocene. Since then Sabah has been massively uplifted, with the Kinabalu Granite, which was emplaced during the early Late Miocene (between 7.8 and 7.2 million years ago), being exhumed at a rate of 7 mm per year during Late Miocene–Early Pliocene (~ 8–3 Ma ago). the region continues to rise at a long term rate of about 0.5 mm each year. The uplift is thought to be a result of either break-off of the subducted slab or delamination of the lithosphere. Despite not being at a plate boundary, GPS measurements show that the coastal part of Sabah is moving towards the north-west. The uplift is thought to be driving gravitational collapse with sliding of the northwestern part of Sabah being accommodated by extension. This is consistent with the focal mechanism of earlier earthquakes in the onshore area.

== Earthquake ==
The earthquake occurred on 5 June 2015 at 07:15 a.m. MST (23:15:43 UTC) at a depth of approximately 18.1 km (11.2 mi), with its epicentre approximately 15 km (9.3 mi) north of Ranau and lasting for thirty seconds. The earthquake was initially reported as 6.0 M_{w} by the United States Geological Survey (USGS) while the Malaysian Meteorological Department (MetMalaysia) reported the earthquake's magnitude to be 5.9 M_{s}.

=== Cause ===
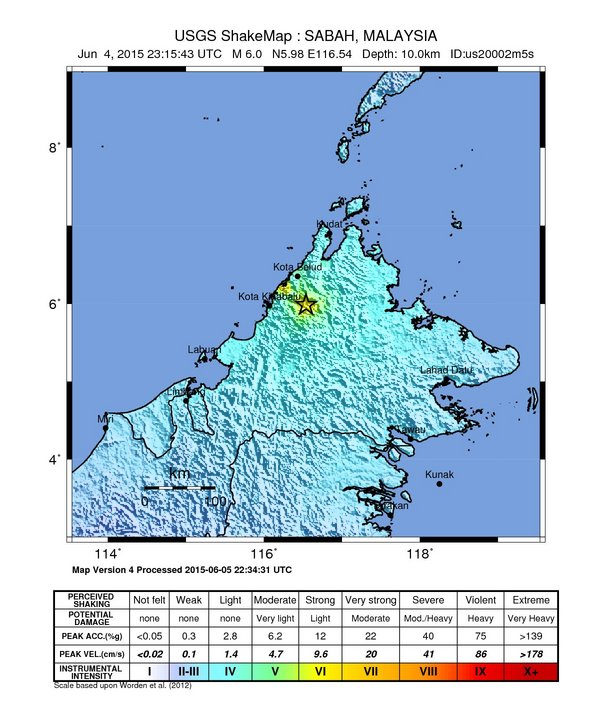
USGS ShakeMap for the event

The earthquake was caused by movement on a SW-NE trending normal fault. As the epicentre of the earthquake was near to Mount Kinabalu, the shaking caused massive landslides around the mountain.

==== Local native beliefs ====
According to the claims of local natives, the earthquake was caused by aki (the mountain protectors) who were angered over the acts of ten western tourists (comprising six men and four women from Canada, Germany, the Netherlands and the United Kingdom) who "stripped and urinated at the mountain (which is believed by local natives as a sacred place) on 30 May", six days before the earthquake happened. The tourists also shouted vulgarities when they were told to desist by their mountain guide. The acts provoked outrage among Sabahan natives who wanted the alleged offenders charged in native court and forced to pay the sogit, a type of compensation, given in the form of money or livestock, to appease the aggrieved party according to local Kadazan-Dusun native customs. However, the detained tourists were released from prison and escaped native court, and so the local villagers performed their own rituals. The misconduct was condemned by the Science Adviser to the Malaysian Prime Minister who said:

Science has no answer to that (the sacred mountain). If the mountain is sacred, we have to respect that. It is part of the traditional and local knowledge that are increasingly recognised by the international community.

The brother of one of the deceased mountain guides also criticised the behaviour of the tourists, saying:

It is not about laws or superstition, but about having mutual respect among human beings. As a Christian, I too do not believe in superstition, but I adhere to the advice and beliefs of the elders out of respect. It is part of being humans, we don't do things that will offend our fellow-human beings whether they are Muslims, Christian or Animists. This is something we taught here, but I guess a person like him (one of the bad nudists) doesn't have this in him.

Following the incident, some of the tourists and their family members have expressed their apologies to all involved parties with the United Kingdom government beginning to review their travelling advice to Malaysia.

=== Aftershocks ===
In the immediate aftermath of the earthquake that evening, three aftershocks occurred, with the first and second at 21:10 MST and 23:13 MST respectively, each measuring 4.3 magnitude, while a third at 23:32 MST was 2.8 M_{w}. By 23 June 90 aftershocks had been reported at Ranau by the Malaysian Meteorological Department, ranging in magnitudes from 1.6 to 5.2.

=== Casualties ===
Casualties by country
| Country | Deaths | Ref. |
|---|---|---|
| Singapore (Note: Including: 1 Filipino-Singaporean.) | 10 | |
| Malaysia | 6 | |
| China | 1 | |
| Japan | 1 | |
| Total | 18 | |

187 climbers were impacted, according to Sabah official sources, with most of them from Malaysia and Singapore, and others from Australia, Belgium, Canada, China, Denmark, France, Germany, India, Ireland, Japan, Kazakhstan, Netherlands, New Zealand, the Philippines, South Korea, Thailand, Turkey, United Kingdom and the United States. 137 of them were stranded but subsequently rescued.

The majority of fatalities were teachers and students from a Singaporean climbing group from the Tanjong Katong Primary School; initially reportedly missing, the Singaporeans were later officially confirmed dead by the Singaporean Ministry of Education with an official statement released on 10 June. Malaysian nationals accounted for the second most number of deaths, including two climbers (revised downwards from three initially reported missing) and four mountain guides. Subsequent investigation and witness by other climbers found that the four mountain guides died while protecting climbers. The four guides were identified as Robbi Sapinggi, Valerian Joannes, Ricky Masirin and Joseph Solungin. A Japanese climber also died while protecting one of the Singaporean school students as revealed by the owner of the accommodation where the climber stayed.

=== Damage ===
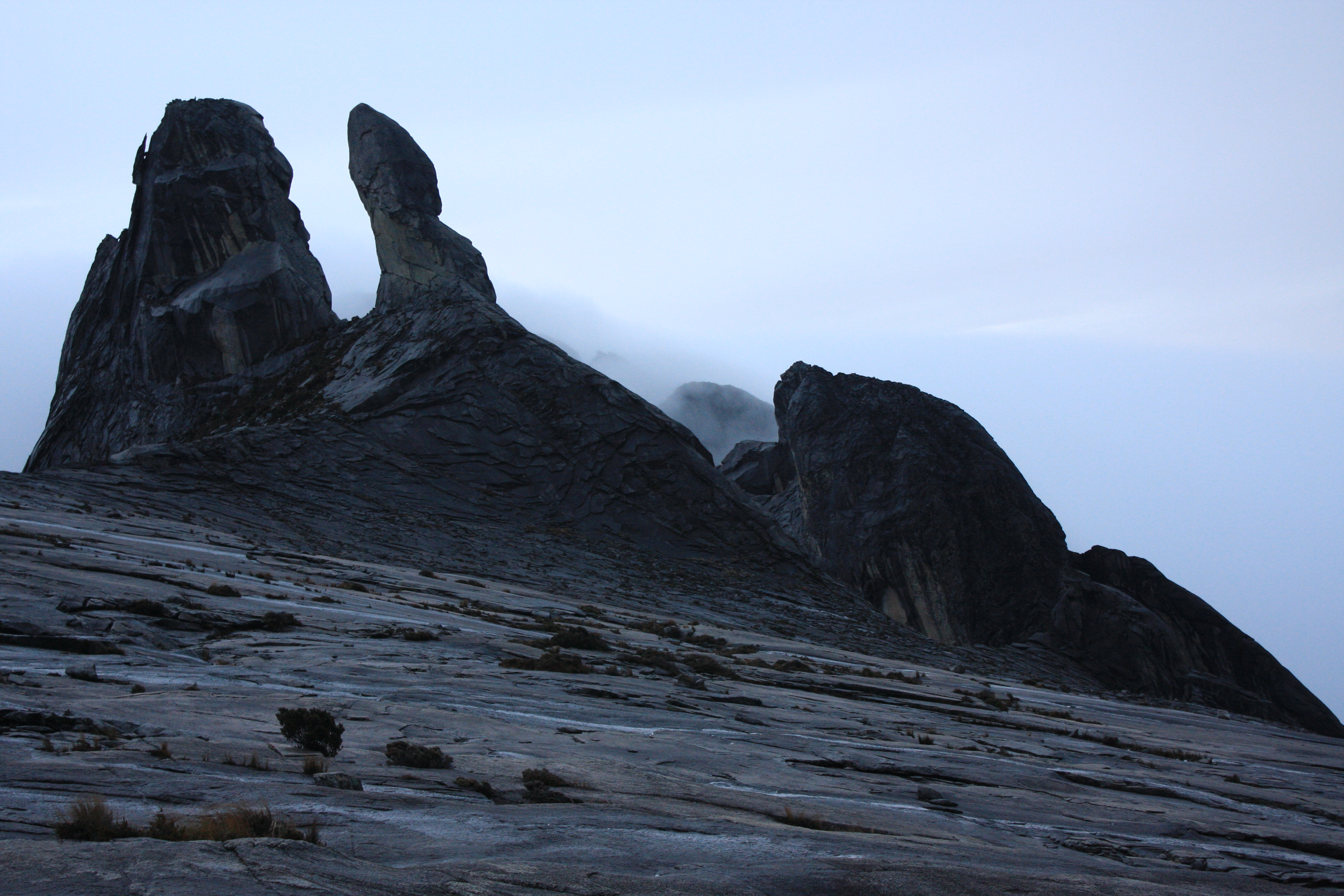
Donkey's Ears Peak, pictured in 2012. One of the prominences collapsed due to the earthquake.

During the earthquake, one of the peaks on Mount Kinabalu (called the Donkey's Ears) was broken off. The source of the Poring Hot Springs, a popular tourist area near Ranau, turned murky and black for a few hours due to the earthquake, which disrupted a clay deposit that interrupts the fault gap that heats up the rainwater. Some infrastructure was reported damaged with around 23 schools in six different districts affected, and Ranau Mosque was also damaged due to the tremor.

Serious damage occurred to the hostels and resthouse near the summit of Mount Kinabalu. Buildings were similarly affected by the earthquake in Kota Belud and Tuaran. The areas around Kundasang and Ranau suffered water supply disruption when the main water drainage pipe burst, and several plants in both regions were damaged with a leakage in the deposition tank.

== Response ==
Sabah local mountain guides became the first rescuers during the situation, as reported by an Australian climber. Government agencies like the Fire and Rescue Department, Royal Malaysia Police and Malaysian Armed Forces provided equipment during the rescue missions as was reported by the mountain guides. Queen Elizabeth Hospital in Kota Kinabalu was turned into a disaster centre. The National Security Council (NSC) dispatched 25 members of the Special Malaysia Disaster Assistance and Rescue Team (SMART) – paramedics, engineers and rescuers.

Prime Minister Najib Razak ordered efforts to rescue victims stuck on Mount Kinabalu, with the army troops put on standby, as well as a 24-hour helpline being opened. Deputy Prime Minister Muhyiddin Yassin ordered the NSC to introduce an early warning system for earthquakes including for school buildings as well the setting up of a seismic centre to monitor earthquake activities in the state.

Sabah State Government together with the Federal Government donated MYR5,000 (U$1,000+) each for Malaysians who died on the quake while MYR2,000 (U$300+) for injured victims. The Pan-Malaysian Islamic Party (PAS) has launched an impromptu donation drive for victims of the Sabah earthquake at the party's muktamar on 5 June and raised a total of MYR19,800 (around U$5,000+) from delegates. The Barisan Nasional Women's Wing together with the Sabah Community Services Council has also launched a fund, starting with MYR20,000 (US$5,300). The Malaysian Chinese Association (MCA) Sabah branch donated a total of MYR50,000 (US$13,558). An amount of MYR10,000 (US$2,711) also being raised by Democratic Action Party (DAP) Sabah branch to the Kinabalu Mountain Guide Association with another MYR10,000 are given to each family of the four mountain guides who perished during the earthquake.

AirAsia has collaborating with the Malaysia Volunteer Fire and Rescue Association (MVFRA) to transport relief items to Sabah. The Malaysian Communications and Multimedia Commission (MCMC) together with local telecommunications companies have started a public fund. The Malaysian Islamic Development Department (JAKIM) has hold a special prayers for the well-being of the people in Sabah and that the earthquake tragedy does not recur. While the Sarawak State Government and Johor Sultan Ibrahim has donated a total MYR1 million (around US$200,000+) respectively.

Apart from funds and donations granted by government bodies and big corporations, soon after the heroic Robbi Sapinggi was identified as one of the first two victims on the very first day of the earthquake, Robbi's employer, Amazing Borneo, started a crowdfunding campaign on Indiegogo to let people donate to his family especially his newlywed wife and six-month-old son. Many people responded to the campaign to honour his sacrifice and act of bravery.

The Taiwanese Tzu Chi Foundation in Malaysia through its volunteers in Kota Kinabalu conducted a survey to the earthquake site on 6 June for a disaster survey and visiting currently warded victims in local hospital to providing support with the volunteers also accompanied family members of seven victims and handed out cash relief to each of the family.

=== International reactions ===
- Brunei – Sultan Hassanal Bolkiah has extended his condolences to the Malaysian and Singaporean Prime Ministers.
- East Timor – The Government of Timor-Leste offers its condolences to near neighbours Malaysia and Singapore after the loss of life caused by the earthquake and said the nation stands in solidarity with all those affected by the tragedy. Spokesperson for the Government of Timor-Leste, Minister of State Agio Pereira noted, "our thoughts are with all those grieving, particularly those families who have lost their children in this disaster".
- Malaysia – The Malaysian Government has extended its profound sympathy and deepest condolences to the families of Sabah's quake victims, including foreign nationals. On 6 June, the State Government of Sabah has announced that 8 June will be declared a day of mourning for Sabah where the flag will be flown at half-mast.
- Singapore – Prime Minister Lee Hsien Loong hoped for the best on the fate of the missing schoolchildren and their teachers following the earthquake. The Singaporean Ministry of Foreign Affairs (MFA) Crisis Response Team was quickly dispatched to Sabah. Singaporean Ministry of Communications and Information Dr Yaacob Ibrahim expressed his sympathy over the quake; "My thoughts are with the people in Sabah, Malaysia". On 7 June, Prime Minister Lee offered his deepest condolences to all victims and thanked all the Malaysian authorities, the search and rescue teams and hospital staff in Kota Kinabalu, as well as Singaporean officers in the city and Singapore for their efforts. The Singaporean Government declared that 8 June be a national remembrance day with the Singaporean flag being flown at half-mast and a minute of silence being observed at the beginning of all 2015 SEA Games venues.

== Memorials ==
On 5 June 2016, a monument in the form of brass plaque etched with the names of the 18 victims was erected near the base of Mount Kinabalu.

== See also ==
- List of earthquakes in 2015
- List of earthquakes in Malaysia
- Seismic activity of Malaysia
