= List of volcanoes in Malaysia =

Name	Elevation		Location	Last eruption
Name	metres	feet	Coordinates	Last eruption
Bombalai	531	1742	Sabah (4°23′41″N 117°52′35″E)	Holocene
Lucia	1201	3940	Sabah (4°28′12″N 117°56′21.84″E)	Holocene
Magdalena	1310	4298	Sabah (4°29′26.88″N 117°57′47.88″E)	Holocene
Maria	1020	3346	Sabah (4°26′6″N 117°57′9″E)	Holocene
Si Amil Island	n/a	n/a	Sabah (4°18′50″N 118°52′18″E)	n/a
Bodgaya Island	n/a	n/a	Sabah (4°37′35.1″N 118°45′28.2″E)	n/a
Pulau Tiga	n/a	n/a	Sabah (5°43′19″N 115°38′59″E)	1897

There are several volcanoes in the territory of Malaysia, mostly located in the state of Sabah.

== See also ==
- List of mountains in Malaysia
