= List of earthquakes in Malaysia =

This is a list of earthquakes in Malaysia:

== Earthquakes ==
Date (UTC)	Location	Mag.	MMI	Deaths	Injuries	Comments
1922-01-31	Johor	5.4				Scale M_{I}. Magnitude derived from shaking intensity distribution. Minor damage.
1922-02-07	Johor	5.0				Scale M_{I}. Magnitude derived from shaking intensity distribution. Minor damage.
1923-08-11	Lahad Datu District, Sabah	6.6				Scale M_{w}. No damage.
1936-09-19	Aceh Province, Indonesia	7.1				M_{w}. Roof tiles detached at Teluk Intan. Some buildings cracked in Georgetown, Kuala Lumpur, and Sitiawan.
1951-06-02	Kudat District, Sabah	6.1	VII			
1976-07-26	Kudat District, Sabah	6.3				Scale M_{w}. Minor damage
1991-05-26	Ranau District, Sabah	5.1	V	1		Doublet, localized damage.
1991-05-26	Ranau District, Sabah	5.4	VII			Doublet, localized damage.
2002-11-02	Simeulue, Indonesia	7.2	V	-		Scale M_{w}. Minor damage to buildings in Penang and Port Klang. Strongly felt by people in high-rise buildings, causing public panic. Three people dead, 65 injured and 994 buildings damaged on Simeulue, Indonesia.
2004-12-26	Aceh Province, Indonesia	9.3		68		Scale M_{w}. Deaths attributed to the tsunami in Penang, Langkawi and Kedah. See also: Effect of the 2004 Indian Ocean earthquake on Malaysia
2005-02-05	Celebes Sea	7.1	III	2		No damage
2007-11-30–2008-05-25	Bukit Tinggi, Selangor–Pahang border	1.7–3.7	-	-	-	Mildly felt and no damage. Twenty three earthquakes ranging from M_{w} 1.7 to 3.7. Strike-slip earthquakes along reactivated portions of the 120 km (75 mi)-long Bukit Tinggi Fault.
2015-06-04	Ranau District, Sabah	6.0	VI	18	11	Serious damage
2022-02-25	West Sumatra, Indonesia	6.2	III	0	0	In Port Dickson, light damage to a private hospital and government building. At least 19 killed and 425 injured in Indonesia.
2025-08-23	Segamat, Johor	4.0	V	0	0	The ceiling of a mosque collapsed and three structures damaged in the Segamat area.
2026-02-22	Kota Belud, Sabah	7.1	V			Scale M_{w}. Largest ever recorded in Malaysia.
Note: Only damaging, injurious, or deadly events should be recorded.
