= Malay Peninsula =

Peninsula in Southeast Asia

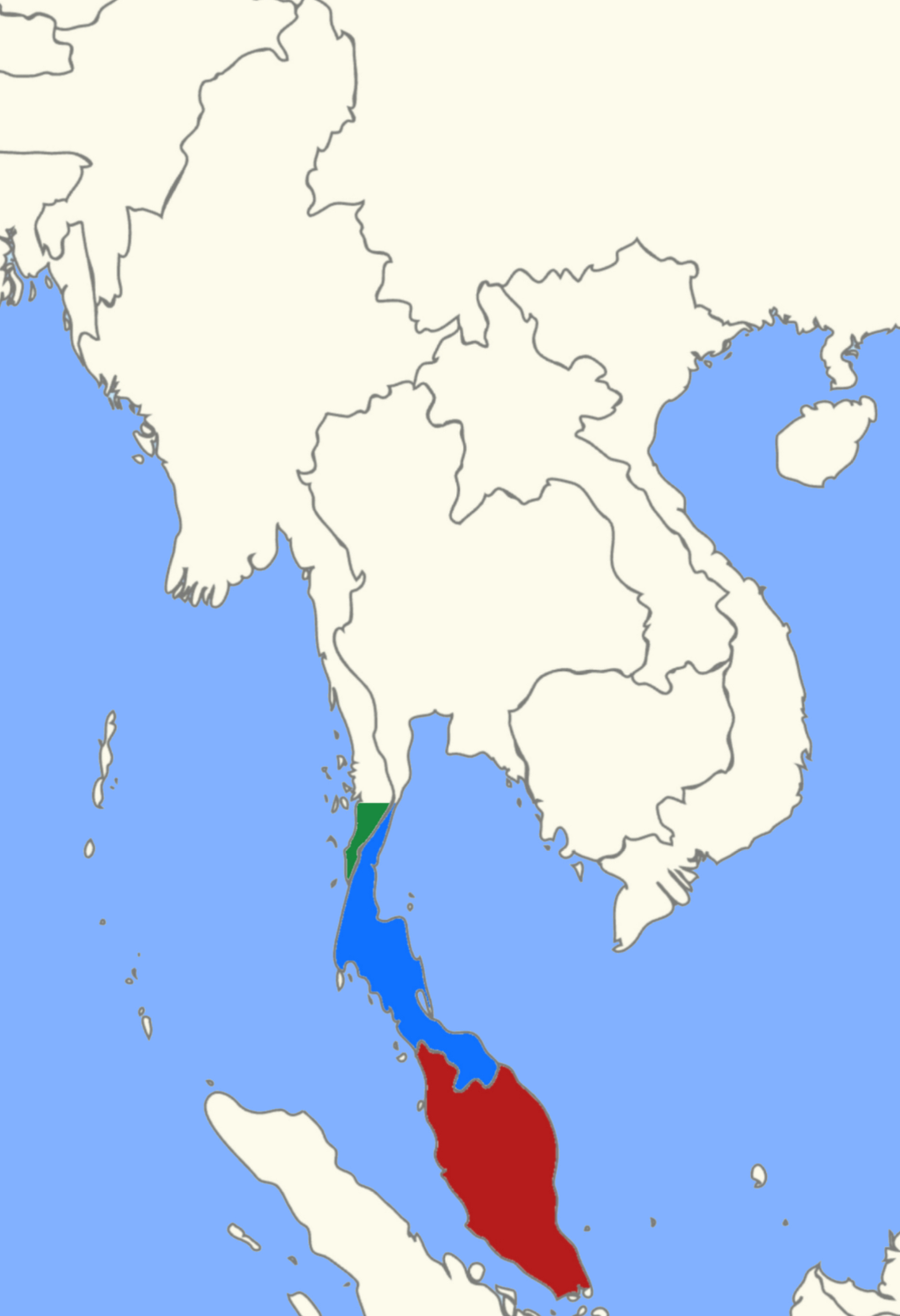
- Location of the Malay Peninsula: Southernmost tip of Myanmar; Southern Thailand; Peninsular Malaysia

Geography
- Location: Southeast Asia
- Coordinates: 7°00′N 100°00′E
- Adjacent to: Indian Ocean, Pacific Ocean
- Area: 242,363.8 km^{2} (93,577.2 sq mi)
- Highest elevation: 2,187 m (7175 ft)
- Highest point: Mount Tahan

Administration
- Malaysia
- Peninsular Malaysia
- Largest settlement: Kuala Lumpur
- Myanmar
- Region: Tanintharyi
- District: Kawthaung
- Largest settlement: Kawthaung
- Thailand
- Southern Thailand
- Largest settlement: Hat Yai

The Malay Peninsula (Note: Malay: Semenanjung Tanah Melayu or Semenanjung Melayu) is located in Mainland Southeast Asia. The landmass runs approximately north–south, and at its terminus, Tanjung Piai, it is the southernmost point of the Asian continental mainland. The area contains Peninsular Malaysia, Southern Thailand, and the southernmost tip of Myanmar (Kawthaung). The island country of Singapore also has historical and cultural ties with the region.

The Titiwangsa Mountains are part of the Tenasserim Hills system and form the backbone of the peninsula and the southernmost section of the central cordillera, which runs from Tibet through the Kra Isthmus, the peninsula's narrowest point, into the Malay Peninsula. The Strait of Malacca separates the Malay Peninsula from the Indonesian island of Sumatra, and the south coast is separated from the island of Singapore by the Straits of Johor.

== Etymology ==
The Malay term Tanah Melayu is derived from the word Tanah (land) and Melayu (Malays), thus it means "the Malay land". The term can be found in various Malay texts, of which the oldest dating back to the early 17th century. It is frequently mentioned in the Hikayat Hang Tuah, a well-known classic tale associated with the legendary heroes of Malacca Sultanate. Tanah Melayu in the text is consistently employed to refer to the area under Malaccan dominance. In the Negarakertagama manuscript written in 1365, this area is called Hujung Medini.

In the early 16th century, Tomé Pires, a Portuguese apothecary who stayed in Malacca from 1512 to 1515, uses an almost identical term, Terra de Tana Malaio, with which he referred to the southeastern part of Sumatra, where the deposed sultan of Malacca, Mahmud Shah, established his exiled government. The 17th century's account of Portuguese historian, Emanuel Godinho de Erédia, noted on the region of Malaios surrounded by the Andaman Sea in the north, the entire Strait of Malacca in the centre, a part of Sunda Strait in the south, and the western part of South China Sea in the east.

Prior to the foundation of Malacca, ancient and medieval references to a Malay peninsula exist in various foreign sources. According to several Indian and Western scholars, the word Malayadvipa ("mountain-insular continent"), mentioned in the ancient Indian text, Vayu Purana, may possibly refer to the Malay Peninsula. Another Indian source, an inscription on the south wall of the Brihadeeswarar Temple, recorded the word Malaiur, referring to a kingdom in the Malay Peninsula that had "a strong mountain for its rampart". Ptolemy's Geographia named a geographical region of the Golden Chersonese as Maleu-kolon, a term thought to derive from Sanskrit malayakolam or malaikurram. Tabula Rogeriana completed by an Arab geographer Muhammad al-Idrisi, reflects the Malay peninsula as a long island and called it Malai, bordering the Qmer (Khmer) and lying 12 days sail from Sanf (Champa). While the Chinese chronicle of the Yuan dynasty mentioned the word Ma-li-yu-er, referring to a nation of the Malay Peninsula that was threatened by the southward expansion of the Sukhothai Kingdom under King Ram Khamhaeng. During the same era, Marco Polo made a reference to Malauir in his travelogue, as a kingdom located in the Malay Peninsula, possibly similar to the one mentioned in the Yuan chronicle. The Malay Peninsula was conflated with Persia in old Japan, and was known by the same name.

In the early 20th century, the term Tanah Melayu was generally used by the Malays of the peninsula during the rise of Malay nationalism to describe uniting all Malay states on the peninsula under one Malay nation, and this ambition was largely realised with the formation of Persekutuan Tanah Melayu (Malay for "Federation of Malaya") in 1948.

== Ecology ==
The Malay Peninsula is covered with tropical moist broadleaf forests. Lowland forests are dominated by dipterocarp trees, while montane forests are home to evergreen trees in the beech family (Fagaceae), Myrtle family (Myrtaceae), laurel family (Lauraceae), tropical conifers, and other plant families.

The peninsula's forests are home to thousands of species of animals and plants. Several large endangered mammals inhabit the peninsula – Asian elephant (Elephas maximus), gaur (Bos gaurus), tiger (Panthera tigris), sun bear (Helarctos malayanus), Malayan tapir (Tapirus indicus), clouded leopard (Neofelis nebulosa), and siamang (Symphalangus syndactylus). The Sumatran rhinoceros (Dicerorhinus sumatrensis) once inhabited the forests, but Malaysia's last rhinoceroses died in 2019, and the species' few remaining members survive only in Sumatra.

The peninsula is home to several distinct ecoregions. The Tenasserim–South Thailand semi-evergreen rain forests cover the northern peninsula, including the Tenasserim Hills and the Isthmus of Kra, and extend to the coast on both sides of the isthmus.

The Kangar-Pattani floristic boundary crosses the peninsula in southern Thailand and northernmost Malaysia, marking the boundary between the large biogeographic regions of Indochina to the north and Sundaland and Malesia to the south. The forests north of the boundary are characterized by seasonally-deciduous trees, while the Sundaland forests have more year-round rainfall and the trees are mostly evergreen. Peninsular Malaysia is home to three terrestrial ecoregions. The Peninsular Malaysian montane rain forests ecoregion covers the mountains above 1,000 meters elevation. The lowlands and hills are in the Peninsular Malaysian rain forests ecoregion. The Peninsular Malaysian peat swamp forests include distinctive waterlogged forests in the lowlands on both sides of the peninsula.

Extensive mangroves line both coasts. The Myanmar Coast mangroves are on the western shore of the peninsula, and the Indochina mangroves on the eastern shore.

== List of areas by country ==
=== Malaysia ===
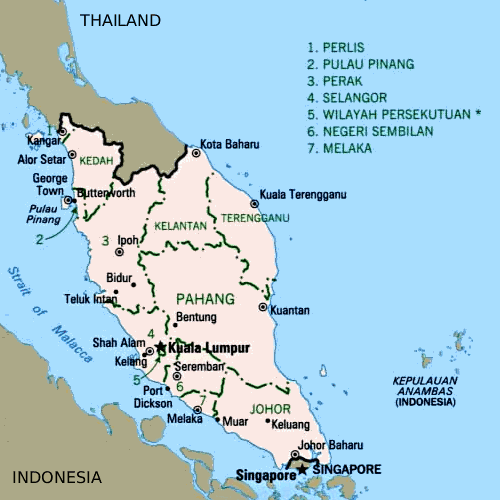
Map of Peninsular Malaysia

Flag	Emblem / Achievement	State	Capital	Royal Capital	Area (km^{2})	Head of State	Head of Government
Flag of Johor	Coat of arms of Johor	Johor	Johor Bahru	Muar	19,166	Sultan	Menteri Besar
Flag of Kedah	Coat of arms of Kedah	Kedah	Alor Setar	Anak Bukit	9,492	Sultan	Menteri Besar
Flag of Kelantan	Coat of arms of Kelantan	Kelantan	Kota Bharu	Kubang Kerian	15,040	Sultan	Menteri Besar
Flag of Malacca	Coat of arms of Malacca	Malacca (Malay: Melaka)	Malacca City	—	1,712	Yang di-Pertua Negeri (Governor)	Chief Minister
Flag of Negeri Sembilan	Coat of arms of Negeri Sembilan	Negeri Sembilan	Seremban	Seri Menanti	6,658	Yang di-Pertuan Besar (Grand Ruler)	Menteri Besar
Flag of Pahang	Coat of arms of Pahang	Pahang	Kuantan	Pekan	35,965	Sultan	Menteri Besar
Flag of Penang	Coat of arms of Penang	Penang (Malay: Pulau Pinang)	George Town	—	1,049	Yang di-Pertua Negeri (Governor)	Chief Minister
Flag of Perak	Coat of arms of Perak	Perak	Ipoh	Kuala Kangsar	21,146	Sultan	Menteri Besar
Flag of Perlis	Coat of arms of Perlis	Perlis	Kangar	Arau	819	Raja	Menteri Besar
Flag of Selangor	Coat of arms of Selangor	Selangor^{*}	Shah Alam	Klang	7,951	Sultan	Menteri Besar
Flag of Terengganu	Coat of arms of Terengganu	Terengganu	Kuala Terengganu		12,958	Sultan	Menteri Besar

^{*} Two federal territories are embedded within Selangor, which are Kuala Lumpur and Putrajaya.

=== Thailand ===
Map of southern Thailand

Seal	Provinces	Malay name	Capital	Area (km^{2})	Head of Province	Head of Government
	Chumphon	Jumbara	Chumphon	6,009	Governor	PAO
	Krabi	Kera or Kerambit	Krabi	4,709	Governor	PAO
	Nakhon Si Thammarat	Negara Sri Dharmaraja (simply known as Ligor)	Nakhon Si Thammarat	9,942.5	Governor	PAO
	Narathiwat	Manara	Narathiwat	4,475	Governor	PAO
	Pattani	Patani	Pattani	1,940.4	Governor	PAO
	Phang Nga	Pangan or Kuala Bungga	Phang Nga	4,170	Governor	PAO
	Phatthalung	Merdelong	Phatthalung	3,424.5	Governor	PAO
	Phuket	Bukit	Phuket	543	Governor	PAO
	Ranong	Rundung	Ranong	3,298	Governor	PAO
	Satun	Setul	Satun	2,479	Governor	PAO
	Songkhla	Singgora	Songkhla; Largest city: Hat Yai	7,393.9	Governor	PAO
	Surat Thani	Bentong also known as Kota Cahaya (Chaiya district)	Surat Thani	12,891.5	Governor	PAO
	Trang	Terang	Trang	4,917.5	Governor	PAO
	Yala	Jala	Yala	4,521.1	Governor	PAO

=== Myanmar ===
- Tanintharyi Region - Malay name: “Tanah Sari”

== See also ==
- Extreme points of Asia
- Geography of Malaysia
- Golden Chersonese
- List of peninsulas
- Malay Archipelago
- Malaya (disambiguation)
- Malaysia–Thailand border
- Tenasserim Hills
