= Emarhendia =

Scientific classification
- Kingdom: Plantae
- Clade: Tracheophytes
- Clade: Angiosperms
- Clade: Eudicots
- Clade: Asterids
- Order: Lamiales
- Family: Gesneriaceae
- Genus: Emarhendia; Kiew, A.Weber & B.L.Burtt (1997-1998 publ. 1998)
- Species: E. bettiana

Binomial name
- Emarhendia bettiana (M.R.Hend.) Kiew, A.Weber & B.L.Burtt

Synonyms
- Paraboea bettiana M.R.Hend. (1933)

Genus of plants

Emarhendia is a monotypic genus of flowering plants belonging to the family Gesneriaceae. It only contains one species, Emarhendia bettiana (M.R.Hend.) Kiew, A.Weber & B.L.Burtt.

It is a subshrub endemic to Pahang in Peninsular Malaysia.

The genus name of Emarhendia is in honour of M. R. Henderson (1899–1982), a Scottish botanist, and it was published and described in Beitr. Biol. Pflanzen Vol.70 on page 398 in (1997-1998, publ. 1998). The species has one known synonym, Paraboea bettiana M.R.Hend..
