= Bodgaya =

Bodgaya may refer to:

- Bodh Gaya, a city in India
- Bodgaya Island, an island in Malaysia
