= Mount Bombalai =

Mountain in Malaysia

- Location within Malaysia

Highest point
- Elevation: 531 m (1,742 ft)
- Prominence: 212 m (696 ft)
- Coordinates: 4°23′41″N 117°52′35″E

Naming
- Native name: Gunung Bombalai (Malay)

Geography
- Location: Tawau Division, Sabah, Malaysia

Geology
- Last eruption: Holocene

Mount Bombalai (Malay: Gunung Bombalai) is a volcanic cone mountain in the Tawau Division of Sabah, Malaysia. It reaches a height of approximately 531 metres (1,742 ft).

== Geology ==
The mountain is part of the Tawau volcanic field which contributed to the prominent topographic features of the Semporna Peninsula in northeastern Borneo and the western side of a valley in its middle section. The low volcanic cone is north of Sebatik Island and has a roughly 300-m-wide crater breached to the south. Two young lava flows extend almost to the coastal plain. The flows are considered younger than a lava flow radiocarbon dated at about 27,000 years before present, and the extrusion of basaltic lavas possibly continued into the Holocene epoch. Presence of geothermal activity has been reported in the surrounding mountains.

== See also ==
- List of volcanoes in Malaysia
