= Mount Maria (Malaysia) =

Mountain in Sabah, Malaysia

- Location within Malaysia

Highest point
- Elevation: 1,067 m (3,501 ft)
- Coordinates: 4°26′6″N 117°57′9″E

Geography
- Location: Tawau Division, Sabah, Malaysia

Geology
- Last eruption: Holocene

Mount Maria (Malay: Gunung Maria) is a volcanic cone mountain located at the Tawau Division of Sabah, Malaysia. It reaches a height of approximately 1,067 metres (3,501 ft).

== Geology ==
The mountain is formed through the late Pleistocene volcanisms which contributed to the prominent topographic features of the Semporna Peninsula and its surrounding areas. Together with Mount Lucia in the Tawau volcanic field, the mountains are made up of Pleistocene dacites. The surrounding mountain peak has been reported with the potential of generating renewable energy such as geothermal power.

== History ==
Since 1979, it has been a part of Tawau Hills Park. Jungle trekking activities are served by the park where the forest trail also leads to Mount Lucia and Mount Magdalena.

== See also ==
- List of volcanoes in Malaysia
