= Mount Lucia =

Volcanic cone in Malaysia

- Location within Malaysia

Highest point
- Elevation: 1,201 m (3,940 ft)
- Coordinates: 4°28′12″N 117°56′21.84″E

Geography
- Location: Tawau Division, Sabah, Malaysia

Geology
- Last eruption: Holocene

Mount Lucia (Malay: Gunung Lucia) is a volcanic cone mountain located at the Tawau Division of Sabah, Malaysia. It reaches a height of approximately 1,201 metres (3,940 ft).

== Geology ==
The mountain is formed through the late Pleistocene volcanisms. Together with Mount Maria in the Tawau volcanic field, the mountains are made up of Pleistocene dacite.

== History ==
Since 1979, it has been a part of Tawau Hills Park. Jungle trekking activities are served by the park where the forest trail also leads to Mount Magdalena and Mount Maria.

== See also ==
- List of volcanoes in Malaysia
