= Skull Hill, Malaysia =

Archaeological site

Skull Hill
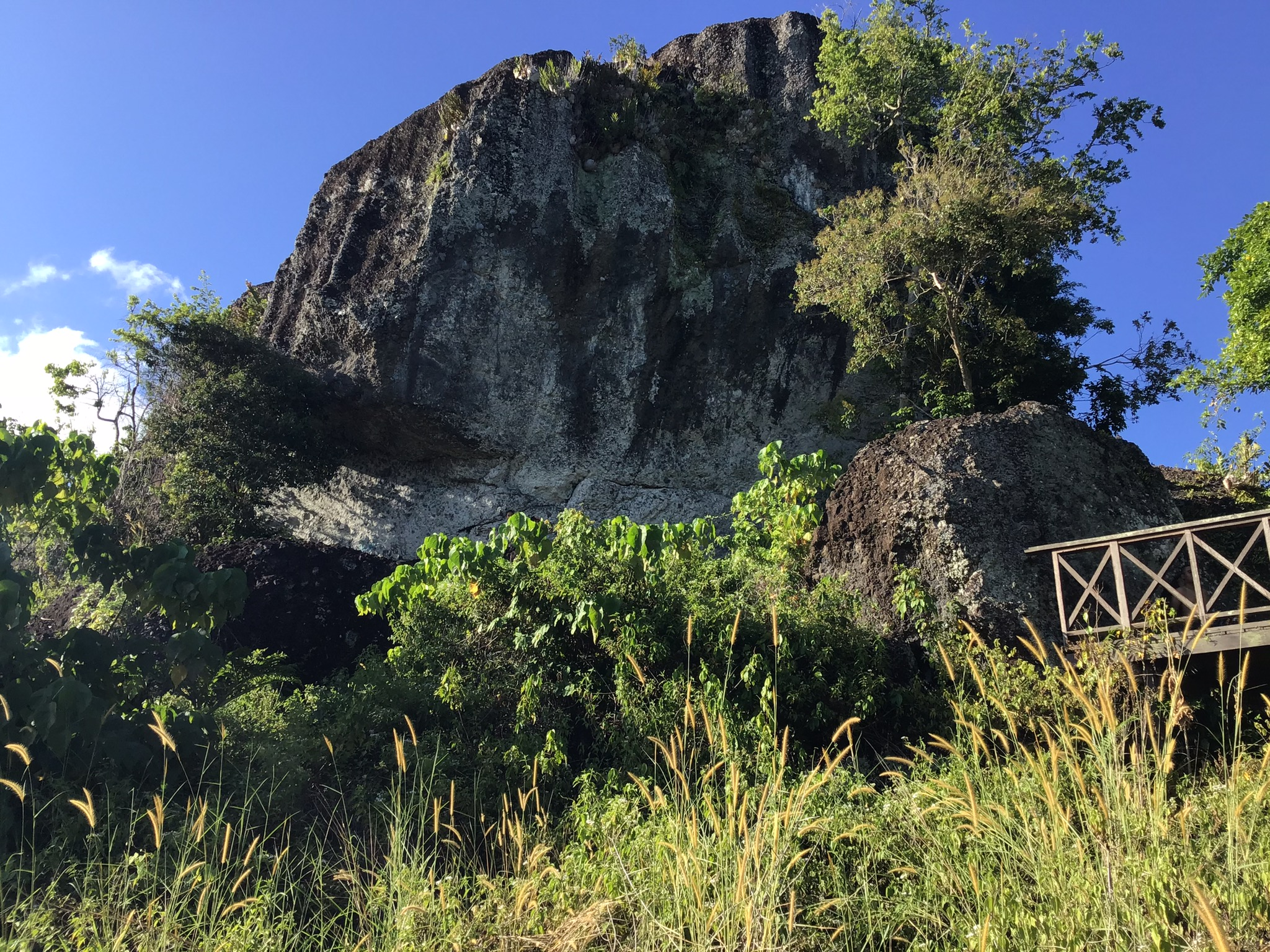
- Skull Hill

Highest point
- Elevation: 182.88 m (600.0 ft)
- Coordinates: 4°26′23.767″N 118°37′19.735″E

Naming
- Native name: Bukit Tengkorak (Malay)

Geography
- Location within Malaysia
- Country: Malaysia
- State: Sabah
- Region: Tawau Division
- District: Semporna

Skull Hill (Malay: Bukit Tengkorak) is an archaeological hill site located at Tampi Tampi Road, about 10 kilometres (6.2 mi) south of Semporna town.

== Geology ==
The hill is a volcanic rock-shelter site and a part of volcano mouth of 2 kilometres (1.2 mi) in diameter. It is surrounded by numerous isolated hills and mountains with most representing the sites of extinct volcanoes ranging from Pliocene to Quaternary in age.

== History ==
Between 1994 and 1995, joint archaeological research was undertaken by Centre for Archaeological Research of Malaysia and Sabah Museum team at the hill. Based on the findings from two seasons of excavations until the base of the undisturbed cultural deposits for about a period of five weeks at two volcanic outcrops near the hill summit, the subsequent layers contained undisturbed artefacts. A broad range of archaeological materials were recovered during the excavations which include large quantities of potsherds, chert, agate and obsidian stone tools, polished stone adzes, a stone barkcloth beater as well as some shell and bone artefacts. Abundant food remains were also discovered, mostly in the form of marine molluscs, fish bones and some terrestrial animal bones.

The site has been identified as the largest pottery making factory in Southeast Asia during the Neolithic period. The hill slopes are littered with numerous pottery shards with various patterns dating 3,000 BP. An ethno-archaeological study shows that such pottery making is still practised by the Bajau community in Semporna to this day. This pottery site has links between local communities and traders from around the Andaman Sea. The hill provides evidence of prehistoric sea trade and one of the world's longest human movement dating back 3,000 years.
