= Si Amil Island =

Island of Sabah, Malaysia

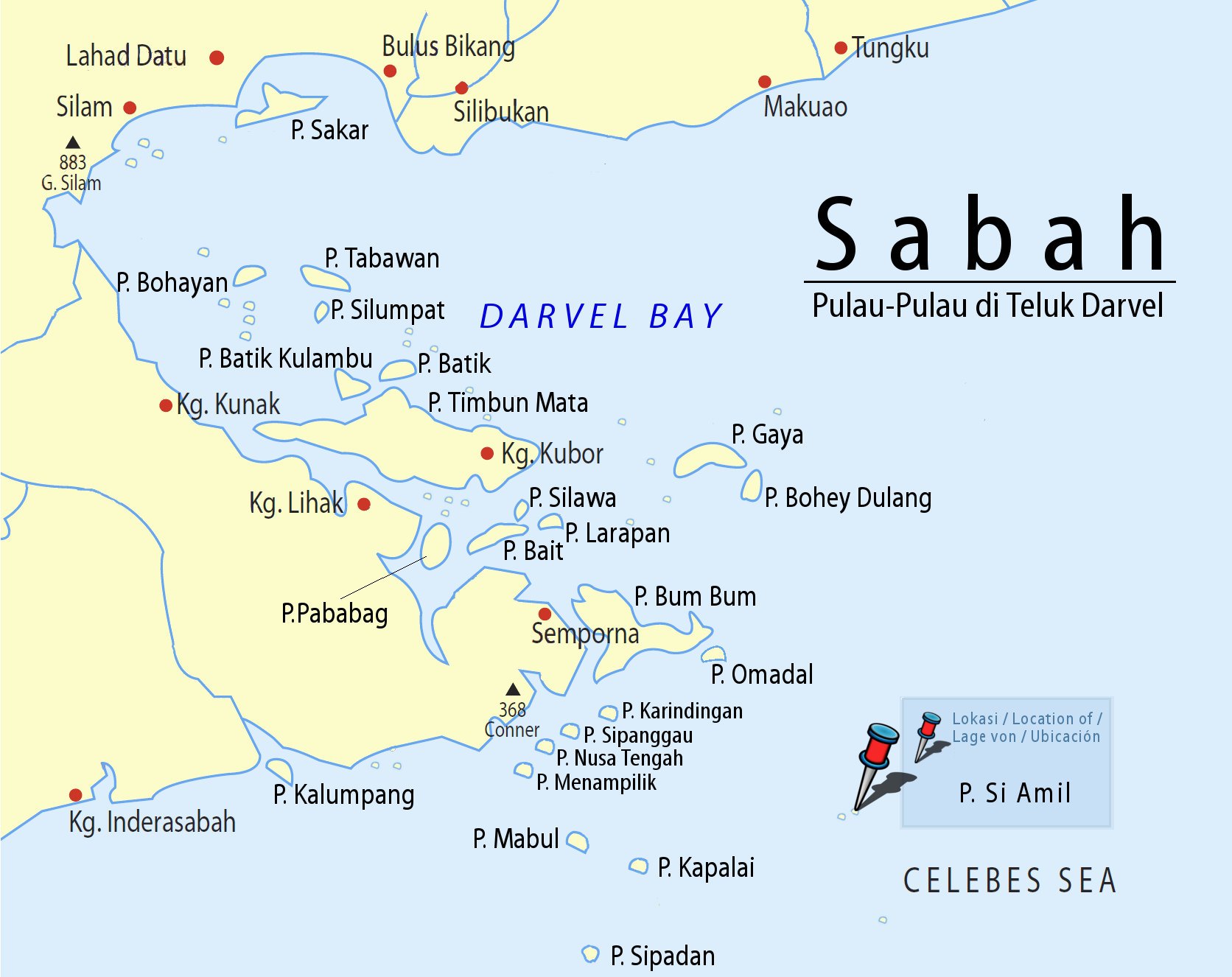
- Location of Si Amil Island
- Interactive map of Si Amil Island

Geography
- Coordinates: 4°18′50″N 118°52′18″E

Administration
- Malaysia
- State: Sabah
- Division: Tawau
- District: Semporna

Si Amil Island (Malay: Pulau Si Amil) is a Malaysian island located in the Celebes Sea on the state of Sabah. Si Amil Island is situated northeast of Danawan Island.

== See also ==
- List of islands of Malaysia
