= Mount Magdalena =

Mountain in Sabah, Malaysia

- Location within Malaysia

Highest point
- Elevation: 1,310 m (4,300 ft)
- Listing: Ribu
- Coordinates: 4°29′26.88″N 117°57′47.88″E

Geography
- Location: Tawau Division, Sabah, Malaysia

Geology
- Last eruption: Holocene

Mount Magdalena (Malay: Gunung Magdalena) is a volcanic cone mountain located at the Tawau Division of Sabah, Malaysia. It reaches a height of approximately 1,310 metres (4,298 ft). By prominence Mount Magdalena is at number 24 out of 5,270 peaks in Malaysia and at 6th place out of 383 peaks in Sabah.

== History ==
Since 1979, it has been a part of the Tawau Hills Park. Jungle trekking activities are served by the park where the forest trail also leads to Mount Lucia and Mount Maria.

== See also ==
- List of volcanoes in Malaysia
