= Dent Peninsula =

Peninsula in Sabah, Malaysia

- Location of Dent Peninsula in Sabah
- Dent Peninsula within Malaysia
- Etymology: Semenanjung Dent

Geography
- Location: Sandakan Division; Tawau Division
- Coordinates: 5°12′32.464″N 118°56′10.892″E
- Archipelago: Maritime Southeast Asia
- Adjacent to: Sulu Sea; Celebes Sea
- Highest point: Mount Hatton; 570 metres (1,870 ft)

Administration
- Malaysia
- State: Sabah

The Dent Peninsula (Malay: Semenanjung Dent) is a peninsula in eastern Sabah, Malaysia. It consists of hills and broad coastal areas. The Peninsula is also previously considered as a volcanic arc of the region which have since migrated southward to Semporna Peninsula.

== Geology ==
Volcanic activity in the tertiary causing rise to andesite and dacite in the area around Bakapit in the southern area of the peninsula. The rocks in east of Lahad Datu are mixed volcanic and sedimentary: tuffaceous sandstones and conglomerate mixed with Ayer, Tabanak and Tungku formations materials of shales, mudstones and sandstones. Inner neritic to littoral deposits at the east of the peninsula consist of mudstone, clay and coral limestone with Sabahat (Middle Miocene and Early Pliocene) and Ganduman (Early Pliocene to Late Pliocene) formations materials of lignite, marl and conglomerate. The Ganduman formation displays well preserved outcrops of delta plain deposits grading to shallow marine deltaic and holomarine eastward while the Sabahat is represented by the clinoform and downlap seismic packages. The Togopi formation on the onshore of the peninsula is mainly made of marls and preserves Plio-Pleistocene sedimentary sequences which have a relatively high coral diversity. Based on organic geochemical and petrological analyses, both formations of Sabahat and Ganduman found to be gas-prone source rocks. The narrow continental shelf fronting the coastal areas of both Dent and Semporna Peninsulas also could be exposed to future tsunamis with the active fault in the eastern coast.

== Climate and biodiversity ==
The peninsula especially in the northern generally received mean annual rainfall ranging from 2,000 millimetres to 2,500 millimetres. In the southern coast, the area received annual rainfall ranging from 1,500 millimetres to 2,000 millimetres while the Tungku area received less than 1,500 millimetres. Located in the centre of the peninsula is the Tabin Wildlife Reserve which is a forest reserve area with variety of protected species.
