= Peninsular Malaysian montane rain forests =

Ecoregion on the Malay Peninsula

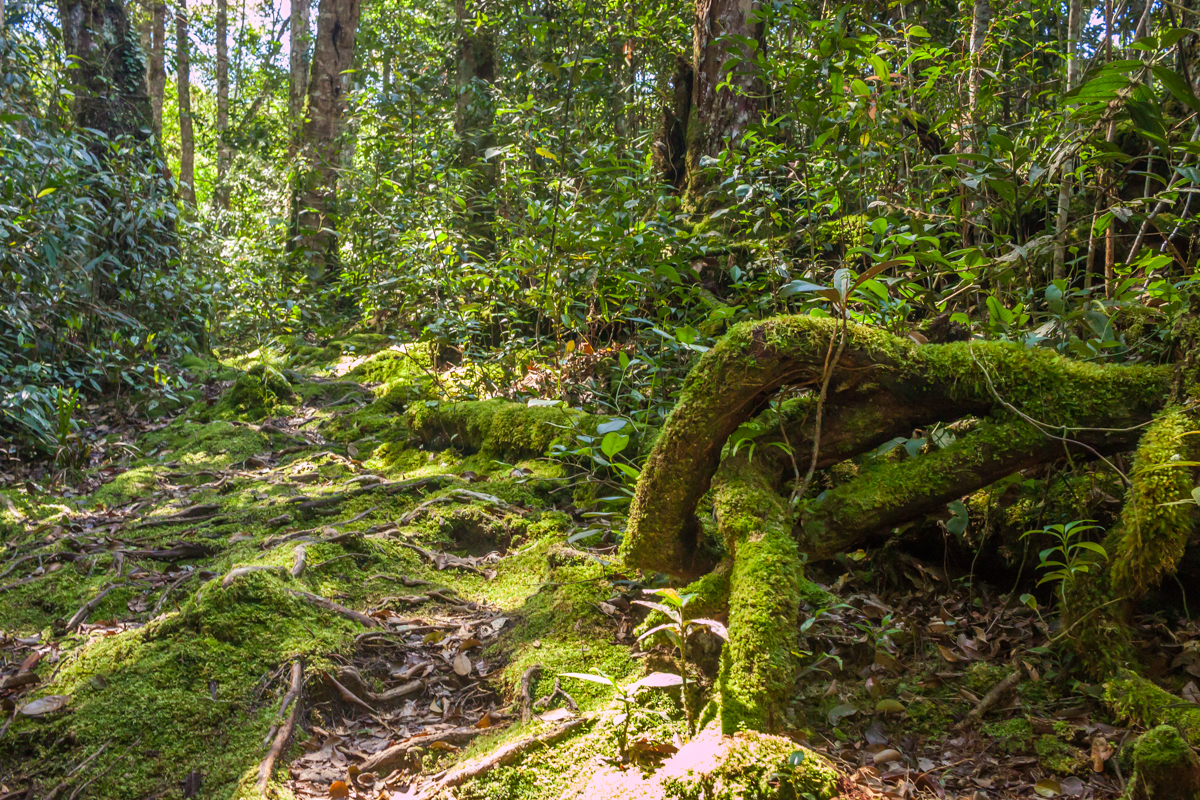
- Forest on Gunung Berembun in the Cameron Highlands.

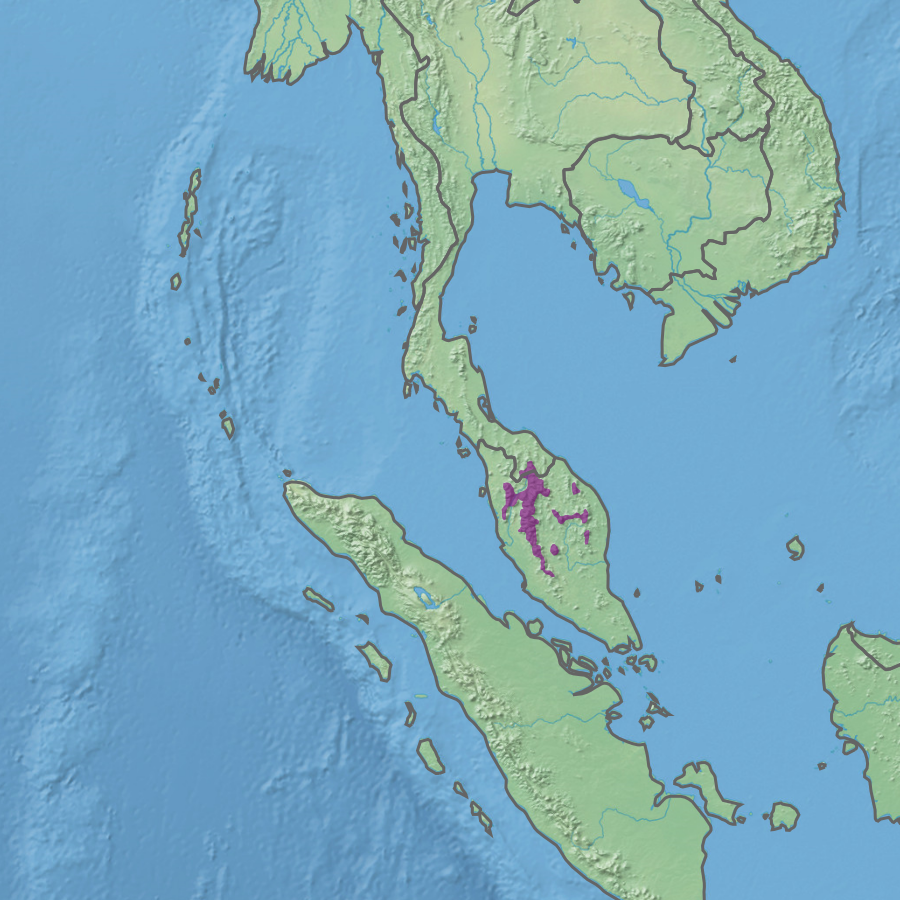
- Ecoregion territory (in purple)

Ecology
- Realm: Indomalayan
- Biome: Tropical and subtropical moist broadleaf forests
- Borders: Peninsular Malaysian rain forests

Geography
- Area: 17,097 km^{2} (6,601 mi^{2})
- Countries: Malaysia; Thailand

Conservation
- Conservation status: Vulnerable
- Protected: 5,678 km^{2} (33%)

The Peninsular Malaysian montane rain forests is an ecoregion on the Malay Peninsula. It occupies the mountainous spine of the peninsula in Malaysia and southernmost Thailand. It is in the tropical and subtropical moist broadleaf forests biome.

== Geography ==
The ecoregion occupies elevations above 1000 meters in the Titiwangsa Mountains, which form the mountainous backbone of the Malay Peninsula. It also includes ranges to the east in Kelantan, Terengganu, and Pahang states. The highest peak in the Titiwangsa Mountains is Mount Korbu at 2,183 meters elevation. Other peaks include Mount Tahan (2,188 m), the highest peak in peninsular Malaysia, and Mount Benum (2,130 m). The ecoregion is surrounded at lower elevations by the ecologically-distinct Peninsular Malaysian rain forests.

== Flora ==
The montane forests are made up of evergreen trees, which form a canopy 10–20 meters high. The tree canopy is lower than the lowland forests and lack emergent trees, and the trees mostly lack buttressed roots and have smaller glossy-green leaves. Ephiphyes, including orchids, ferns, mosses, and lichens, are more abundant.

Above 1000 meters elevation, the dipterocarps that characterize the lowland forests become fewer, and trees in the beech family (Fagaceae) become predominant, including evergreen oaks (Quercus) and species of Lithocarpus and Castanopsis. Trees in the Myrtle family (Myrtaceae) and conifers are also common, including species of Agathis, Dacrydium, and Podocarpus.

Upper montane forests occur above 1500 meters elevation. Trees form a flat-topped canopy from 1.5 to 18 meters high. Epiphytes, including orchids, ferns, leafy liverworts, and lichens, are abundant. Common trees include species of Dacrydium, Daphniphyllum, Eurya, Ficus, Gordonia, Ilex, Leptospermum, Lindera, Lithocarpus, Melicope, Podocarpus, Prunus, Quercus, Syzygium, Schima, Ternstroemia, and Tristaniopsis, and Pterophylla fraxinea. Rhododendrons are common shrubs, especially on acidic and peat soils.

== Fauna ==
The ecoregion home to several large and endangered mammal species – Asian elephant (Elephas maximus), gaur (Bos gaurus), tiger (Panthera tigris), sun bear (Helarctos malayanus), Malayan tapir (Tapirus indicus), clouded leopard (Neofelis nebulosa), and siamang (Symphalangus syndactylus). The Malayan mountain spiny rat (Maxomys inas) is the only endemic mammal. The Sumatran rhinoceros (Dicerorhinus sumatrensis) once inhabited the forests, but Malaysia's last rhinoceroses died in 2019, and the species' few remaining members survive only in Sumatra.

The ecoregion is home to over 250 species of birds, including the endangered Malayan crested argus (Rheinardia nigrescens), and the threatened endemic mountain peacock-pheasant (Polyplectron inopinatum).

== Conservation ==
A 2017 assessment found that 5,678 km², or 33%, of the ecoregion is in protected areas. Protected areas within or partially within the ecoregion include Royal Belum State Park, Cameron Highlands Wildlife Sanctuary (677.97 km²), Grik Wildlife Reserve (518.0 km²), and Bukit Kutu Forest Reserve (24.43 km²) in the Titiwangsa Mountains. Royal Belum State Park adjoins Bang Lang National Park and Hala-Bala Wildlife Sanctuary in Thailand, which protect the Thai portion of the ecoregion. Taman Negara National Park (4524.54 km²) includes Mount Tahan and the montane forests to the east, as well as lowland and hill forest.
