= Peninsular Malaysian peat swamp forests =

Ecoregion in Peninsular Malaysia

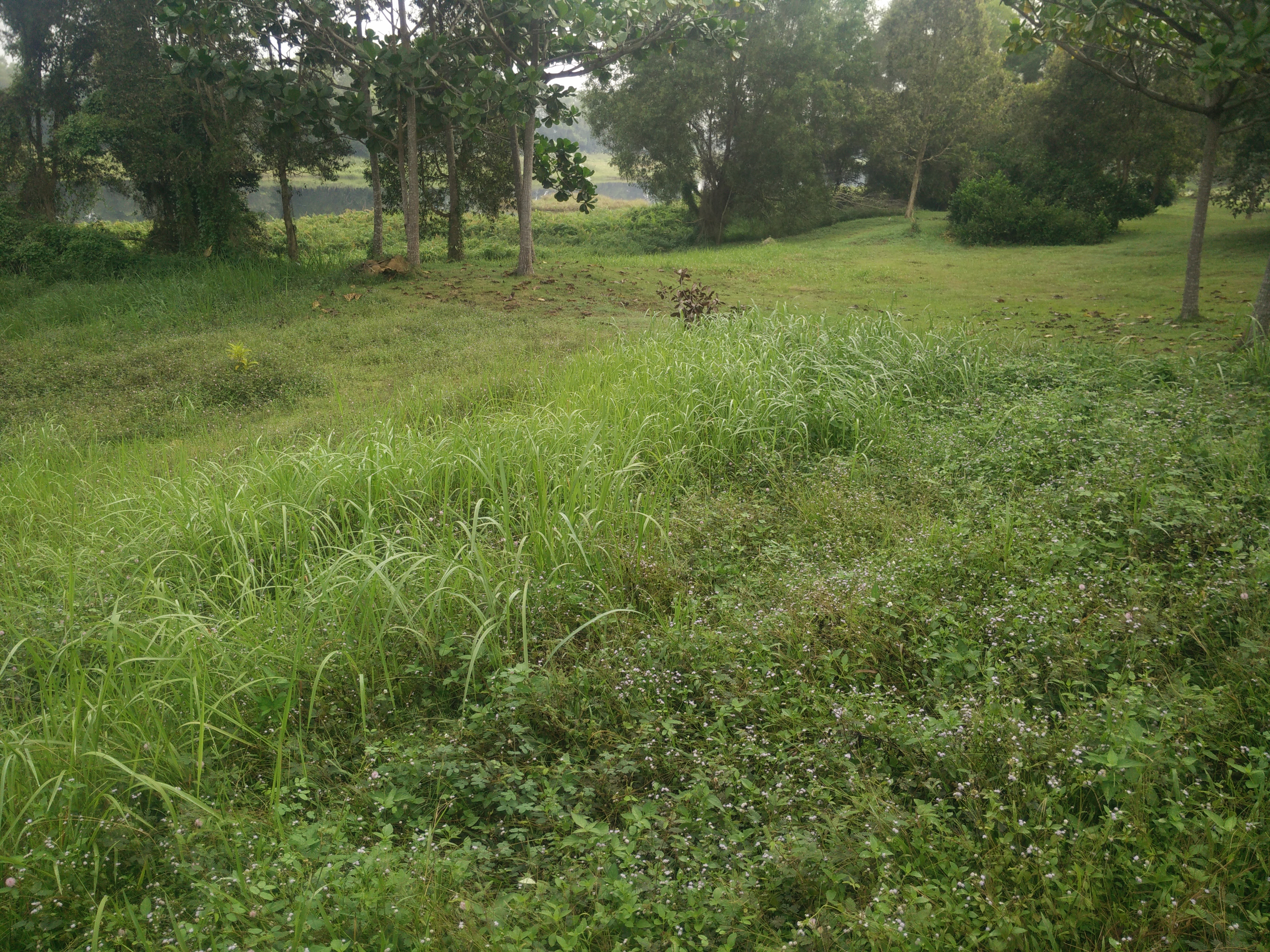
- Paya Indah Wetlands

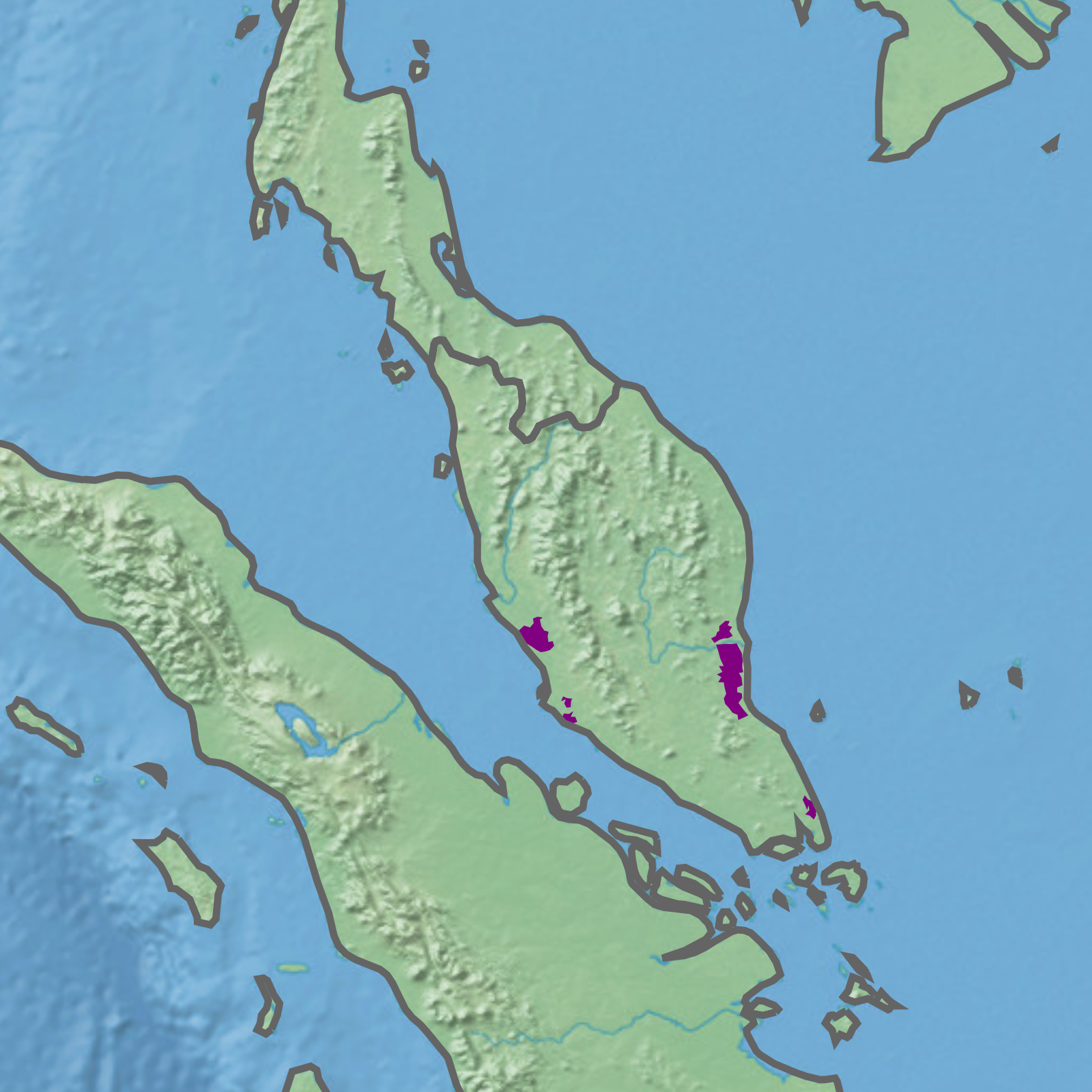
- Ecoregion territory (in purple)

Ecology
- Realm: Indomalayan
- Biome: tropical and subtropical moist broadleaf forests
- Borders: Peninsular Malaysian rain forests

Geography
- Area: 3,610 km^{2} (1,390 sq mi)
- Country: Malaysia

Conservation
- Conservation status: Critical/endangered
- Protected: 142 km² (4%)

The Peninsular Malaysian peat swamp forests is an ecoregion on Malay Peninsula, which includes portions of Malaysia. It is in the tropical and subtropical moist broadleaf forests biome.

== Setting ==
The ecoregion covers an area of 3,600 square kilometers (1,400 sq mi) on both the eastern and western sides of the peninsula. The peat swamp forests have formed over hundreds of years, as sediment and organic debris deposited by rivers are trapped behind mangroves, gradually building up a layer of waterlogged, acidic, nutrient-poor soil. These forests are less diverse than the surrounding Peninsular Malaysian rain forests, but are home to many endangered animals.

== Flora ==
Dipterocarps, including Shorea albida, are the dominant trees, while strangler figs (Ficus spp.) are common at the edges of the swamp forests. Pandan (Pandanus amaryllifolius) and the red sealing wax palm (Cyrtostachys renda) are common understory plants. These and other plants provide a source of food for a host of animals, including birds.

== Fauna ==
The ecoregion home to many endangered species, including tigers, Malayan tapirs (Tapirus indicus), clouded leopards (Neofelis nebulosa), Asian elephants (Elephas maximus), and previously also Sumatran rhinoceroses (Dicerorhinus sumatrensis).

== Threats ==
Threats to the forests include: mining, rubber harvesting, and clearing of forest for oil palm and coconut plantations. Land draining has also opened a great deal of space in these forests. Many trees are cut down for development of more space, although this has increased peat forest fires.
