= M. R. Henderson =

Scottish botanist (1899–1982)

M. R. Henderson

Murray Ross Henderson (1899–1982) was a Scottish botanist who did most of his botanical work in the Straits Settlements and South Africa. He took a position as a botanist in Malaya in 1921 and became curator of the herbarium in the Singapore Botanical Gardens in 1924.

On the invasion of British Malaya by Japan in World War II, Henderson escaped from Singapore to Sumatra. He travelled from there via Colombo to Durban in South Africa, where he continued to do botanical work at the Kirstenbosch Botanical Garden for the remainder of the war. He returned to Singapore in 1946 and was appointed acting Director of the Singapore Botanic Gardens. He was Director of the Gardens from 1949 to 1954 when he retired to Aberdeen.

M. R. Henderson graduated in botany from the University of Aberdeen. He was elected a Fellow of the Linnean Society in 1922. He authored a number of floras and other botanical texts including the 3-volume Malayan Wild Flowers and Malayan Orchid Hybrids (editor).

He was honoured in 1998, with the naming of plant species from Malaya after him, Emarhendia.
