= Peninsular Malaysian rain forests =

Ecoregion on the Malay Peninsula

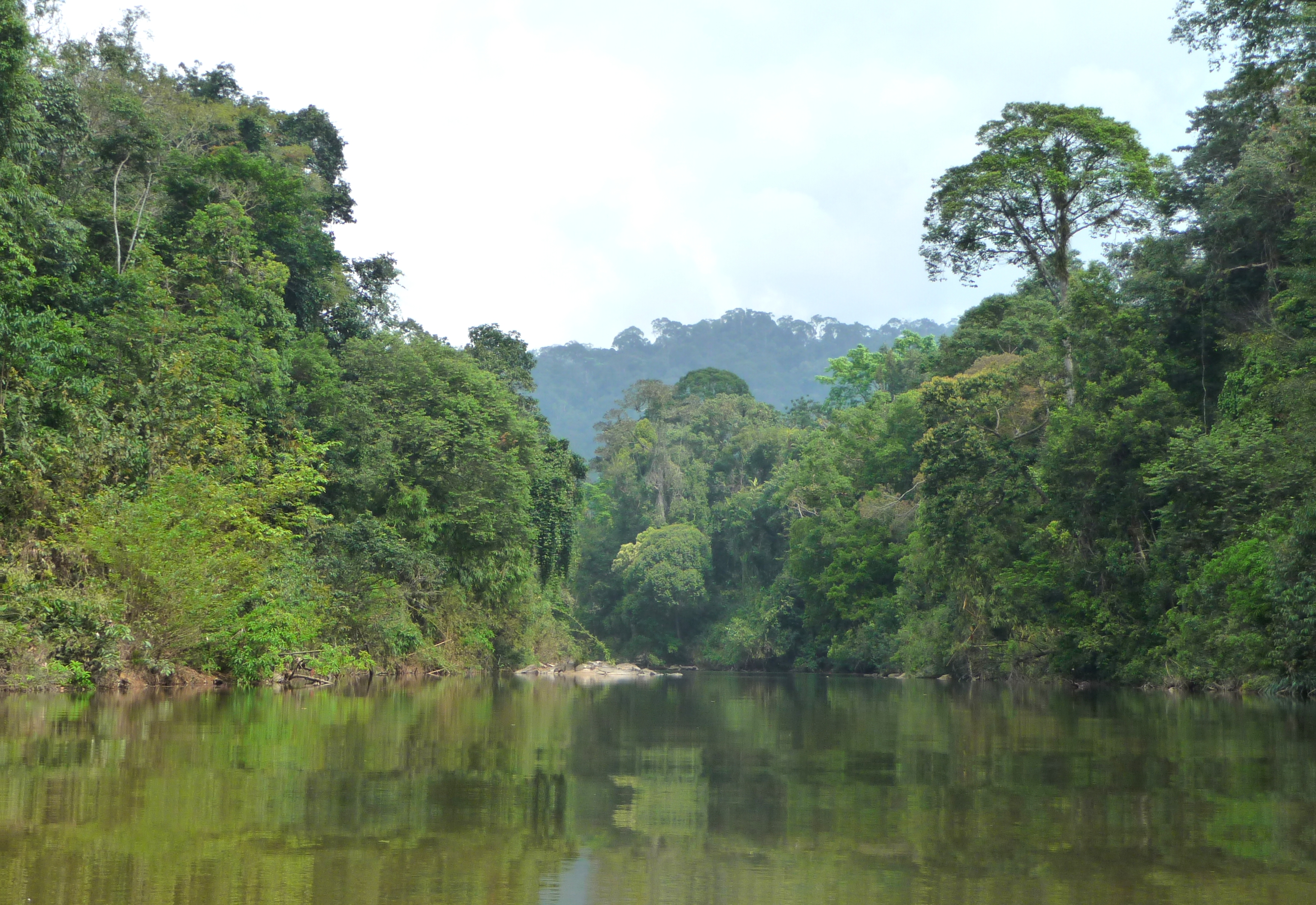
- Kincin River in Endau-Rompin National Park

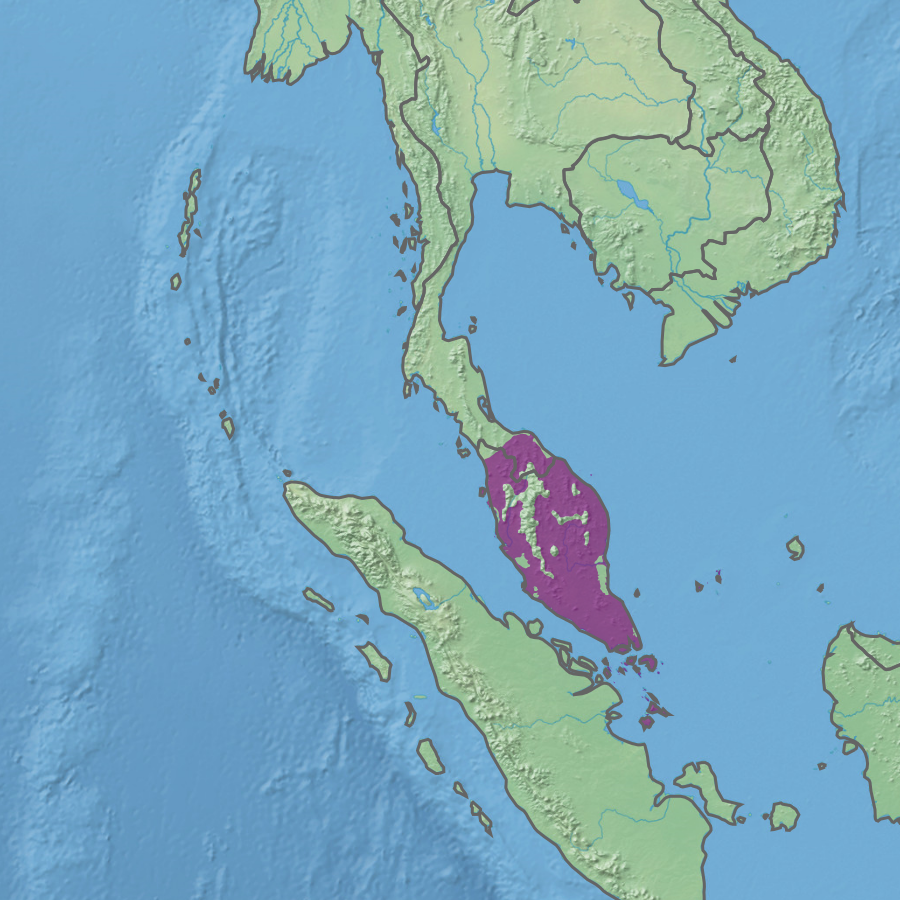
- Ecoregion territory (in purple)

Ecology
- Realm: Indomalayan
- Biome: Tropical and subtropical moist broadleaf forests
- Borders: List: Indochina mangroves; Myanmar Coast mangroves; Peninsular Malaysian montane rain forests; Peninsular Malaysian peat swamp forests; Tenasserim–South Thailand semi-evergreen rain forests

Geography
- Area: 124,564 km^{2} (48,094 mi^{2})
- Countries: Indonesia; Malaysia; Singapore; Thailand

Conservation
- Conservation status: Vulnerable
- Protected: 20,113 km^{2} (16%)

The Peninsular Malaysian rain forests is an ecoregion on the Malay Peninsula and adjacent islands. It is in the tropical and subtropical moist broadleaf forests biome.

== Geography ==
The ecoregion covers most of the southern Malay Peninsula in Malaysia and southern Thailand, and extends southwards to Singapore, the Riau Archipelago, and Lingga Islands, and east to the Anamba Islands.

The peninsula is fringed with mangroves, including the Indochina mangroves on the eastern shore, and the Myanmar coast mangroves on the western shore. The ecologically distinct Peninsular Malaysian peat swamp forests ecoregion are found in waterlogged lowlands on the east and west sides of the peninsula. The Titiwangsa Mountains form the mountainous backbone of the peninsula, and the range's higher elevations are home to the Peninsular Malaysian montane rain forests ecoregion.

== Flora ==
The predominant trees are dipterocarps, including species of Anisoptera, Dipterocarpus, Dryobalanops, Hopea, and Shorea. The forests are home to over 15,000 tree species, and trees of the families Burseraceae and Sapotaceae are also common. Trees form a canopy 24-36 meters high, with emergent trees rising up 45 meters or more. The tallest emergent is Koompassia excelsa, known as tualang, which can grow more than 76 meters high.

== Fauna ==
The ecoregion home to 195 mammal species, including several large and endangered species – Asian elephant (Elephas maximus), gaur (Bos gaurus), tiger (Panthera tigris), Malayan tapir (Tapirus indicus), and clouded leopard (Neofelis nebulosa). The Sumatran rhinoceros (Dicerorhinus sumatrensis) once inhabited the forests, but Malaysia's last rhinoceroses died in 2019, and the species' few remaining members survive only in Sumatra.

== Conservation ==
A 2017 assessment found that 20,113 km^{2}, or 16%, of the ecoregion is in protected areas. Protected areas in the ecoregion include Endau Rompin National Park (1191.59 km²), Endau-Kota Tinggi (West) Wildlife Reserve (805.49 km²), Endau-Kota Tinggi (East) Wildlife Reserve (106.5 km²), Kledang Saiong Forest Reserve (7.1 km²), Krau Wildlife Reserve (623.96 km²), Mersin Wildlife Reserve (74.13 km²), and Ulu Muda Wildlife Reserve (1152.57 km²). Taman Negara National Park (4524.54 km²) and Royal Belum State Park (2072.0 km²) include portions of the ecoregion along with portions of the Peninsular Malaysian montane rain forests.
