= List of rivers of Malaysia =

This is an incomplete list of rivers that flow at least partially in Malaysia. The rivers are grouped by strait or sea. The rivers flowing into the sea are sorted along the coast. Rivers flowing into other rivers are listed by the rivers they flow into. The rivers that have their mouths in Malaysia are given in italics. The same river may be found in more than one state as many rivers cross state borders.

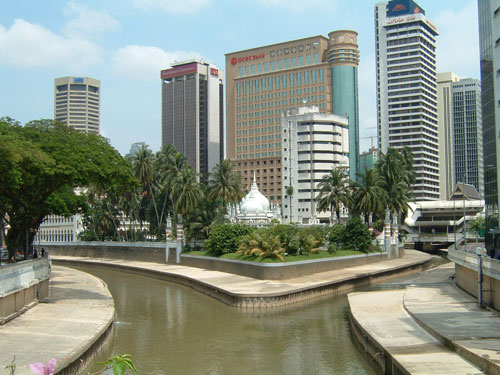
The Gombak River (left) merges with the Klang River (right) in Kuala Lumpur.

== Rivers by state ==
=== Sabah ===
The largest primary rivers on the Sabah:

River	Mouth coordinates	Length (km)	Basin size (km^{2})	Average discharge (m^{3}/s)
South China Sea
Bongawan	5°33′8.928″N 115°50′2.8716″E	32	202.6	15.7
Bukau	5°13′9.606″N 115°36′6.678″E		317.9	24.9
Kawang Kawang	6°31′35.148″N 116°30′6.5268″E	21	286.9	19.4
Kimanis	5°37′15.2004″N 115°53′10.1004″E	31	203.8	16
Klias	5°17′49.9164″N 115°22′35.328″E	37	251.3	21
Lakutan	5°7′24.8808″N 115°33′4.7844″E		195.2	15.7
Membakut	5°32′15.8352″N 115°47′46.5684″E		294.9	22.4
Mengalong	5°0′38.9736″N 115°27′41.292″E	36.3	599.4	49.6
Moyog	5°53′5.91″N 116°2′33.936″E		272.5	17.8
Padas	5°11′6.6156″N 115°33′39.8052″E	220	9,180	375.9
Papar	5°45′7.5348″N 115°54′29.5488″E	80	805	48.5
Tempasok, Kedamaian	6°23′9.1968″N 116°20′51.7344″E	73.5	856.8	62
Tuaran	6°13′17.6088″N 116°11′13.9236″E	80	988	65.4
Sulawesi Sea
Balung	4°17′51.9144″N 118°10′37.866″E		270.5	10.4
Brantian	4°23′58.3044″N 117°37′28.5852″E		652.2	21.2
Kalabakan	4°23′19.6044″N 117°35′27.4596″E		1,371	49.4
Kalumpang	4°20′46.1436″N 118°20′42.0576″E		1,117.9	42.8
Sembakung^{*}	3°43′32.6784″N 117°48′35.388″E	322	9,518.1	627.6
Sembuku^{*}	4°0′32.2488″N 117°26′22.4844″E	170	3,574.6	197.4
Serudong	4°13′21.1188″N 117°36′31.9644″E		1,308	43.7
Tawau	4°14′26.124″N 117°54′26.9856″E		794.3	31.2
Sulu Sea
Bandau	6°34′39.3677″N 116°46′4.1242″E		531.1	30.7
Bengkoka	6°45′40.05″N 116°59′36.942″E		1,142.9	58
Bongan	6°34′42.7404″N 116°49′32.6172″E		700.6	44.9
Bongaya	6°10′19.5636″N 117°35′5.6256″E		320.3	26.5
Kanibongan	6°43′58.332″N 117°16′26.976″E		183.4	11.3
Kapur	5°22′27.5124″N 118°54′38.8908″E		359.1	17.7
Kinabatangan	5°40′59.8404″N 118°33′39.5172″E	563	16,795.5	840
Labuk	5°53′18.9636″N 117°29′58.11″E	260	6,829	516.8
Maruap Besar	5°22′54.534″N 118°52′51.0132″E		291.3	14.6
Matamba (Silibukan)	4°57′54.5292″N 118°27′9.7272″E		535.6	28.1
Paitan	6°32′54.2472″N 117°28′21.864″E		667.3	55.5
Pinang	5°31′5.5812″N 118°33′38.5524″E		346	18.5
Sabahat	5°3′50.9364″N 119°2′5.2332″E		234.6	12.3
Samawang	5°54′17.388″N 117°46′12.2844″E		202.5	20.6
Segaliud	5°44′47.7564″N 117°54′12.762″E		429.5	37.5
Segama	5°29′47.832″N 118°48′31.4172″E	350	4,625.2	228.1
Sendala	5°58′1.6104″N 117°54′43.704″E		158.9	13
Sugut	6°26′12.66″N 117°43′23.6496″E	178	3,094	232.6
Tengarasan	6°36′29.0412″N 117°21′33.1272″E		373.4	24.7
Tinkayu	4°50′16.7568″N 118°10′2.4852″E		794.1	30.4
Tungku	4°59′36.6504″N 118°51′42.8832″E		251.4	13.2

^{*} Total basin

=== Sarawak ===
The largest primary rivers on the Sarawak. The rivers of Sarawak flow into the South China Sea:

River	Mouth coordinates	Length (km)	Basin size (km^{2})	Average discharge (m^{3}/s)
Balingian (Lemai)	3°0′59.5296″N 112°35′1.5936″E	160	2,195	177.1
Baram	4°35′11.4288″N 113°58′30.5796″E	635	22,325	1,844.6
Bedengan	2°58′33.5532″N 112°20′56.9508″E		173.5	14.5
Jernang	1°57′1.9008″N 109°38′45.5388″E		159.2	14.7
Kayan (Stamin)	1°41′45.06″N 109°56′7.9836″E	125	1,057.9	103.5
Kemena	3°10′47.4132″N 113°1′56.4348″E	190	6,000	501.6
Krian (Kerian)	1°47′10.2768″N 111°6′13.68″E	120	1,531.5	110.1
Lawas	4°58′15.4668″N 115°24′54.0864″E	75	997.4	84.9
Limbang	4°51′19.44″N 115°1′46.8768″E	275	3,920	335.3
Lupar	1°30′45.2412″N 110°59′4.4628″E	275	6,558	490
Miri	4°23′56.4072″N 113°58′37.3332″E		577.1	30.2
Mukah (Gigis)	2°54′35.334″N 112°5′44.808″E	205	1,879.2	157
Niah	3°57′57.5928″N 113°42′19.0116″E	105	1,224.6	62.4
Nyalau	3°38′32.7732″N 113°22′58.044″E		177	13.1
Oya	2°52′26.5188″N 111°52′52.536″E	240	2,005	160.9
Penat	2°53′9.3372″N 111°58′38.7876″E		193.6	16.2
Penipah (Penian)	2°55′57.6192″N 112°10′50.2464″E		127.9	10.7
Rajang	2°6′49.3416″N 111°11′24.9432″E	770	52,009	4,715
Sabang (Samarahan)	1°34′50.7432″N 110°32′12.9624″E	115	873.6	75.9
Sadong	1°32′51.63″N 110°44′58.848″E	150	3,645	285.6
Santubong	1°42′39.4992″N 110°18′48.1104″E		109.2	9.5
Sarawak	1°38′24.4392″N 110°29′51.8712″E	120	2,449	211.9
Saribas, Padeh	1°41′59.7444″N 111°6′8.3988″E	160	1,905.7	131.2
Sebako Besar	1°48′37.9908″N 109°47′0.9712″E		109.2	10.1
Sebuyau	1°31′21.4428″N 110°55′54.1812″E		453	34.4
Serupai (Sadupai)	3°3′55.7064″N 112°43′12.8712″E		277.8	22.4
Siang Siang	4°53′25.0548″N 115°19′24.2076″E		101.4	7.8
Sibuti	3°59′31.9344″N 113°43′34.4712″E	80	935	47.6
Similajau	3°31′3.6408″N 113°18′7.4124″E	65	601	44.8
Suai	3°47′44.5812″N 113°29′29.7672″E	130	1,501	86.3
Tatau	3°5′2.1984″N 112°47′53.898″E	270	5,150	429.7
Telong	3°46′10.956″N 113°27′3.6144″E		105.8	7.8
Trusan	4°57′44.9928″N 115°11′28.4172″E	205	2,549.5	180.9

== Rivers by international borders ==
International border	River	Area (km^{2})
Kelantan–Thailand	Golok River	1,011.125
Sabah–Indonesia	Sibuku River	799.452
Sabah–Indonesia	Sembakung River	5,467.765
Sarawak–Brunei	Pandaruan River	222.378

== Rivers by state borders ==
State border	River	Area (km^{2})
Perlis–Kedah	Perlis River	724.398
Penang–Kedah	Perai River	447.824
Penang–Kedah	Jawi River	231.031
Penang–Kedah–Perak	Kerian River	1,420.233
Kedah–Penang	Muda River	4,150.397
Perak–Selangor	Bernam River	2,836.333
Selangor–Federal Territory	Klang River	1,297.382
Selangor–Federal Territory	Buloh River	451.926
Selangor–Federal Territory–Negeri Sembilan	Langat River	2,347.882
Selangor–Negeri Sembilan	Sepang River	101.932
Negeri Sembilan–Malacca	Linggi River	1,297.668
Negeri Sembilan–Malacca	Malacca River	614.575
Malacca–Johor–Negeri Sembilan	Kesang River	658.263
Johor–Negeri Sembilan	Muar River	6,137.800
Johor–Pahang	Endau River	4,739.059
Pahang–Negeri Sembilan	Pahang River	28,682.247

== Rivers flowing into the Celebes Sea ==
=== Sabah ===
- Kalabakan River
- Kalumpang River
- Serudong River
- Silabukan River
- Tawau River
- Tingkayu River

== Rivers flowing into the South China Sea ==
=== Johor ===
- Endau River
- Sembrong River (110 km)
- Jemaluang River (40 km)
- Mersing River (60 km)
- Sedili Besar River (57 km)

=== Kelantan ===
- Golok River (110 km)
- Kelantan River (248 km)
  - Galas River (87 km)
    - Nenggeri River (52 km)
    - Bernam River, Kelantan ( km)
  - Dabong River ( km)
- Lebir River (87 km)
- Kemasin River
- Semerak River
- Raja Gali River
- Pengkalan Datu River
- Mak Neralang River
- Bachok River
- Pengkalan Chepa River (10 km)
- Melawi River, Bachok
- Sungai Dua River, Bachok
- Tapang River

=== Pahang ===
- Endau River (280 km)
  - Anak Endau River (110 km)
- Kuantan River (86 km)
- Pahang River (459 km)
  - Jelai River (97 km)
    - Lipis River (32 km)
      - Dong River
        - Gali River
          - Raub River
          - Gali River Son
      - Semantan Hulu River
    - Kechau River (63 km)
      - Bedong River (35 km)
        - Memkirai River (21 km)
      - Papan River (9 km)
    - Tanum River (12.5 km)
      - Telang River (33 km)
      - Betong River (20 km)
      - Hijau River (11 km)
  - Tembeling River (110 km)
    - Tahan River (135 km)
    - Jerantut River (13 km)
  - Triang River (27 km)
    - Serting River (40 km)
    - Bera River (60 km)
  - Semantan River
    - Temerloh River
    - Bentong River
  - Jeransang River (17 km)
  - Lepar River (55 km)
  - Cheka River (49 km)
  - Teh River (14 km)
    - Maran River
- Pontian River, Pahang
- Beletil River (18 km)
- Besul River (10 km)
- Burau River (12 km)
- Cerating River (52 km)
- Rompin River (83 km)
  - Keratong River (22 km)

=== Negeri Sembilan ===
- Triang River
- Serting River

=== Sabah ===
- Apas River
- Bandau River, Sabah
- Betotan River
- Binsuluk River
- Bongawan River (32 km)
- Bongaya River
- Bongon River
- Brantian River
- Bukau River
- Burong River
- Gum-Gum Besar River
- Inanam River
- Jeragan Bistari River
- Kaindangan River
- Karamuak River
- Kanibongan River
- Keguraan River
- Kimanis River (31 km)
- Klagan River
- Klias River
- Kolapis River
- Kretam Besar River
- Lakutan River
- Langkon River
- Linayukan River
- Mamahat River
- Manalunan River
- Maruap River
- Membakut River
- Mengalong River
- Mengkabong River
- Merotai River
- Milau River
- Millian River
- Moyog River
- Mumiang River
- Padas River (120 km)
- Papar River (80 km)
- Pegagau River
- Pimpin River
- Sabahan River
- Sahabat River
- Samawang River
- Sapagaya River
- Segaliud River
- Sekong Besar River
- Sengarong River
- Sepagaya River
- Sibunga Besar River
- Simandalan River
- Sinsilog River
- Suanlamba Besar River
- Sulaman River
- Tandek River
- Tanjung Labian River
- Tatulit River
- Tegupi River
- Telaga River
- Tempasuk River (21.5 km)
- Kedamaian River (52 km)
- Warlu River (33 km)
- Kawang Kawang River (21 km)
- Tiram River, Sabah
- Tuaran River (80 km)
- Ulu Tungku River
- Umas Umas River

=== Sarawak ===
- Balingian River
- Baram River
- Bayan River
- Bedengan River
- Kayan River
- Kemena River
- Kerian River, Sarawak
- Lawas River
- Likau River
- Limbang River
- Lupar River
- Maludam River
- Matu River
- Mukah River
- Niah River
- Nyalau River
- Oya River
- Pandaruan River
- Rajang River
  - Balleh River
  - Balui River
  - Bangkit River
  - Bintangor River
  - Igan River
  - Katibas River
- Rambungan River
- Sadong River
- Salak River
- Samarahan River
- Samusam River
- Santubong River
- Sarawak River
  - Maong River
  - Padungan River
- Saribas River
- Sarupai Sadupai River
- Sebuyau River
- Sematan River
- Sembakung River
- Siang Siang River
- Sibu Laut River
- Sibuti River
- Similajau River
- Sparan River
- Suai River
- Tatau River
- Telong River
- Terusan River

=== Terengganu ===
- Besut River (69 km)
- Kenak River (13 km)
- Pelagat River (28 km)
- Jengai River (63 km)
- Dungun River (88.4 km)
- Ibai River (18 km)
- Nerus River (105.1 km)
- Merang River (8 km)
- Keluang Besar River (19 km)
- Kemaman River (167 km)
- Kertih River (12 km)
- Cukai River (24 km)
- Tebak River (29 km)
- Ibok River (28 km)
- Jabor River (24 km)
- Cherol River (37 km)
- Marang River (34 km)
- Mercang River (29 km)
- Paka River, Terengganu (41.6 km)
- Setiu River (126 km)
- Terengganu River (20 km)

== Rivers flowing into the Strait of Malacca ==
=== Federal Territory of Kuala Lumpur ===
- Buloh River (11.6 km)
- Kerayong River (20 km)
- Midah River (4 km)
- Klang River (120 km:40 km WPKL)
  - Gombak River (30 km)
- Langat River (78 km)

=== Johor ===
- Batu Pahat River (12 km)
- Benut River (30 km)
- Kesang River (37 km)
- Muar River (250 km)
- Segamat River (23 km)
- Emas River (85 km)
- Pulai River (22 km)
- Pontian kecil River (25 km)
- Pontian Besar River (16.5 km)
- Sanglang River (22.5 km)
- Sarang Buaya River (8 km)

=== Kedah ===
- Kedah River (92 km)
- Kerian River (90 km)
- Merbok River (45 km)
- Muda River (203 km)
- Pedu River (31 km)
- Tajar River (8.5 km)
- Pendang River (55 km)
- Kulim River (19.2 km)
- Tekai River (31 km)
- Padang Terap River (50 km)
- Anak Bukit River (15 km)
- Padang Kerbau River (29 km)
- Dingin River (8 km)
- Sedim River (68 km)
- Baling River (10 km)
- Ketil River (103.6 km)
- Baling River (10.7 km)
- Chepir River (27 km
- Yan Kechil River (12 km)

=== Malacca ===
- Udang River (7 km)
- Duyong River (15 km)
- Kesang River (37 km)
- Linggi River (84 km)
- Malacca River (40 km)

=== Negeri Sembilan ===
- Linggi River (84 km)
- Lukut Besar River (22 km)
- Malacca River (40 km)
- Muar River (250 km)
- Tampin River (11 km)
- Gemencheh River (55.5 km)
- Gemas River (33 km)
- Sepang River (30 km)

=== Penang ===
- Muda River (203 km)
- Juru River (19 km)
- Perai River (73 km)
- Jawi River (15 km)
- Kerian River (90 km)
- Relau River (3.2 km)
- Teluk Bahang River (2 km)
- Air Putih River (11.8 km)
- Pinang River (3.1 km)
- Air Itam River (3.8 km)
- Dondang River (6.4 km)

=== Perak ===
- Bernam River (200 km)
- Beruas River (37.3 km)
- Jarum Mas River (4 km)
- Kerian River (90 km)
- Kurau River (92 km)
- Larut River (Jaha River) (25 km)
- Manjung River (18 km)
- Kampar River (414 km)
- Perak River (427 km)
  - Kinta River (100 km)
- Sangga Besar River (Sepetang River) (33 km)
- Temerloh River (14 km)
  - Dinding River (15 km)
- Tiram River, Perak (3.6 km)
- Bidor River (17.9 km)

=== Perlis ===
- Besar River, Perlis (6.5 km)
- Perlis River (11.8 km)
- Korok River (17 km)
- Mati River (13.3 km)
- Abi River (13.9 km)
- Arau River (21.5 km)
- Tasoh River (9.6 km)
- Santan River (10 km)
- Panggas River (7 km)
- Jernih River (8 km)
- Pelarik River (8.5 km)
- Batu Pahat River (6 km)
- Gial River (7.8 km)
- Kechor River (7 km)
- Jarum River (10.3 km)
- Temenggung River (6.75 km)
- Kayang River (6.4 km)
- Siran River (7.5 km)
- Chuping River (5.5 km)
- Kurong Batang River (4.7 km)
- Lencong Utara (5.5 km)
- Jalan Perlis River (5.3 km)
- Mentaloon River (5.5 km)
- Chuchoh River (4.8 km)
- Repoh River (4.5 km)
- Kurong Tengar River (4 km)
- Padang River (4.2 km)
- Ngulang River (3.2 km)
- Tok Pulau River (3.7 km)
- Jejawi River (3.4 km)
- Bongor Kudong River (2.9 km)
- Seriab River (6.5 km)
- Banat River (4.4 km)

=== Selangor ===
- Bernam River (200 km)
- Buloh River (11.6 km)
- Klang River (120 km)
  - Ampang River (18.3 km)
  - Damansara River (21 km)
  - Kemensah River (2.7 km)
  - Kuyoh River (10 km)
  - Penchala River (14 km)
- Langat River (78 km)
  - Labu River (18 km)
  - Semenyih River (37 km)
- Selangor River (110 km)
- Sepang River (30 km)
- Batu River (25.3 km)
- Tengi River (43 km)

== Rivers flowing into the Sulu Sea ==
=== Sabah ===
- Abal River
- Bode Besar River
- Kinabatangan River (560 km)
- Labuk River (260 km)
  - Liwagu River (215 km)
- Paitan River
- Segama River (350 km)
- Sibuku River
- Sugut River (178 km)

== Rivers flowing into the Tebrau Strait ==
=== Johor ===
- Johor River (212 km)
  - Segget River (4 km)
- Pulai River (38 km)
- Skudai River (46 km)
- Tebrau River (33 km)
  - Pelentong River, Johor (9 km)
