= Papar River =

River in Sabah, Malaysia

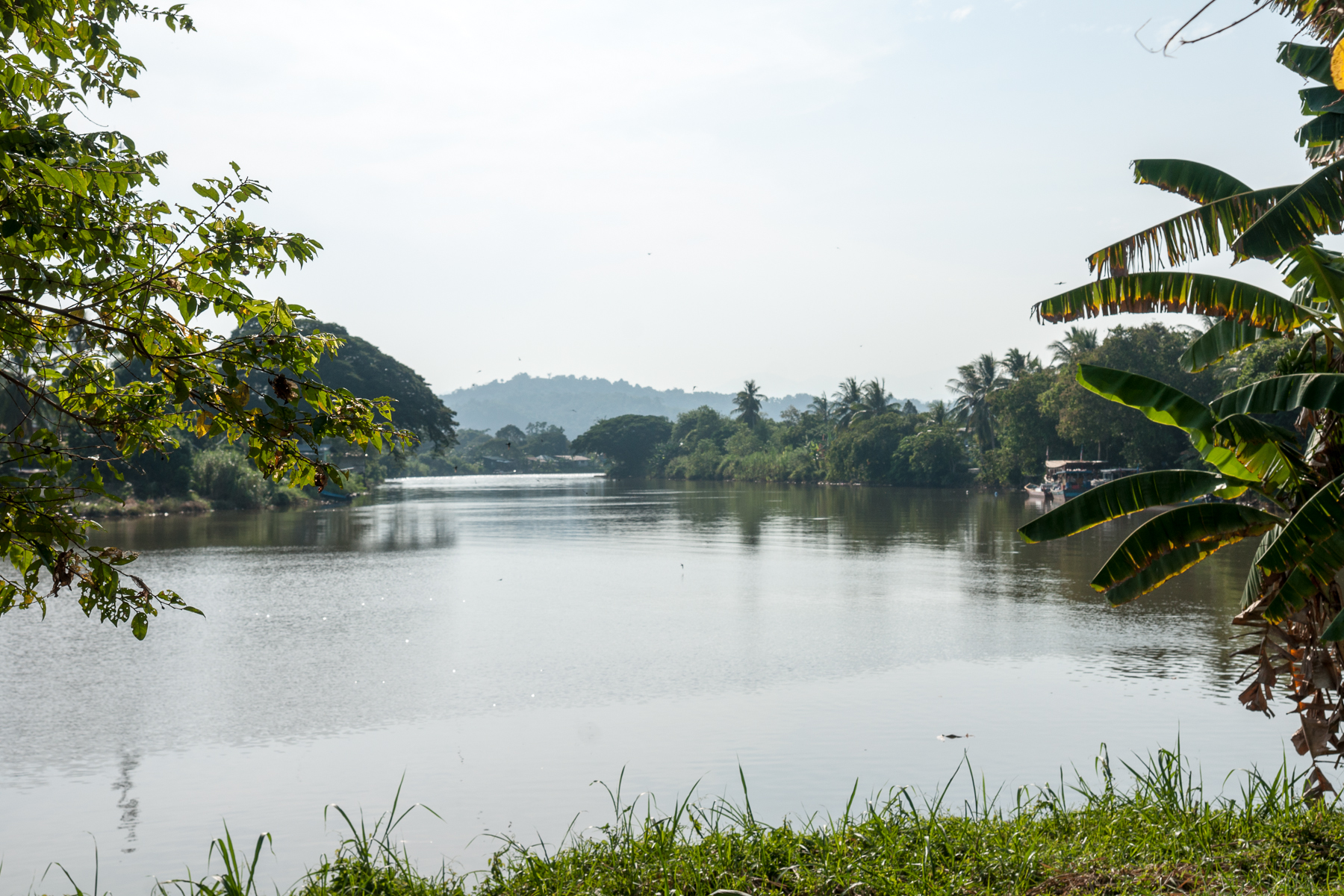
- View of the river.
- Native name: Sungai Papar (Malay)

Location
- Country: Malaysia
- State: Sabah
- Division: West Coast Division
- Precise location: Northwestern Borneo

Physical characteristics
- Source
  - location: From mountains in Papar, Penampang and Tuaran Districts
- Mouth
  - location: At Papar District into South China Sea
  - coordinates: 5°45′08.6″N 115°54′29.9″E
  - elevation: Sea level
- Length: 60 km (37 mi)
- Basin size: 805 km^{2} (311 sq mi)
- Discharge
  - location: Near mouth
  - average: 1.53 km^{3}/a (48 m^{3}/s)

Basin features
- Progression: South China Sea
- River system: Papar River

The Papar River (Malay: Sungai Papar; Coastal Kadazan: Bavang Papar) is a river in West Coast Division, northwestern Sabah of Malaysia. It has a total length of 60 km (37 miles) from its headwaters in the mountains of northwest Sabah to its outlet at the South China Sea, northwest of Papar town. It originates in the mountains in the interior Papar, Penampang and Tuaran Districts, which form part of the Crocker Range system. This includes the areas of Babagon, Bonobukan, Buayan, Central Papar, Gramatoi, Himpangno, Kaiduan, Kalangan, Kawari, Kogopon, Lingan, Mandalipau, Marahang, Padawan, Terian, Tiku and Ulu Papar.

== History ==
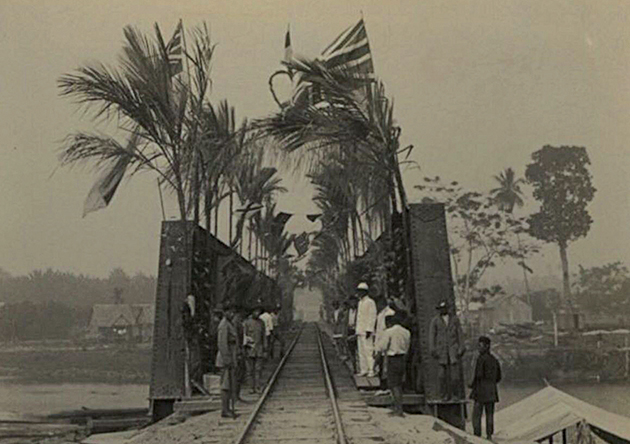
The opening of the Papar railway bridge passing through the river, c. 1915.

Through the era of the thalassocratic Bruneian Sultanate, the latter appointed Bruneian Malay nobility as the Sultan's representative in the interior and major rivers which includes the Papar River. Before the arrival of the North Borneo Chartered Company in the 19th century, the fertile valley around the river provide a sizeable farming community among the local indigenous. Through a survey conducted during the voyage of HMS Samarang (1822) under Edward Belcher along the northwestern coast of Borneo between 1843 and 1846, the British found the river mouth is located not far from Dinawan Island. The river become the transportation route for many Bruneian Malay and Kadazan villages situated along the river banks before bitumen roads and railway as a modern transportation networks being introduced by the British following their arrival. The small town of Papar owes its existence to the river after which it was named.

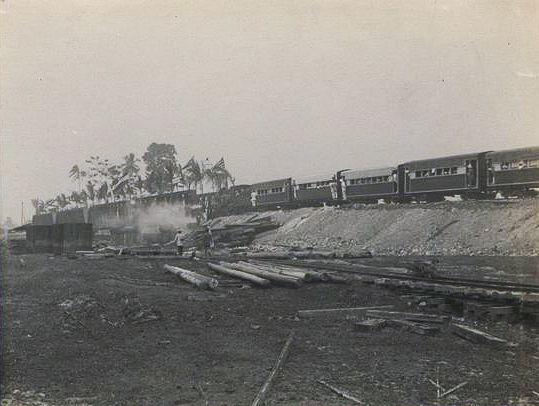
First North Borneo Railway train crossing a new bridge on the river near the present location of Papar town, c. 1915.

A first bridge for crossing the river was built in 1901 under the administration of the British together with other iron bridges in Kimanis and Membakut. However, it was swept by strong floods into the river where it was replaced with a new iron bridge but also damaged by another floods in 1903. A ferry service was temporarily made while the bridge undergoing repair. In 1904, another strong floods damaging the currently repaired bridge with most of its structure been swept away. A temporary bridge constructed in November 1908 also being swept away by floods. Finally in December 1908, a new bridge was constructed but again damaged by floods in 1913. In 1915, the railway service finally make its way to the Papar town with the opening of a railway bridge.

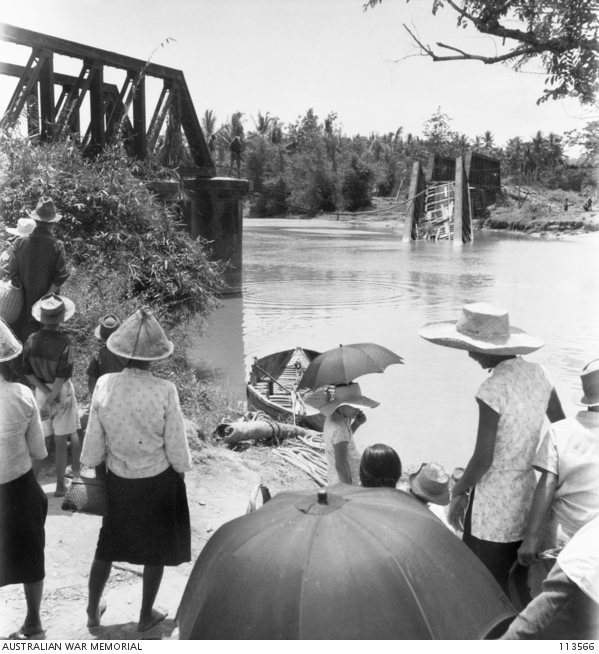
The wrecked railway bridge, 1945.

During the World War II, the railway bridge was however destroyed by Allied bombings to prevent it being used by the Japanese with the site also becoming one of the area where the Imperial Japanese Army surrendering to the Australian Imperial Force. After the end of the war, the locals need to use small boats to transport people and goods on the other side of the river without the bridge. A new bridge was later constructed although many rumours began to spread around at the time before the bridge construction that to ensure a successful construction of its structure, human heads must be buried at the foundation of the bridge with many locals believed that head hunters would be sent out to look for victims at night that causing everyone to be vigilant.

Since the existent of the railway bridge, another bridge for vehicle was located beside the rail bridge. Since the 2010s, there have been persistent calls to refurbish the bridge since its present condition is unable to afford large traffic which causing daily traffic congestion among Papar residents and people from other places. Another bridge called the Salleh Sulong Bridge which will be replaced by a newer bridge as part of the Pan Borneo Highway project is located in Old Papar Road at 5°41′38″N 115°59′15″E. The bridge is supported by newer concrete bridge which has been opened in 2018.

== Conservation efforts ==
Much of the river is covered by mangrove palm and swamps and that providing natural coastal protection and habitat for several bird species. Since the 2000s, the coasts of the river was affected by sand mining activities with 11 identified locations. Beginning in the 2010s, the Sabah government through the Lands and Surveys Department (LSD) began to increase operation against illegal sand mining in Papar as well on Tuaran River.

== Features ==
The river is among the largest in terms of water discharge other than Kinabatangan and Padas rivers. It is important as the source of freshwater fish and providing water for agriculture activities of the villagers as well commercial farms along the river and for Papar town respectively.

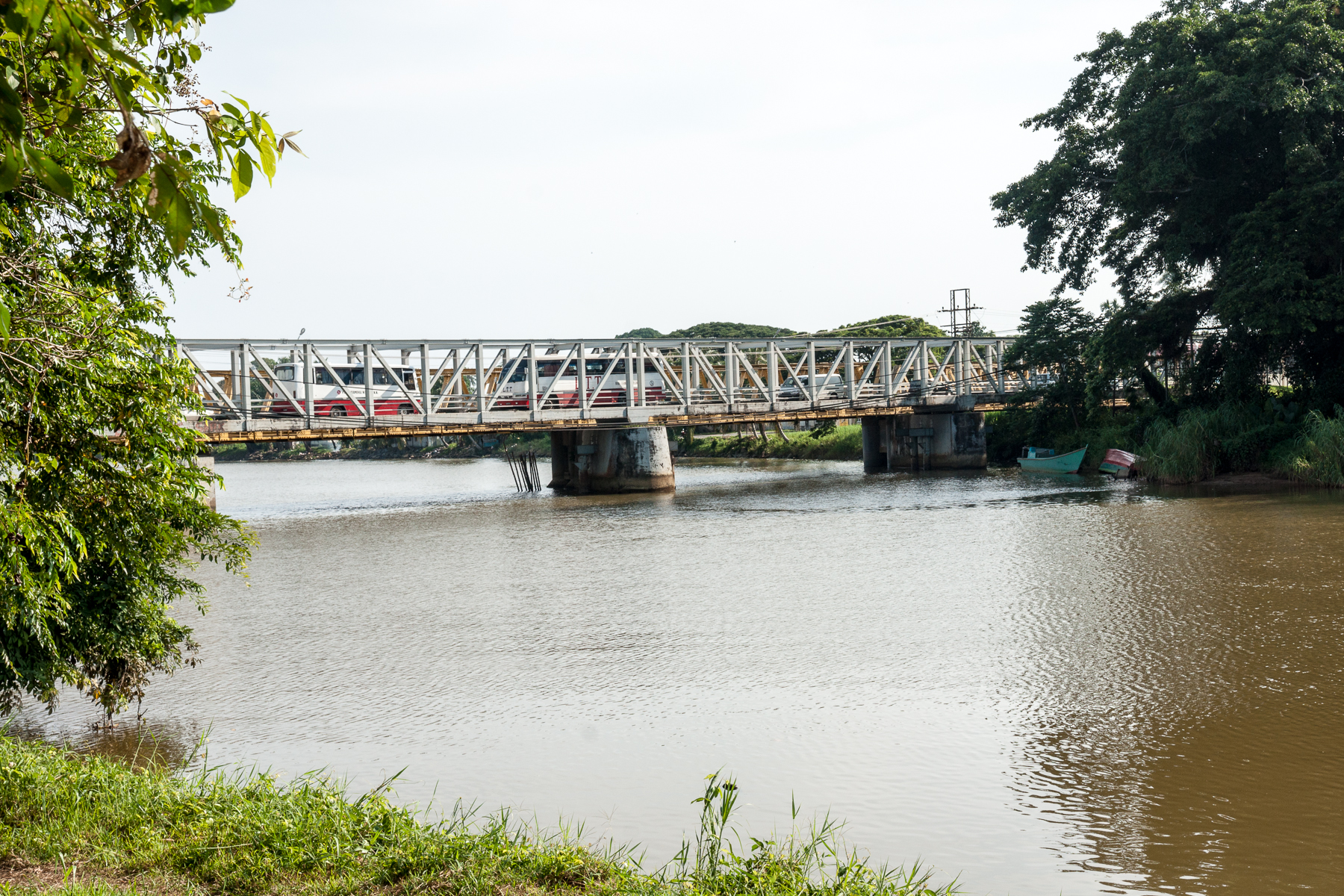
Vehicle bridge beside the oldest railway bridge.

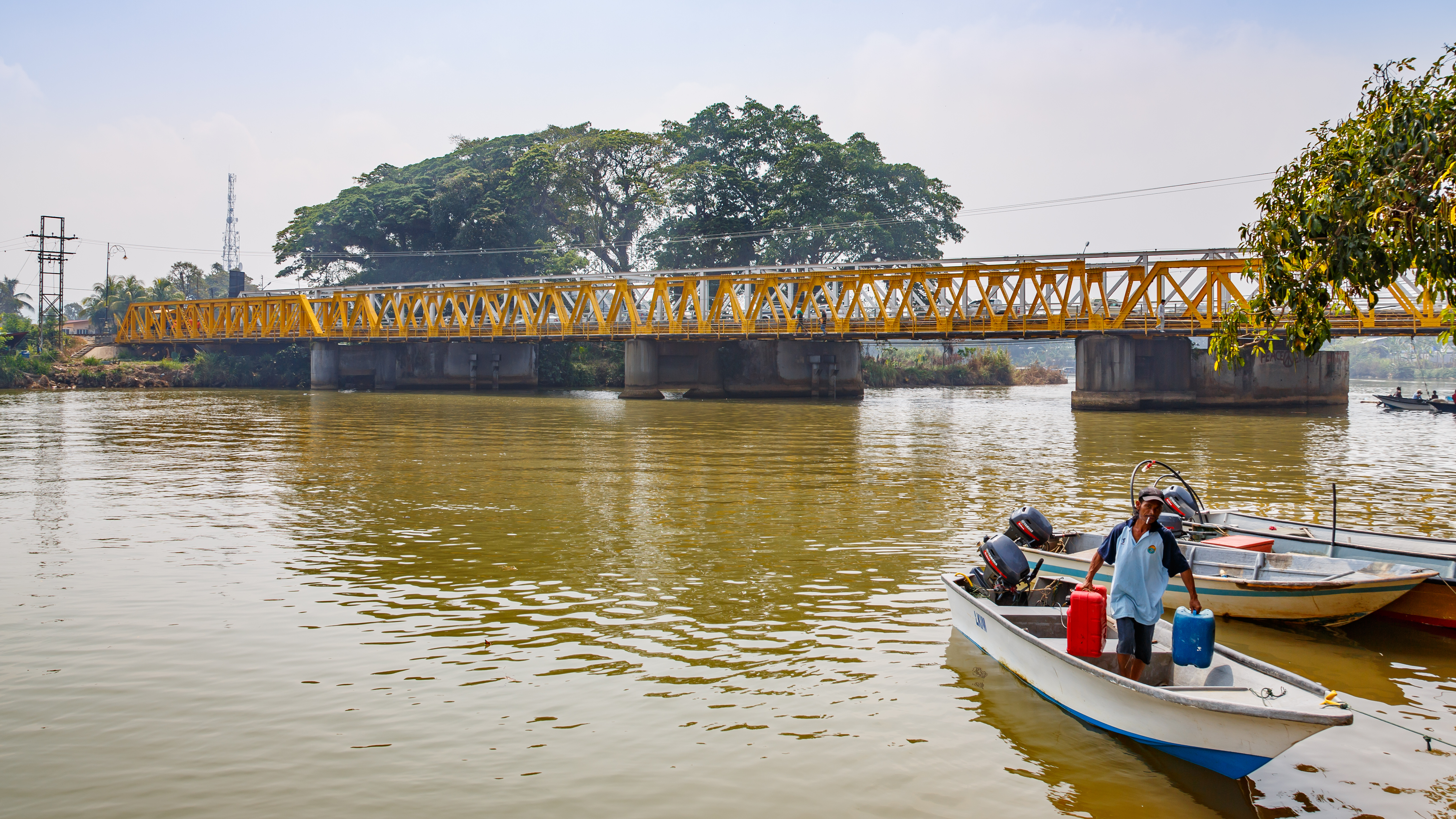
Fishermen unloading supplies from their boat in the river.

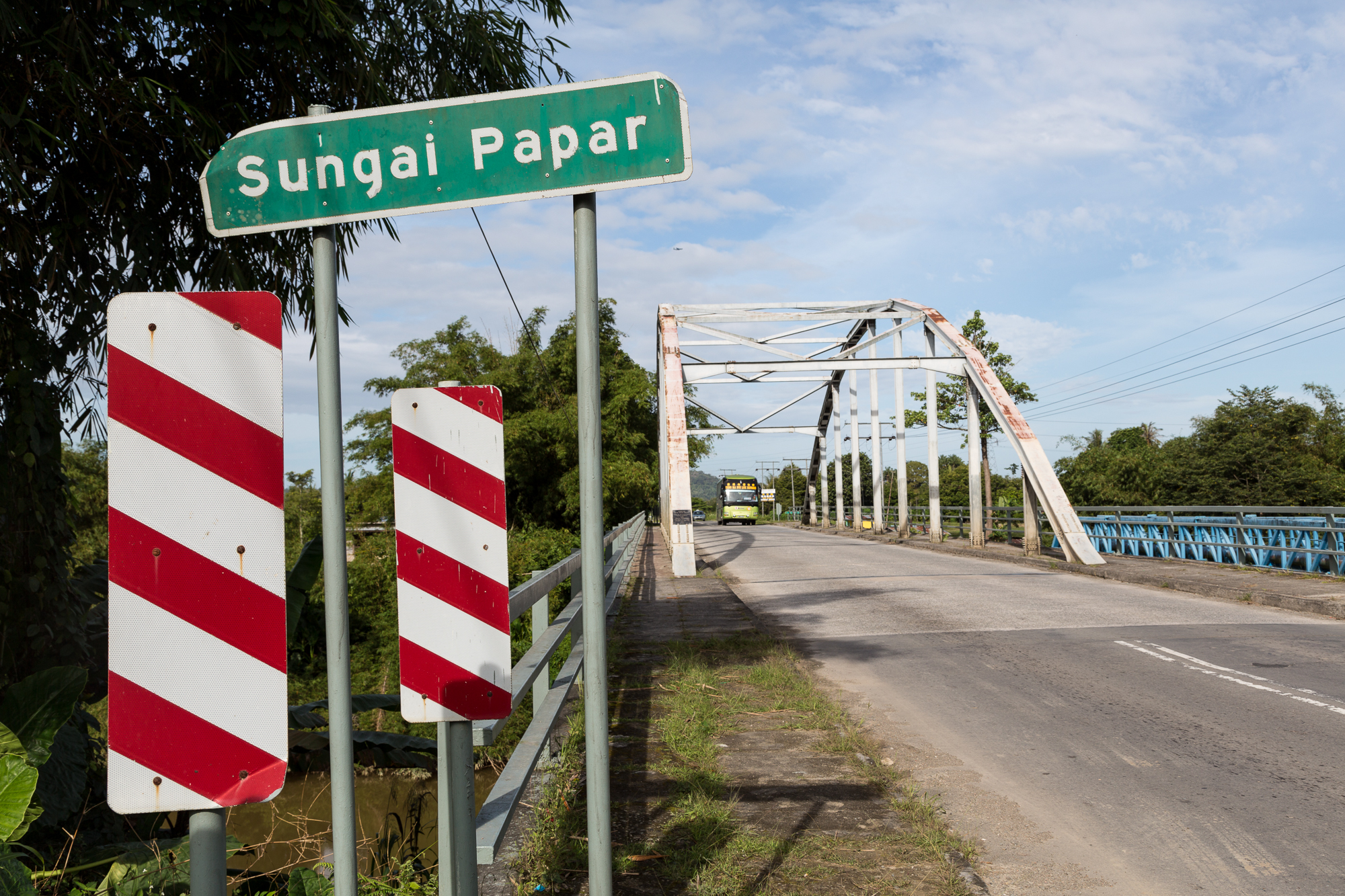
Signboard of the river name on the Salleh Sulong Bridge (replaced with new structure, estimated to be completed in 2020).

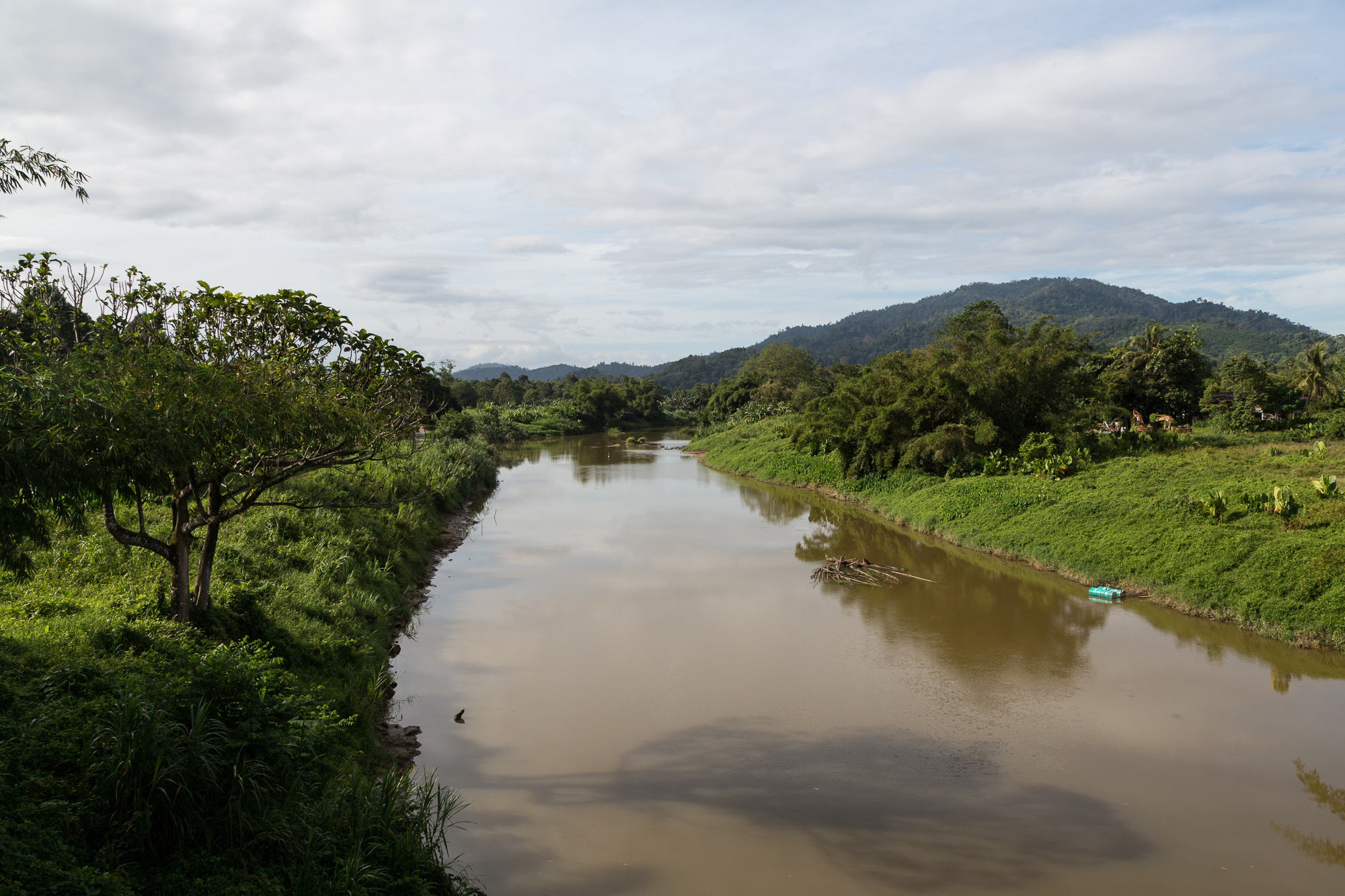
The river seen from the Salleh Sulong Bridge.

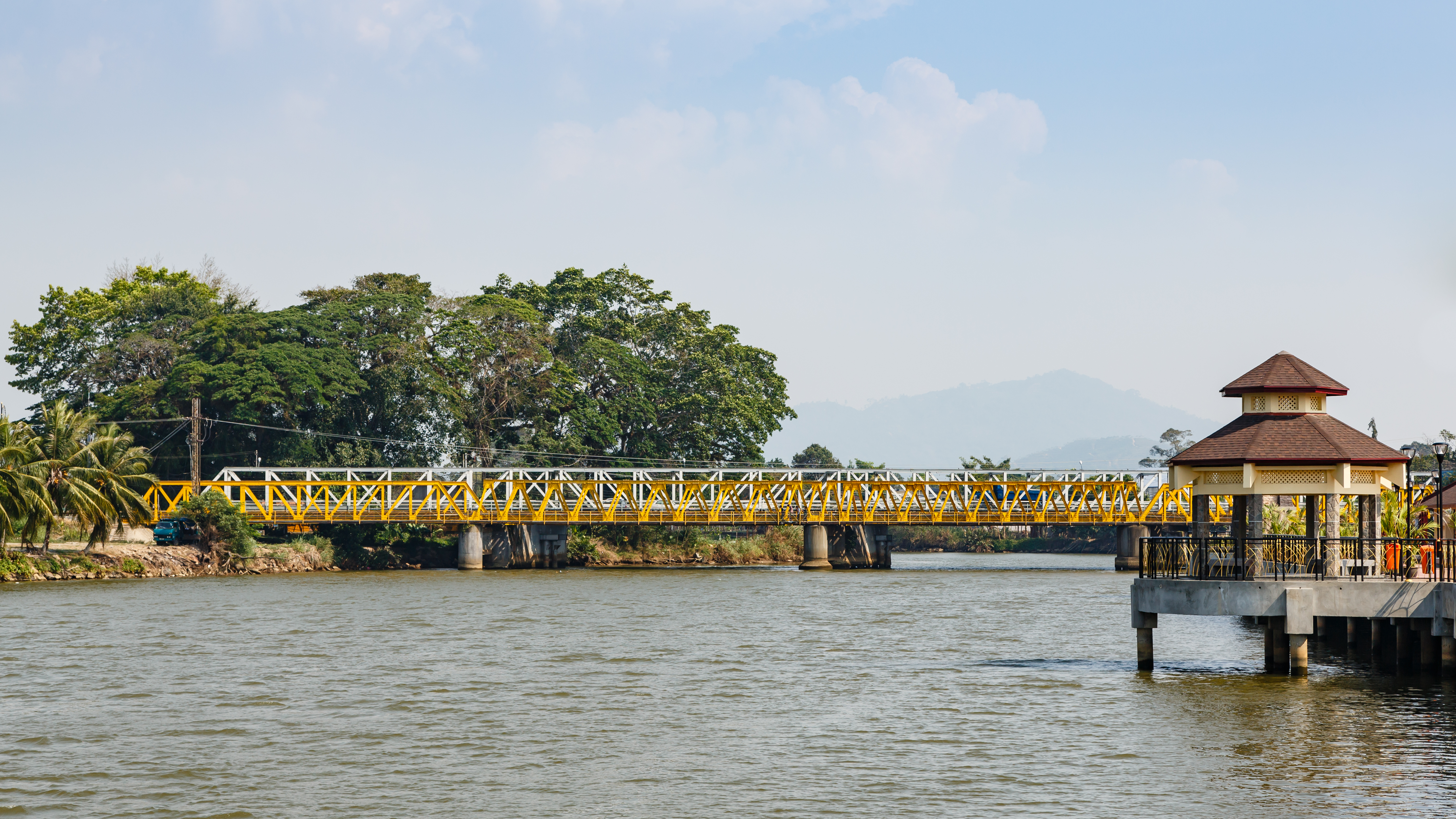
The railway bridge (in yellow) as seen today beside another bridge for vehicle.

== See also ==
- List of rivers of Malaysia
