= Liwagu River =

River in Sabah, Malaysia

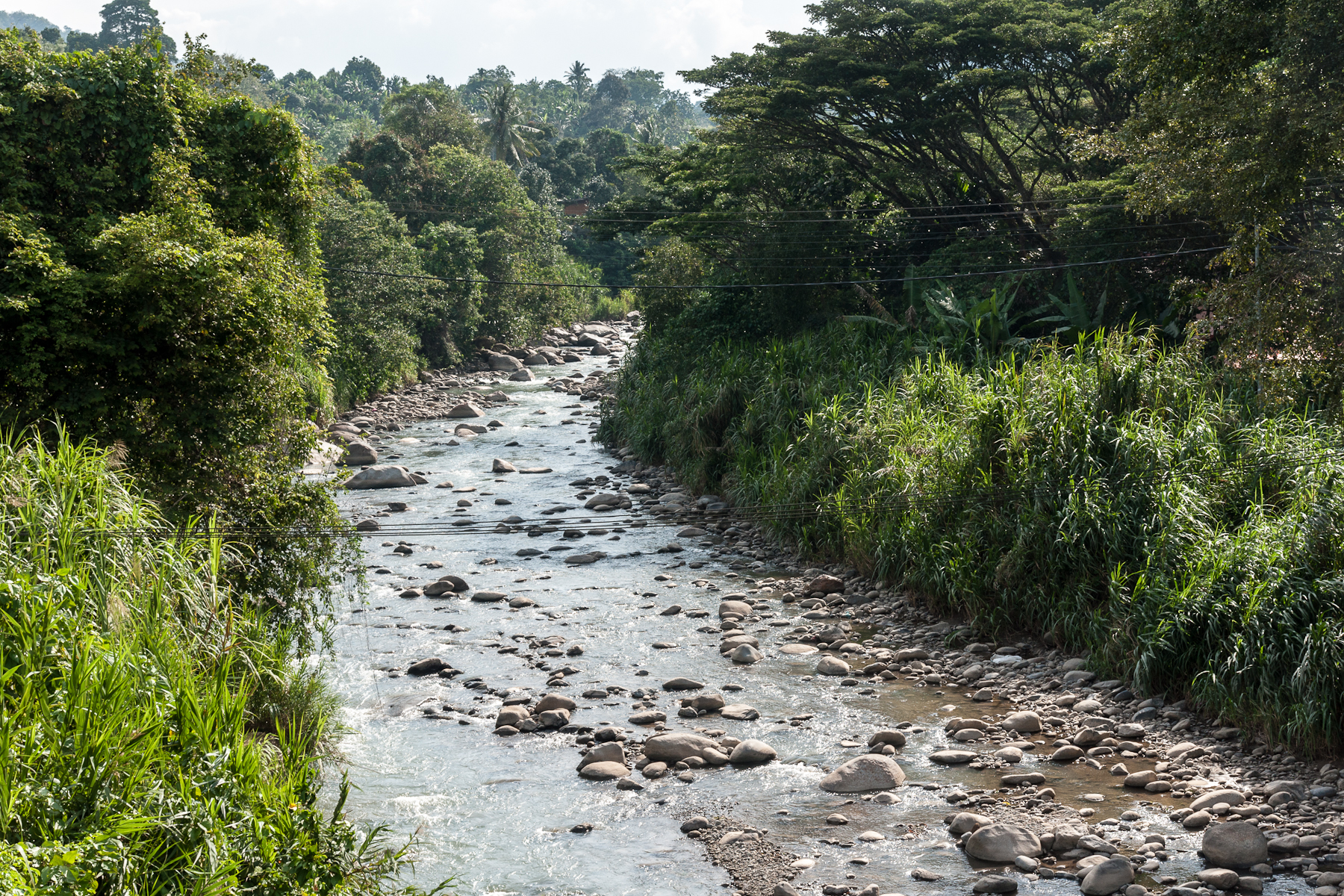
- View of the river.
- Native name: Bawang Liwagu (Kadazan Dusun)

Location
- Country: Malaysia
- State: Sabah
- Division: West Coast Division
- Precise location: Central northern Borneo

Physical characteristics
- Source
  - location: From the southern slopes of Mount Kinabalu in Ranau District
  - coordinates: 5°59′38.9″N 116°34′09.9″E
- Mouth
  - location: Towards Labuk River at Telupid District into Sulu Sea
  - coordinates: 5°53′18.4″N 117°30′02.3″E
  - elevation: Sea level
- Length: 200 km (120 mi)

Basin features
- River system: Mount Kinabalu

The Liwagu River (Malay: Sungai Liwagu, Kadazan Dusun: Bawang Liwagu) is a river in West Coast Division of Sabah, Malaysia, flowing eastwards off the southern slope of Mount Kinabalu into the Labuk River in Sandakan Division. Most parts of the river are covered by primary and secondary forests.

== Conservation efforts ==
The river is home to various habitat including plant, bird as well as insect species. Its trail in Mount Kinabalu National Park is considered to be a preeminent birder's trail. The trail varies between open vistas and dense thickets, but is predominantly open, skirting the ridge-top as it goes along the north side of the river gorge. Some of the bird species include chlamydochaera jefferyi, chlorocharis emiliae emiliae, eumyias indigo cerviniventris, harpactes whiteheadi, megalaima pulcherrima, napothera crassa Luzon and zosterops atricapilla. Several insects species such as the graphelmis bandukanensis, liparthum, stalk-eyed fly (teleopsis) and myrmarachne mariaelenae also found within the river. The intensive agricultural activities in Kundasang Valley area near the upstream of the river basin however has causing problems concerning the river water quality.

== Features ==
The river is among the destination for water rafting activities in Sabah aside from Kiulu (which is in turn a tributary of the Tuaran River) and the Padas Rivers.

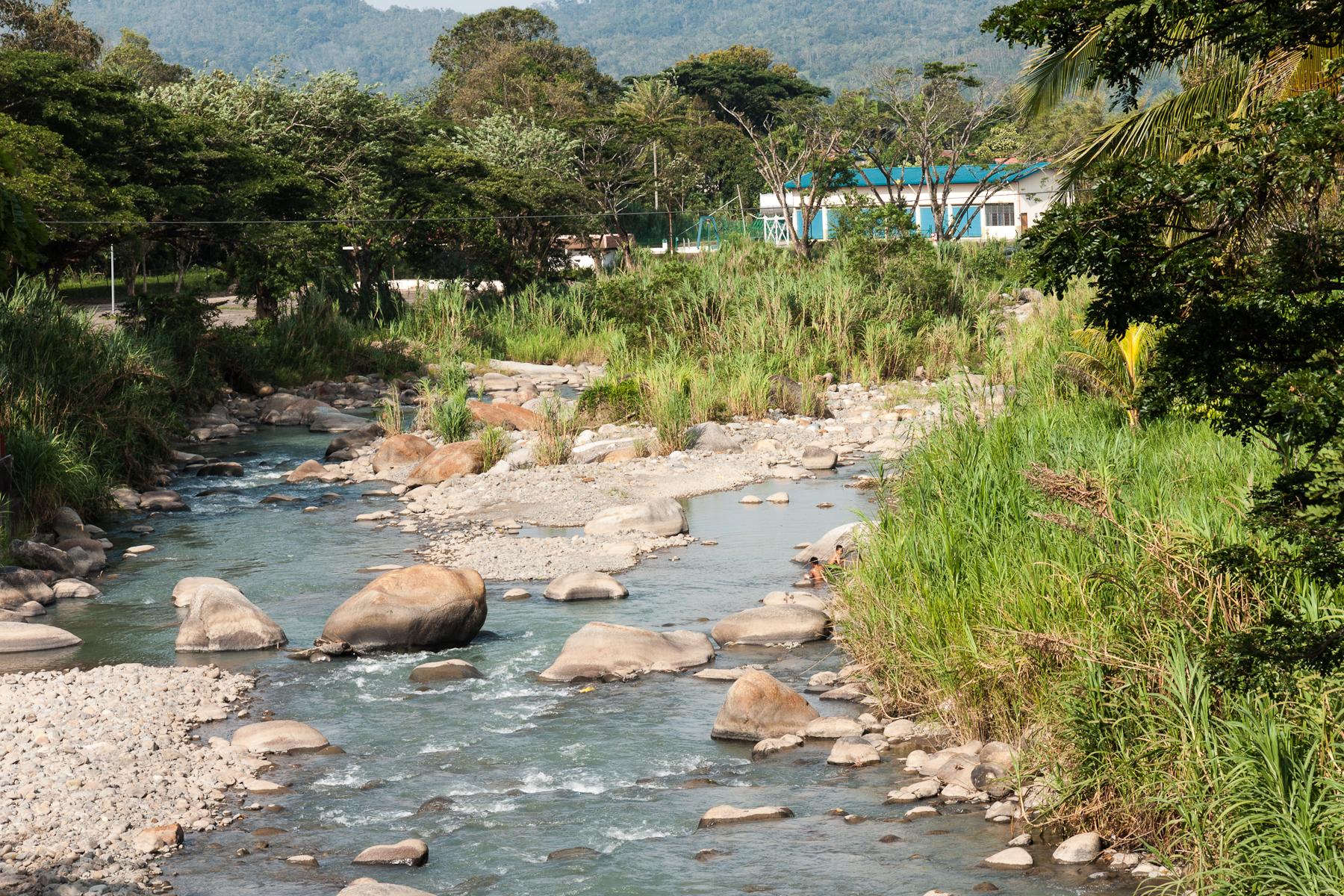
Rocks in the river.

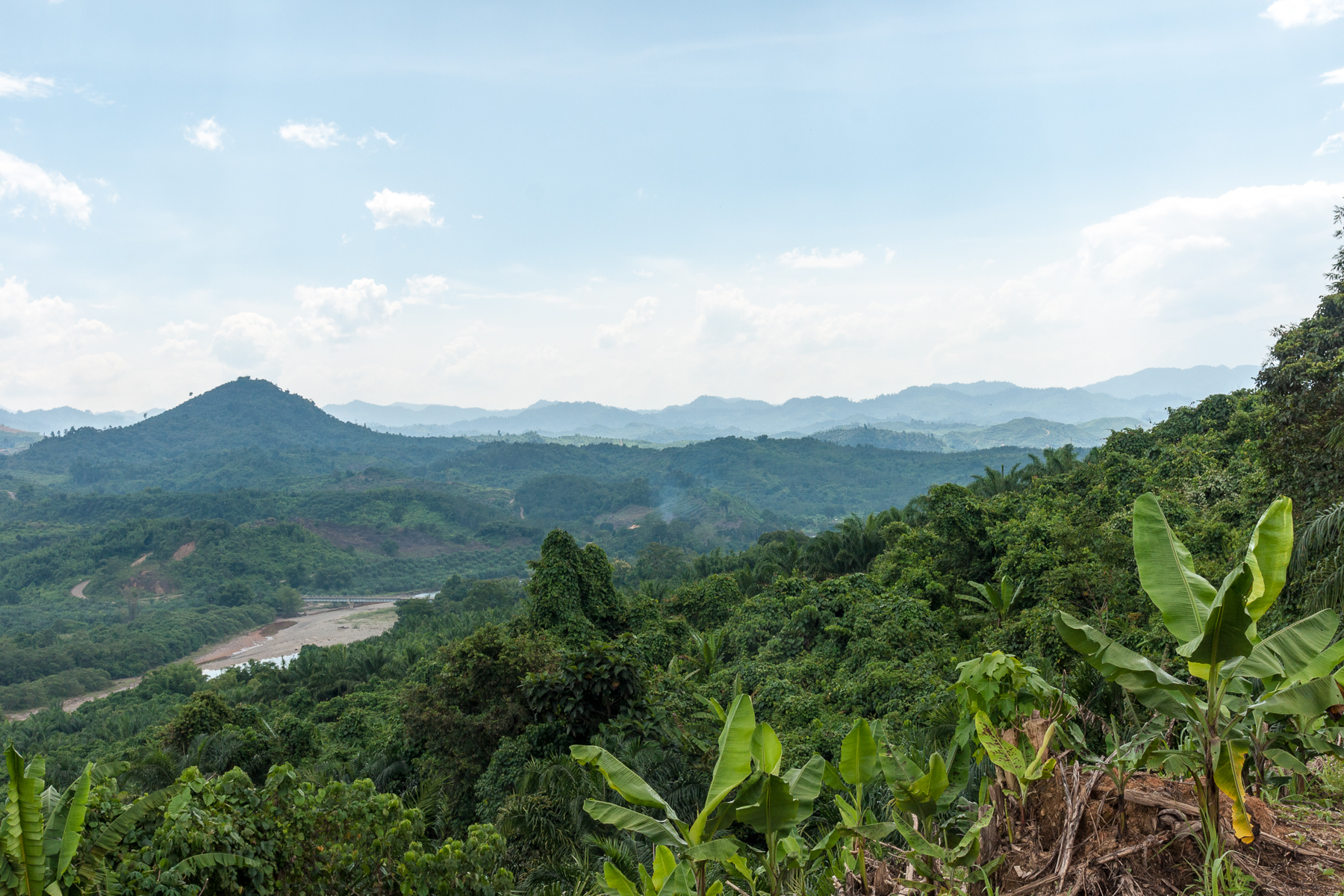
The mountainous area around the river.

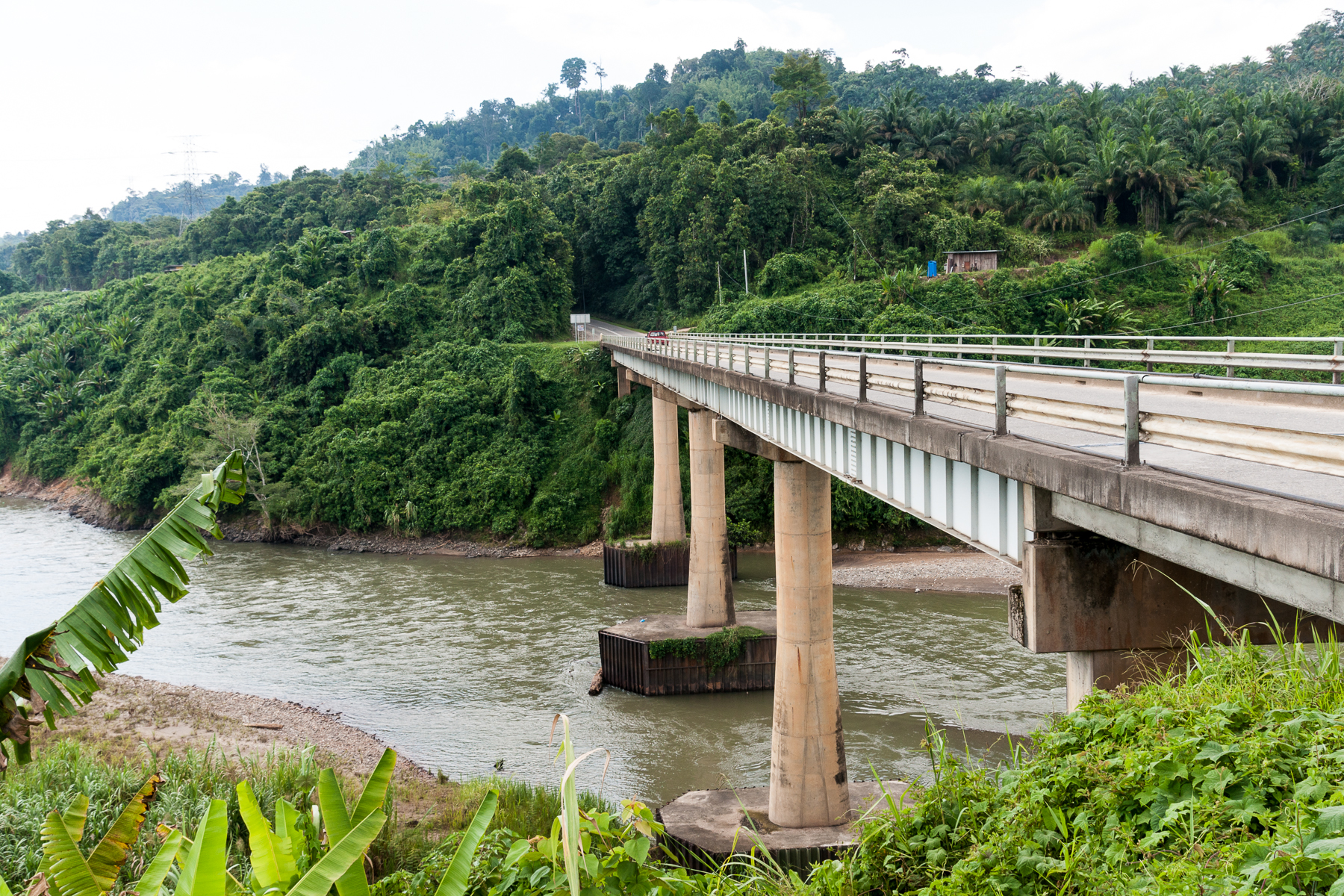
The river as seen near a bridge.

== See also ==
- List of rivers of Malaysia
