= Kuyoh River =

River in Kuala Lumpur, Malaysia

Kuyoh River in Seri Kembangan, Selangor

The Kuyoh River (Malay: Sungai Kuyoh) is a river in Kuala Lumpur, Malaysia.

== See also ==
- List of rivers of Malaysia
