= Rompin River =

River in Pahang, Malaysia

- Native name: Sungai Rompin (Malay)

Location
- Country: Malaysia
- State: Pahang

Physical characteristics
- Mouth
  - coordinates: 2°49′N 103°29′E

Rompin River (Malay: Sungai Rompin) is a river in the Malaysian state of Pahang. It flows through southeastern Pahang before emptying into the South China Sea.

== See also ==
- List of rivers of Malaysia
