= Maong River =

River in Sarawak, Malaysia

Coordinates: 1°32′37″N 110°18′30″E

The Maong River (Malay: Sungai Maong) is a river in Sarawak, Malaysia. It is a tributary of the Sarawak River, joining it about half a kilometer from the city center of Kuching, the capital city of the state of Sarawak.

== See also ==
- List of rivers of Malaysia
