= Crocker Mountains =

Mountain range in Sabah, Malaysia

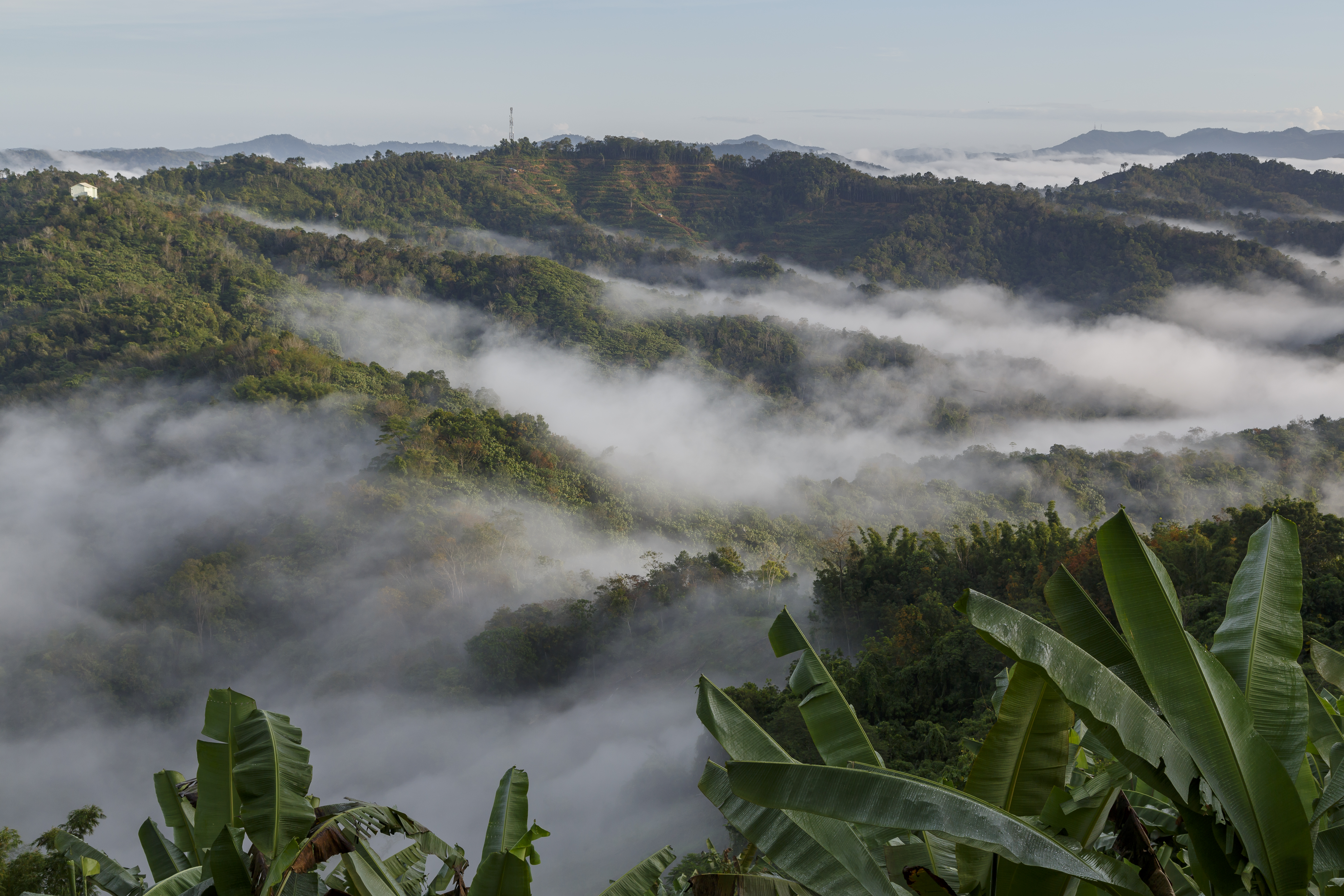
- Crocker Mountains as seen from Ranau–Tamparuli Road

Highest point
- Peak: Mount Kinabalu
- Elevation: 4,095 m (13,435 ft)
- Coordinates: 5°45′N 116°30′E

Naming
- Etymology: William Maunder Crocker
- Native name: Banjaran Crocker (Malay)

Geography
- Location within Malaysia
- Country: Malaysia
- State: Sabah
- Region: West Coast, Interior and Kudat divisions
- Districts: Keningau, Papar, Penampang, Ranau, Tambunan, Kota Belud, Kota Marudu, Tuaran and Kota Kinabalu

The Crocker Mountains (Malay: Banjaran Crocker) form a range that separates the West Coast and Interior divisions of Sabah, Malaysia. At an average height of 1,800 metres (5,906 ft), it is the highest mountain range in the state. It is named after a 19th century British administrator of North Borneo, William Maunder Crocker.

== Geology ==
The mountain range is made up of uplifted and folded sedimentary rocks consisting of weathered soft sandstones and shales. The highest point is Mount Kinabalu at 4,095 metres (13,435 ft) . Most of the park boundary lies above 300 metres (984 ft) with its lowlands used for cash crops and paddy field. On the eastern side of the mountain range lies the Tambunan Valley at 800 metres (2,625 ft) which is mainly terraced paddy fields, and groves of bamboo border the north-eastern part of the protected park. The park area is important as a water catchment to supply water to various rivers in the west coast and interior districts of Sabah including the Papar River, the Kimanis River, the Bongawan River, the Membakut River, the Padas River and the Melalap River that flow west to the park while the Pegalan River, the Pampang River, the Apin-Apin River, the Tendulu River, the Melalap River, the Liawan River and the Tikalod River flow in the opposite direction.

== History ==
The area surrounding Mount Kinabalu has been a state park since 1964 and was the country's first World Heritage Site. Part of the mountain range has been gazetted for protection as Crocker Range National Park since 1984. Through the Bornean Biodiversity and Ecosystems Conservation Programme (BBEC), a technical co-operation existed between the government of Sabah and the Japan International Cooperation Agency (JICA) to innovate the Community Use Zone (CUZ) concept as a management option to address the issues concerning indigenous communities living and utilising resources within the protected areas. Mount Kinabalu, one of the highest mountains in Southeast Asia, is a part of this mountain range. In 2014, the range was recognised as a UNESCO Biosphere Reserve, becoming the second Malaysian site to be so designated, after Chini Lake in the state of Pahang on the peninsular side. The mountain region is also known as the traditional homeland for the various Dusunic subgroups within northern Borneo.

== Biodiversity ==
The Crocker Mountains Forest Reserve area has a wide range of floral and faunal diversity and has the highest diversity of nocturnal insects in all the 20 forest reserves surveyed within the Heart of Borneo area in Sabah; it has recorded a number of endemic species.

== Gallery ==
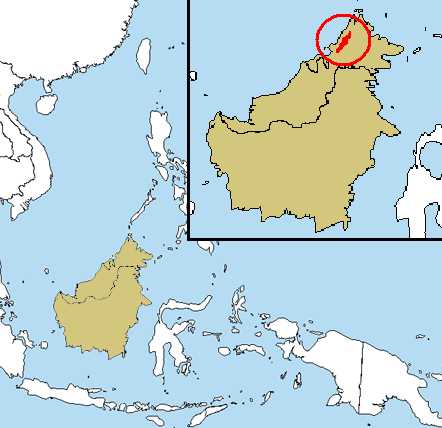
Map of the mountain range

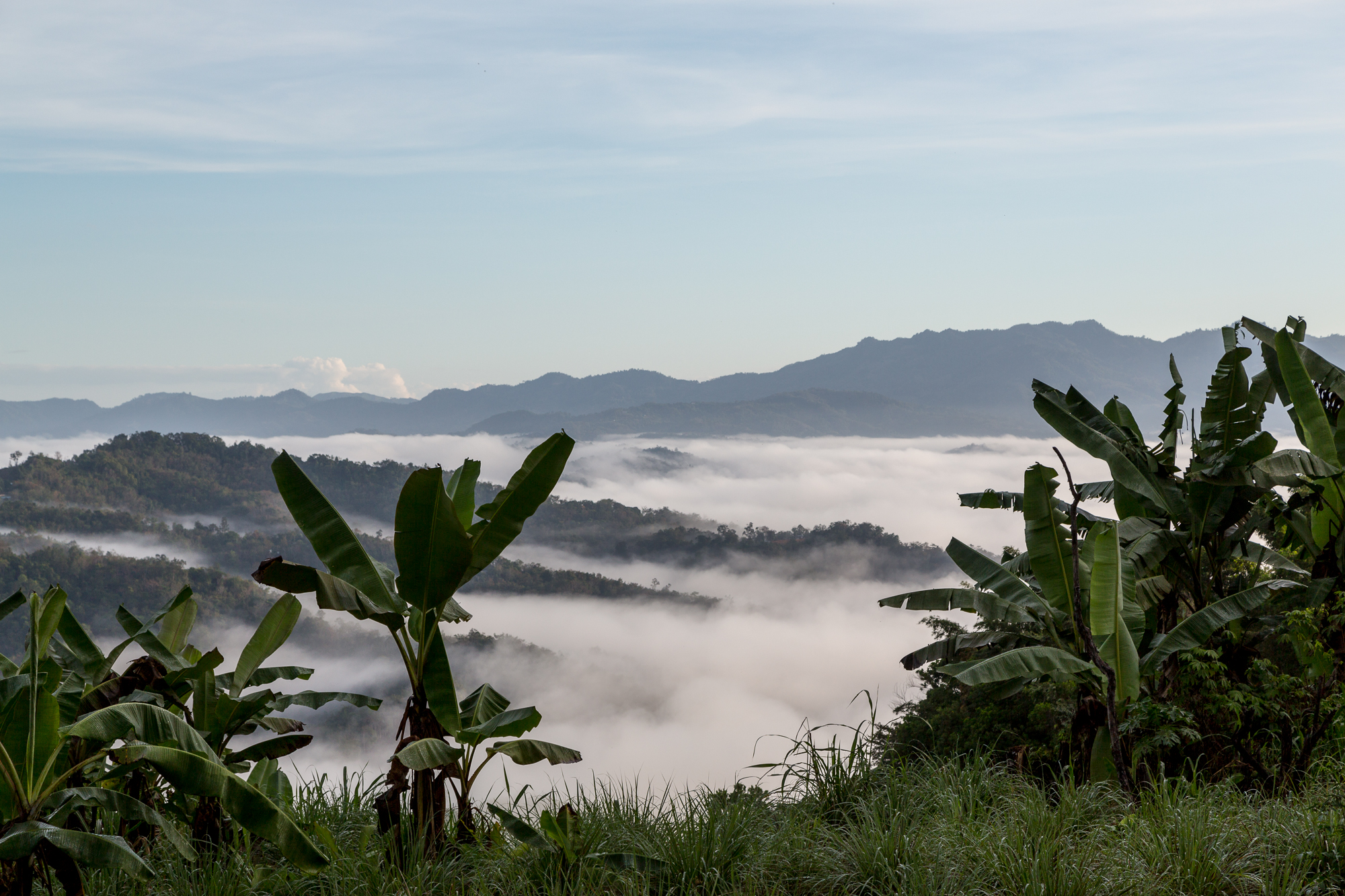
The mountain range with a sea of clouds

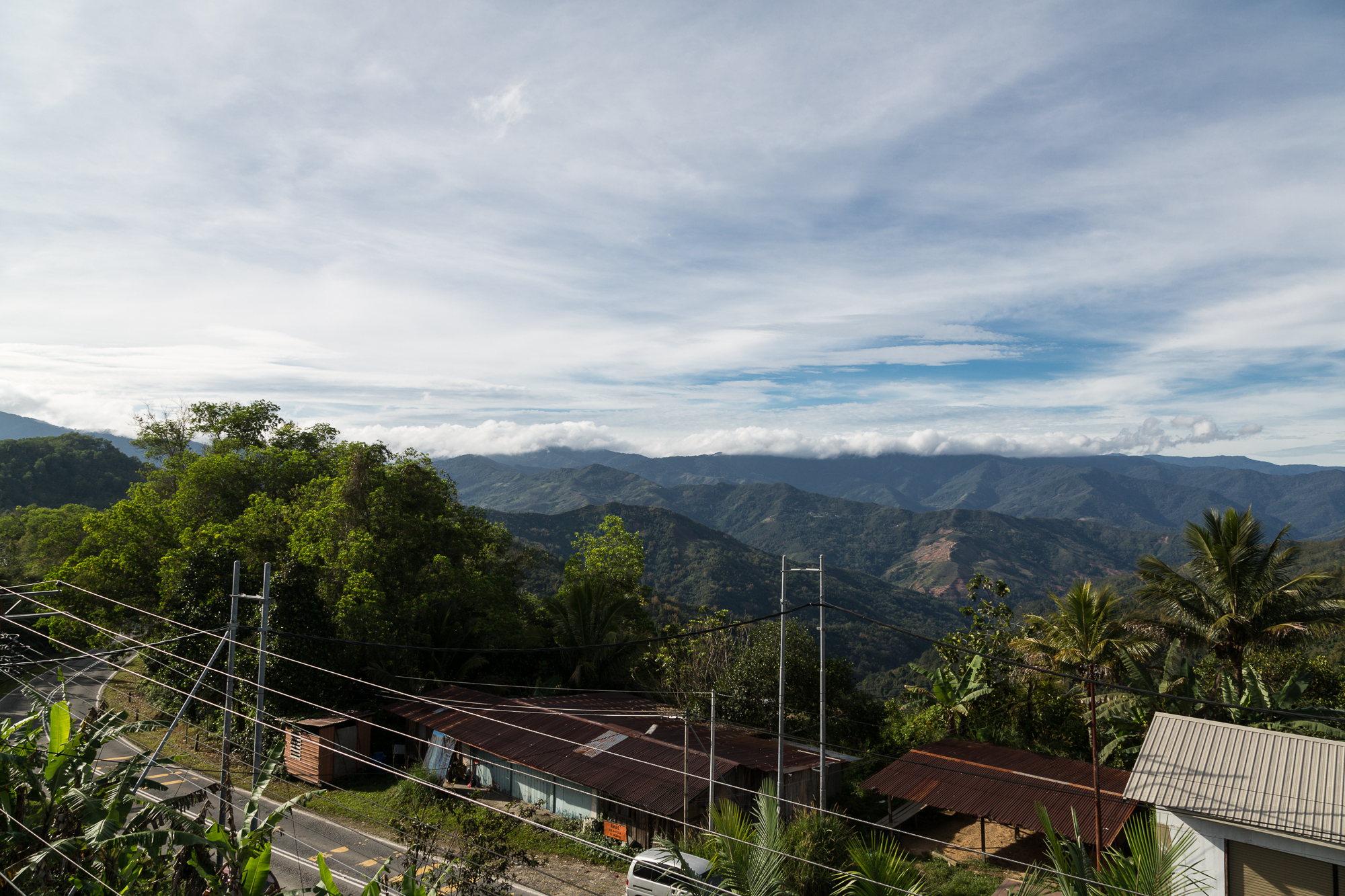
The mountain range as seen from Ranau District

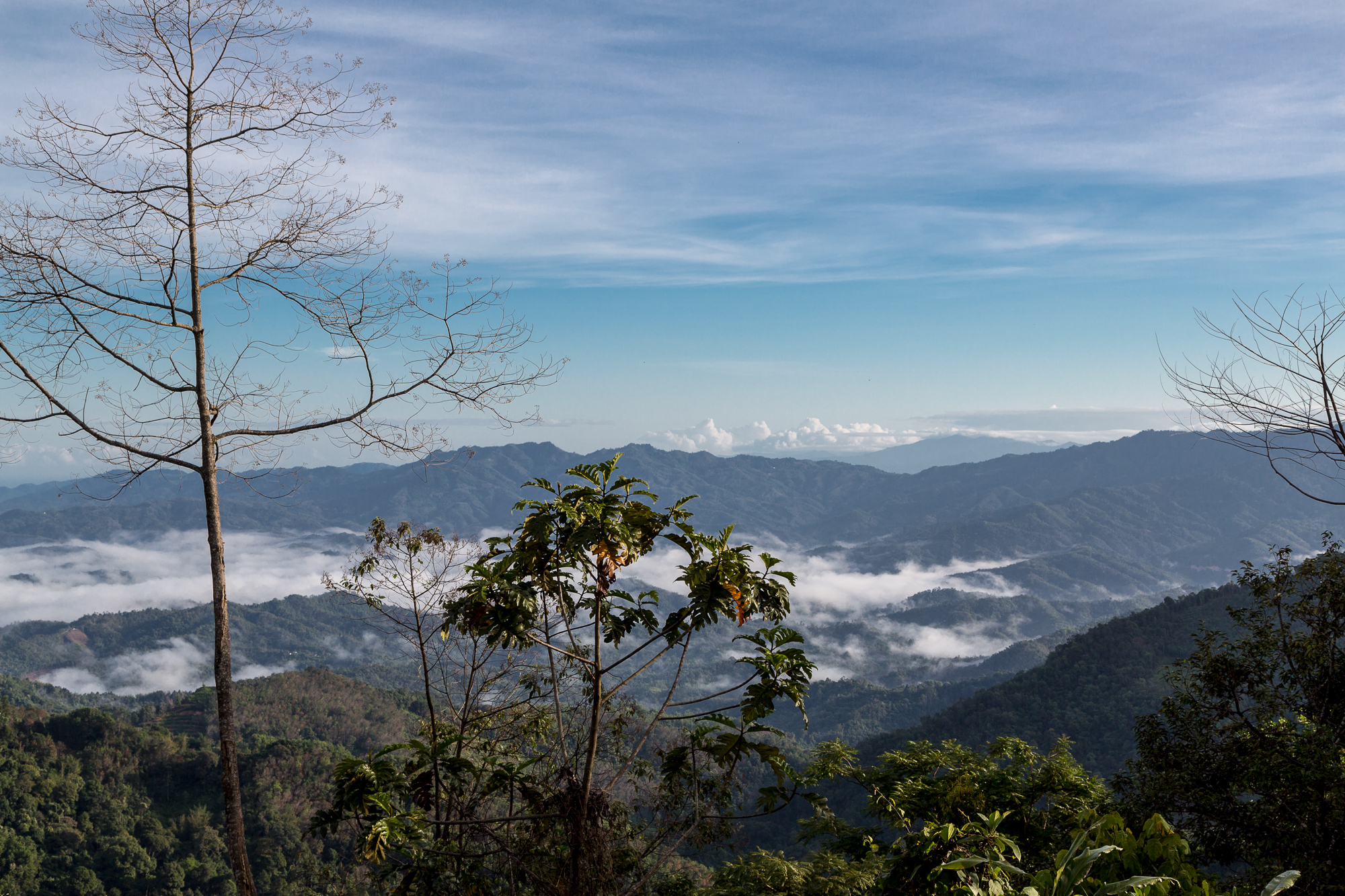
View of the mountain range from Ranau–Tamparuli Road

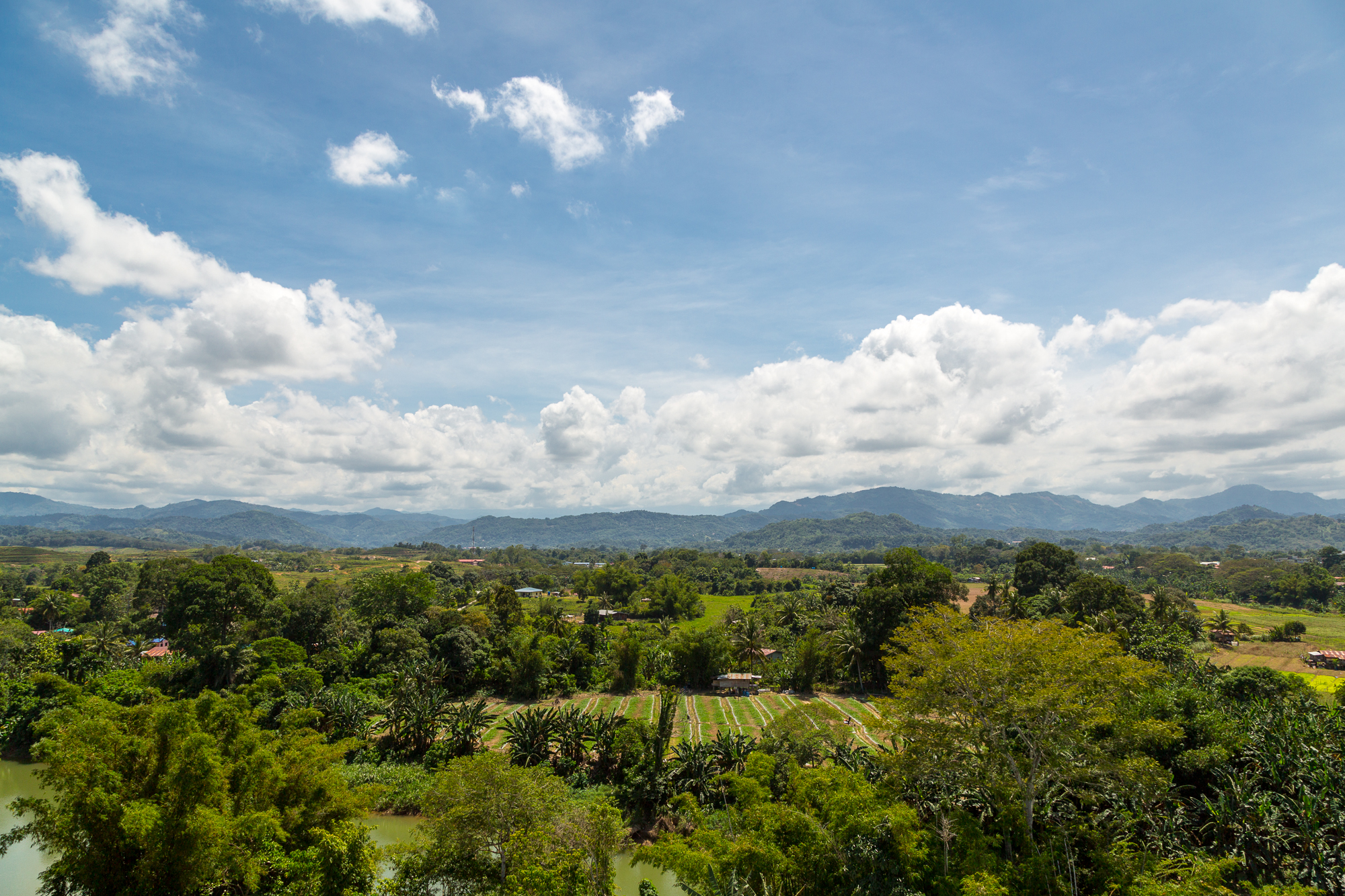
The mountain range as seen from Ling San Pagoda in Tuaran District
