= Kemena River =

River in Sarawak, Malaysia

Coordinates: 3°11′N 113°02′E

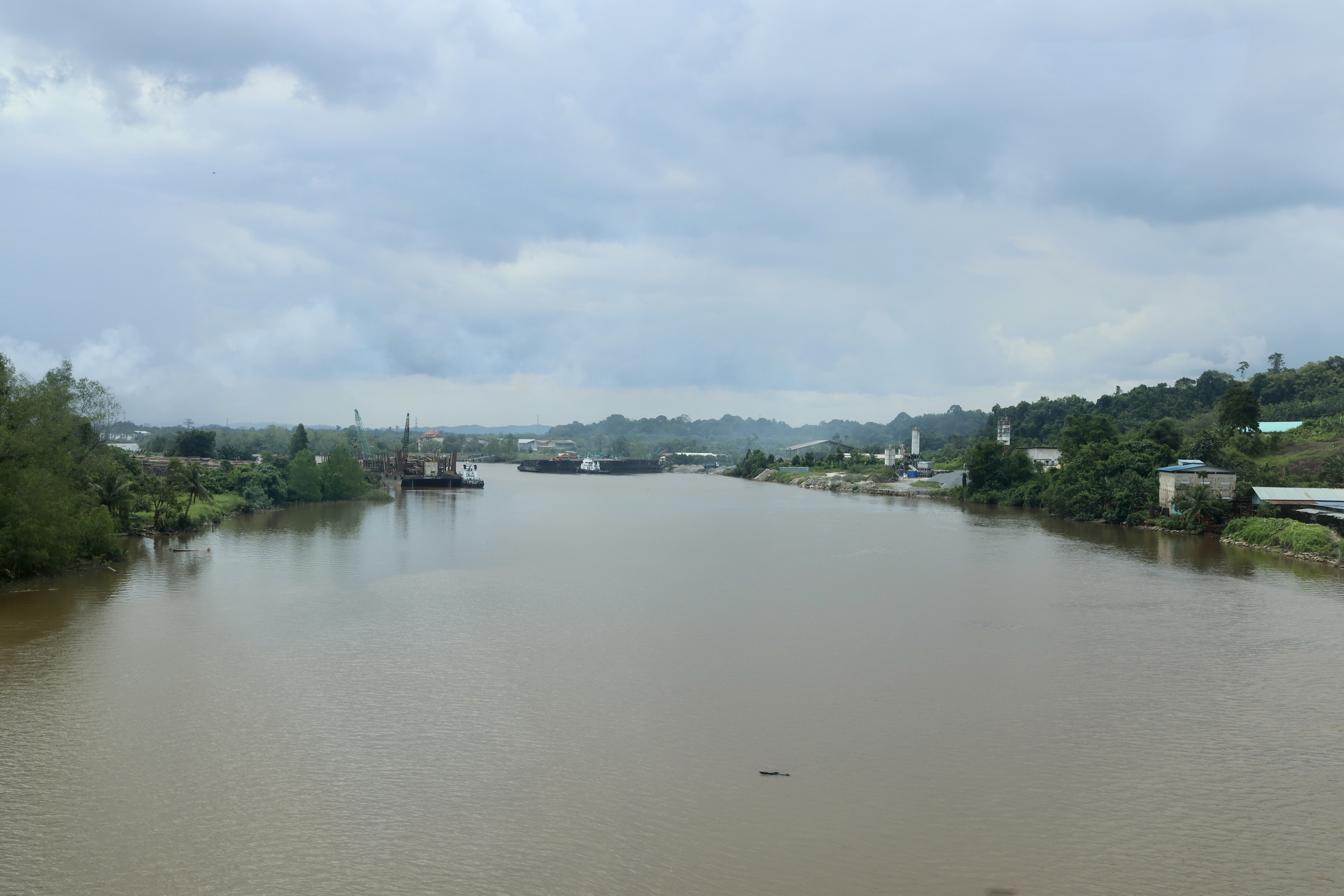
Kemena River seen from the Kemena Bridge in 2023.

The Kemena River (Malay: Sungai Kemena) is a river in Bintulu Division, Sarawak state, Malaysia. It flows past Sebauh and Bintulu, and is used for transporting timber and oil from the interior.

== See also ==
- List of rivers of Malaysia
