= Ampang River =

River in Selangor, Malaysia

- Native name: Sungai Ampang (Malay)

Location
- Country: Malaysia
- States: Selangor and Kuala Lumpur

Physical characteristics
- Source: Selangor, Malaysia
  - coordinates: 3°13′38″N 101°48′56″E
- 2nd source: Selangor, Malaysia
  - coordinates: 3°13′44″N 101°48′53″E
- Mouth: Klang River
  - location: Klang, Selangor
  - coordinates: 3°9′57″N 101°44′37″E
- Length: 27 km (17 mi)

The Ampang River (Malay: Sungai Ampang) is a river in Selangor, Malaysia, at approximate coordinates 3.15°N, 101.7667°W.

== See also ==
- List of rivers of Malaysia
