= Kemensah River =

River in Selangor, Malaysia

The Kemansah River (Malay: Sungai Kemensah) is a river in the state of Selangor in Malaysia.

== See also ==
- List of rivers of Malaysia
