= Santubong River =

River in Sarawak, Malaysia

Coordinates: 1.71361°N 110.31887°E

Santubong RIver
- Location within Malaysia

The Santubong River (Malay: Sungai Santubong) is a river in Sarawak, Malaysia. It flows from the Sarawak River north to the coastal city of Santubong [ms] where it empties into the South China Sea.

== See also ==
- List of rivers of Malaysia
