= Penchala River =

River in Selangor, Malaysia

The Penchala River (Malay: Sungai Penchala) is a river in Selangor, Malaysia. It runs from Kampung Sungai Penchala to Klang River near Petaling Jaya.

== See also ==
- List of rivers of Malaysia
