= Sitompok Bridge =

Sungai Sitompok Bridge Jambatan Sitompok
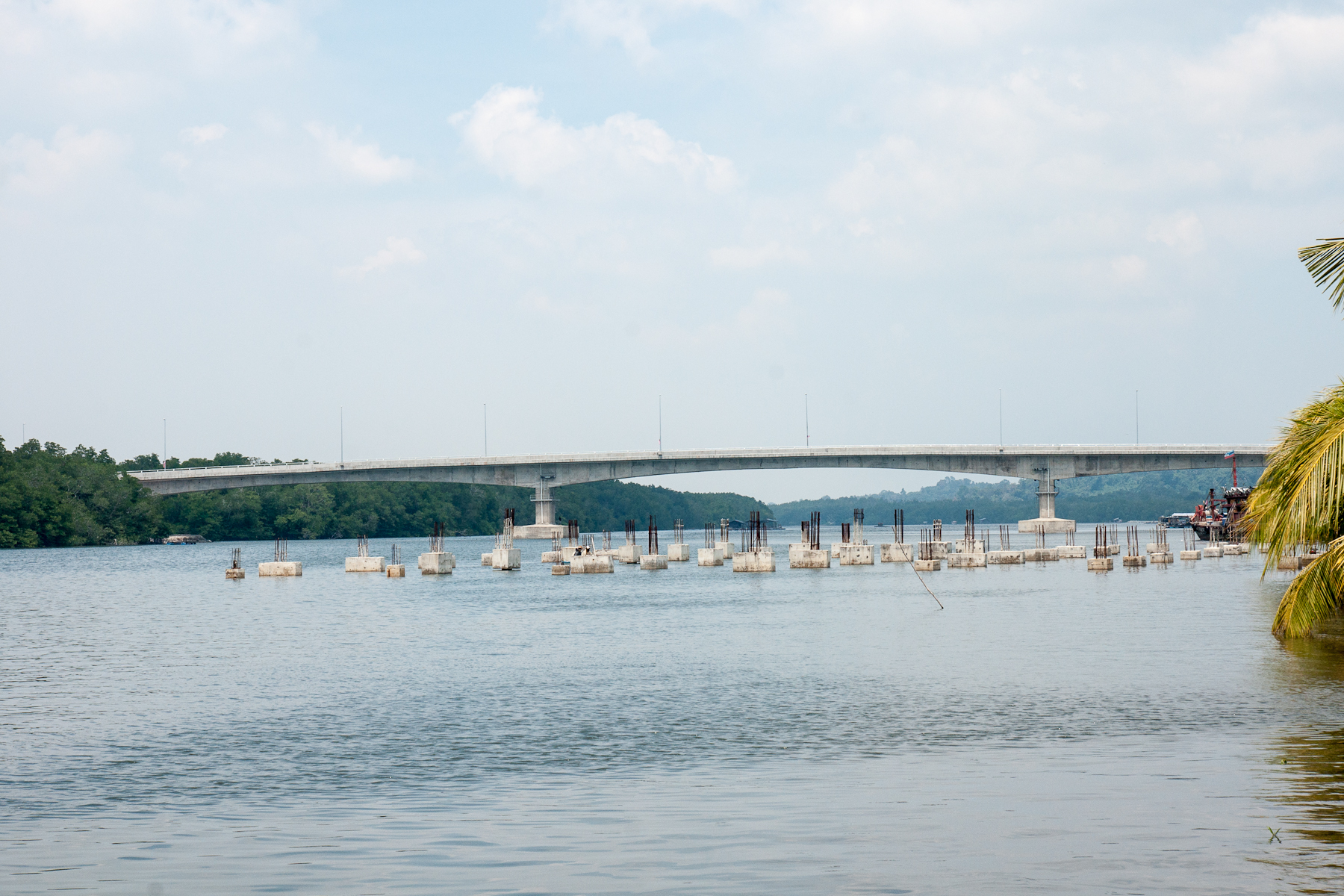
- Coordinates: 5°33′56″N 115°35′46″E
- Carries: Motor vehicles
- Crosses: Padas River
- Locale: SA71 Jalan Membakut
- Official name: Sitompok Bridge
- Maintained by: Sabah Public Works Department (JKR)

Characteristics
- Design: Arch box girder bridge
- Total length: 1.1 km

History
- Designer: State Government of Sabah; Sabah Public Works Department (JKR)
- Constructed by: Sabah Public Works Department (JKR)
- Opened: 2013

The Sitompok Bridge is a landmark bridge across Sitompok River in Kuala Penyu town in Interior Division, Sabah, Malaysia. It was constructed 2012-2013 at a cost of RM60,000,000.
