= Bintangor River =

River in Sarawak, Malaysia

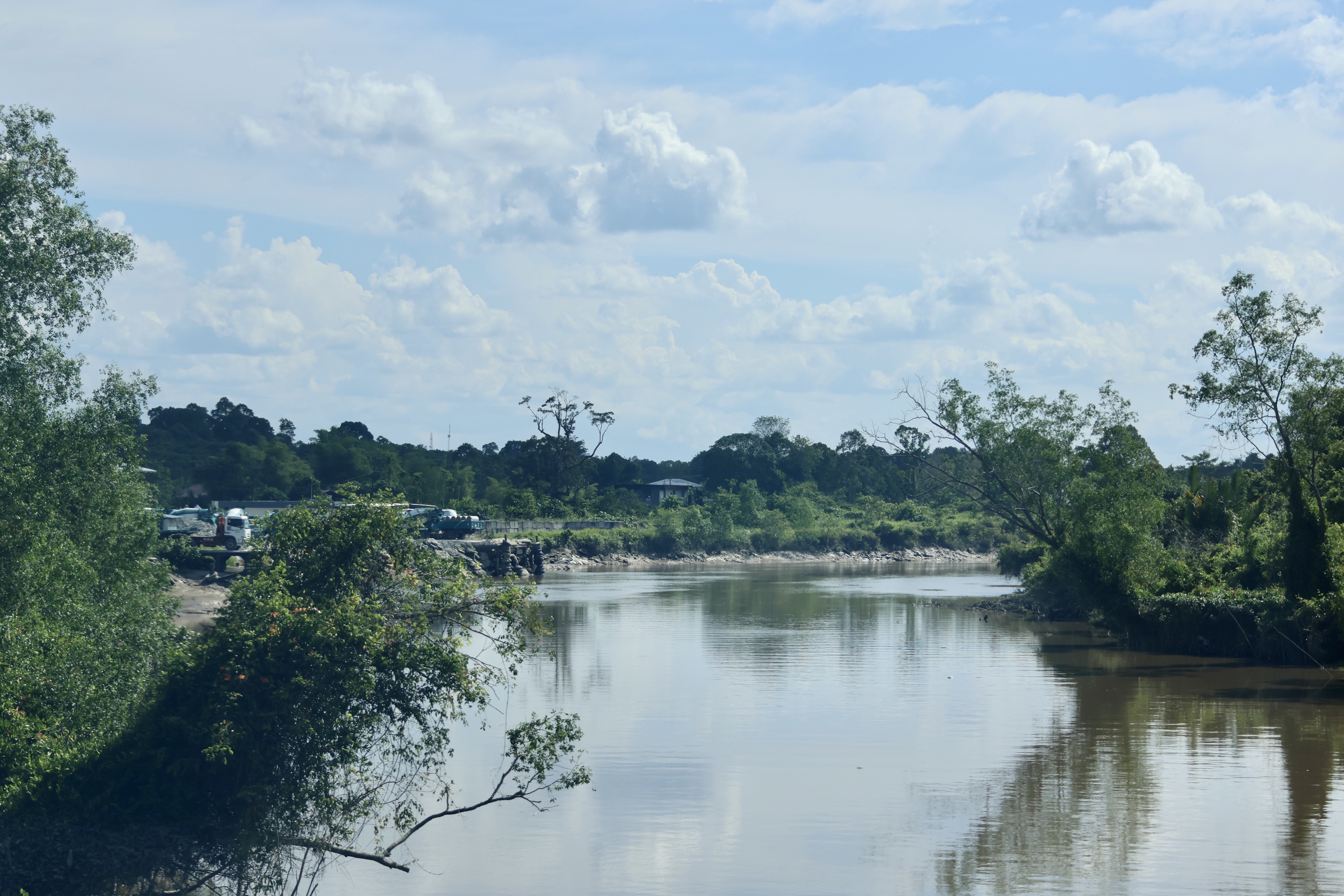
Photo of the Bintangor River

Bintangor River (Malay: Sungai Bintangor) is a river in Sarawak, Malaysia. It is a tributary to the Rajang River. The river has previously had issues with pollution, but in recent years initiatives have been undertaken to improve the situation.

== See also ==
- List of rivers of Malaysia
