= Bangkit River =

River in Sarawak, Malaysia

Coordinates: 1°40′24.2″N 112°44′49.3″E

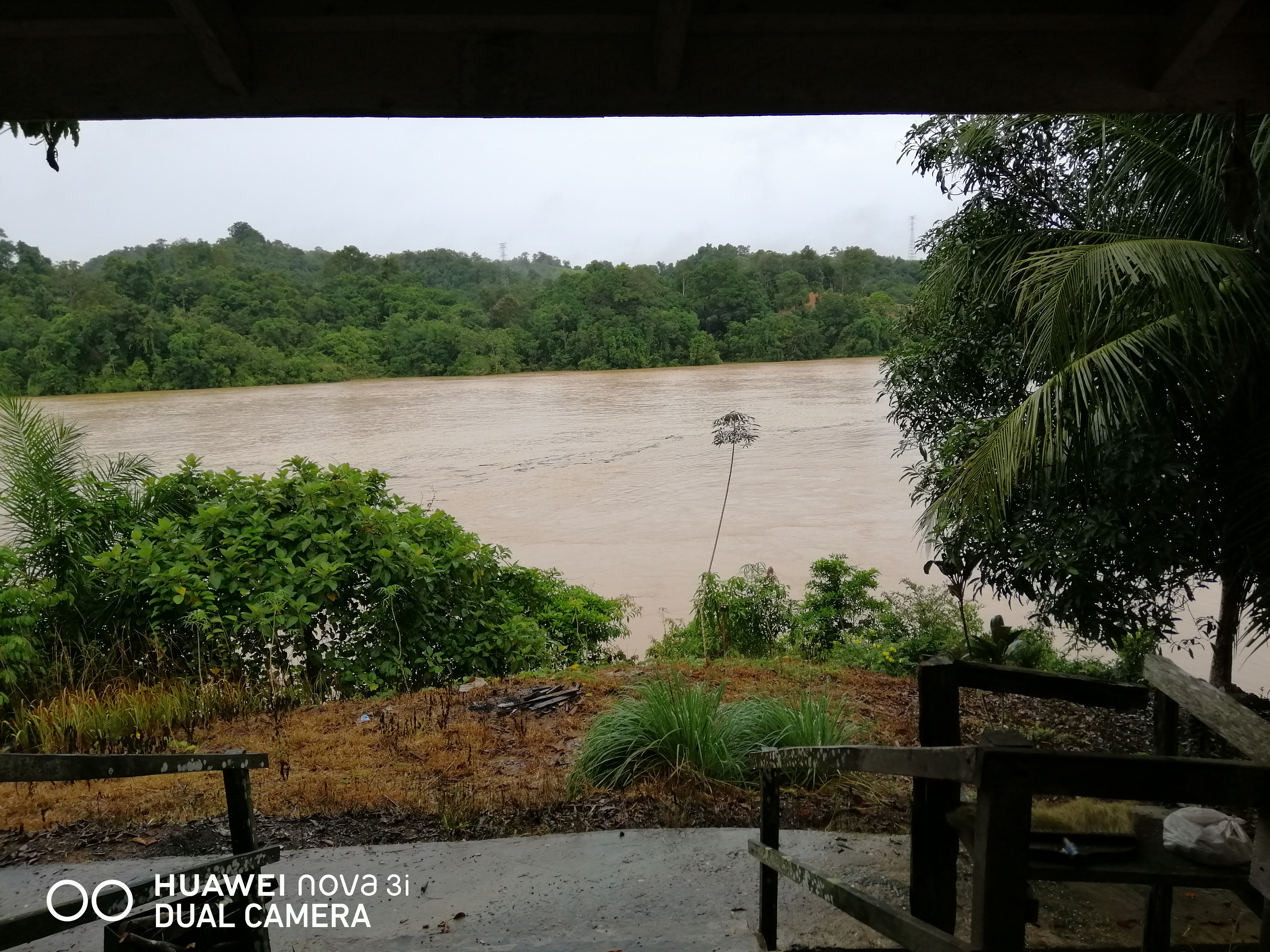
Bangkit River as seen from a long house.

Bangkit River (Malay: Sungai Bangkit) is a river in Sarawak state, Malaysia. It is a tributary of the Rajang River.

== See also ==
- List of rivers of Malaysia
