= Padas River =

River in Sabah, Malaysia

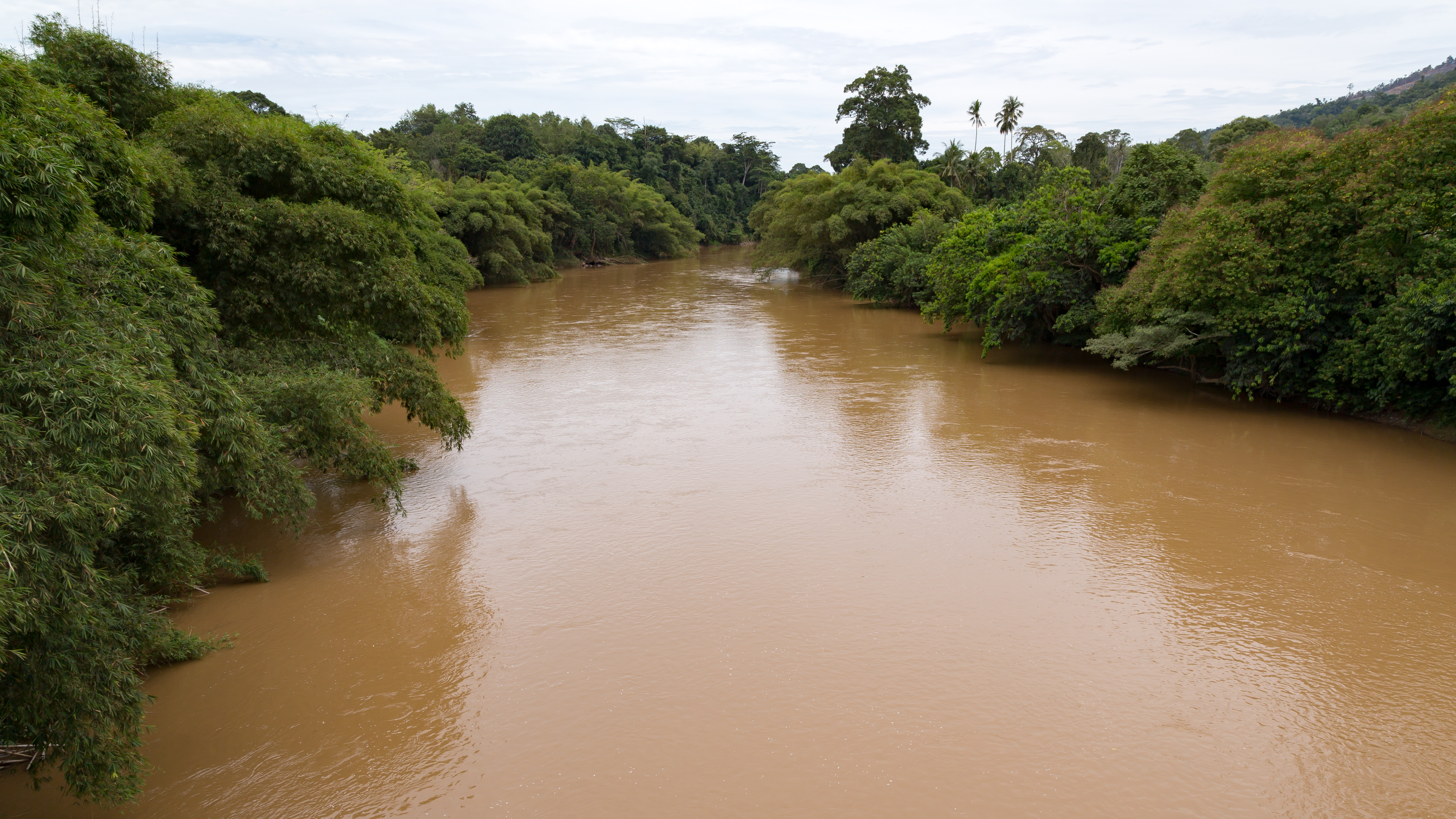
- View of the river.
- Native name: Sungai Padas (Malay) in Long Pasia.

Location
- Country: Malaysia
- State: Sabah
- Division: Interior Division
- Precise location: Northwestern Borneo

Physical characteristics
- Source
  - location: From Long Pasia through mountains in Beaufort, Keningau and Tenom Districts
- Mouth
  - location: At Beaufort District into South China Sea
  - coordinates: 5°10′50.4″N 115°33′36.7″E
  - elevation: Sea level
- Length: 120 km (75 mi)
- Basin size: 9,180 km^{2} (3,540 sq mi)
- Discharge
  - location: Near mouth
  - average: 9.43 km^{3}/a (299 m^{3}/s)

Basin features
- Progression: South China Sea
- River system: Padas River

The Padas River (Malay: Sungai Padas) is a river in Interior Division, southwestern Sabah of Malaysia. It has a total length of 120 km (75 miles) from its headwaters in the mountains of northwest Sabah to its outlet at the South China Sea, southwest of Beaufort town. It originates from the Long Pasia in Sipitang and goes through the mountains in the interior Beaufort, Keningau and Tenom Districts, which are part of the Crocker Range system. Padas river is from Long Pasia.

== Features ==
The river is important to provide water supply to Labuan and both districts of Beaufort and Tenom including as the main source of hydroelectric power to entire west coast of Sabah. The river is among the destination for water rafting activities in Sabah aside from Liwagu and Kiulu River.

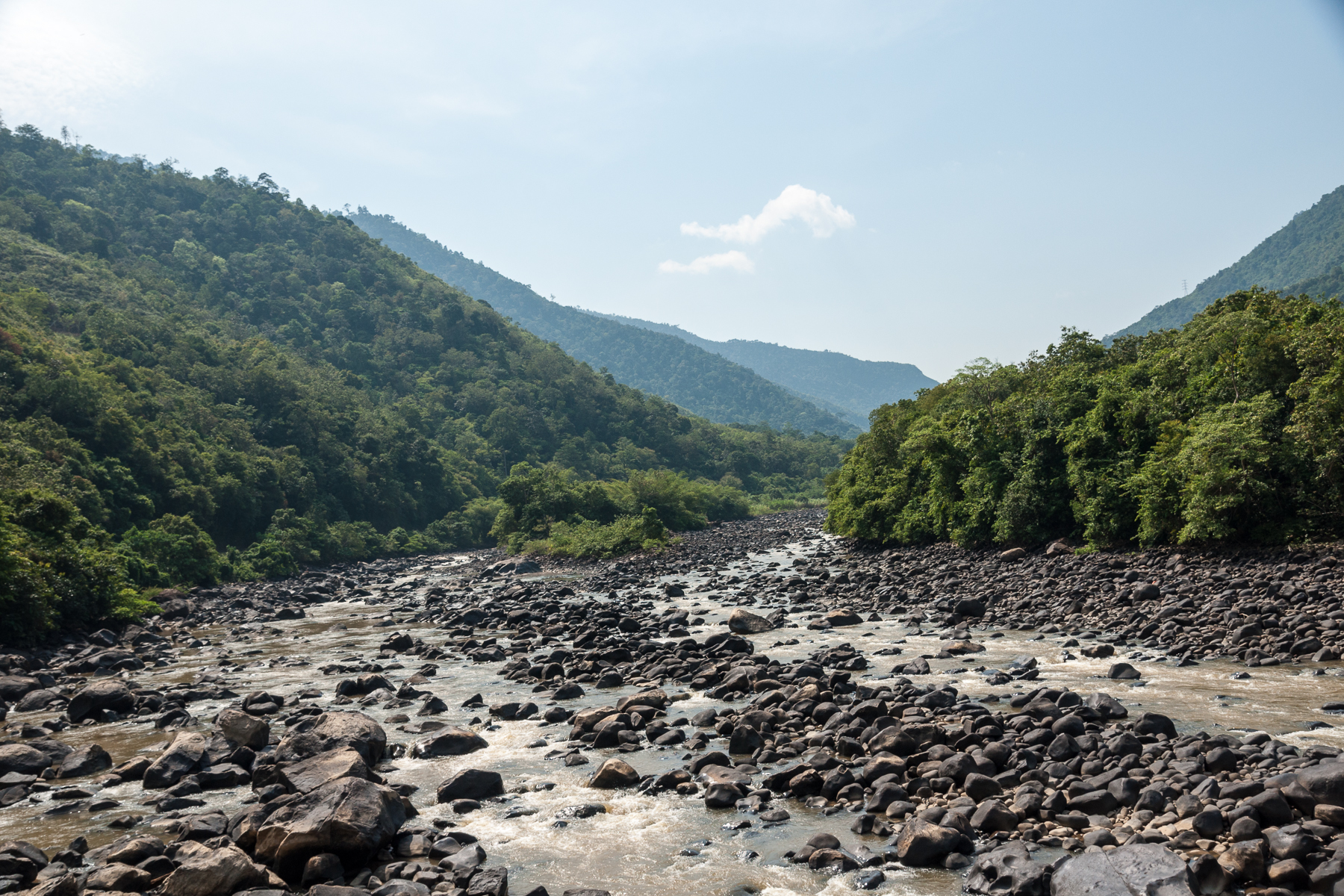
Rocks in the river.

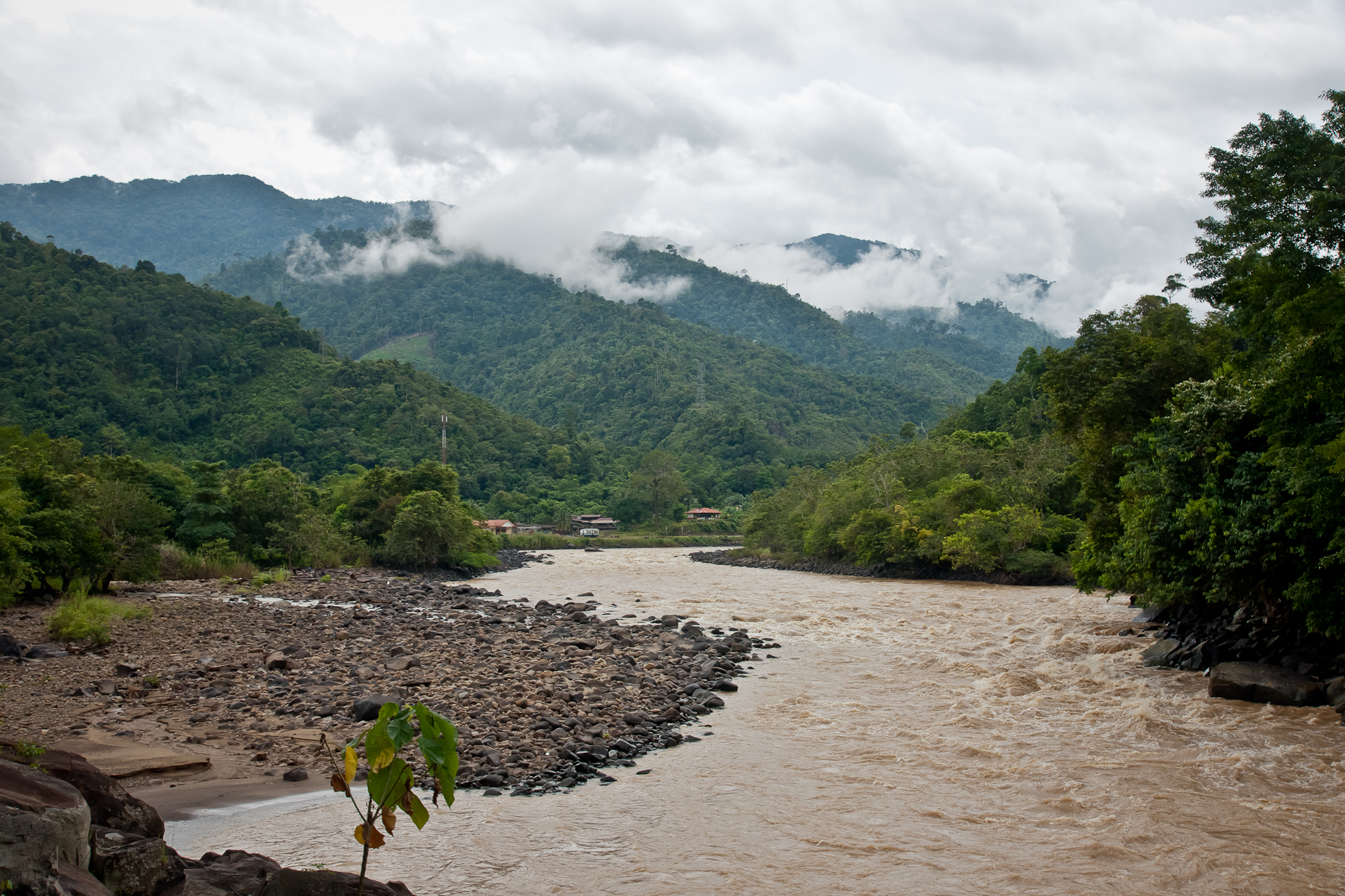
The river view from Padas Valley.

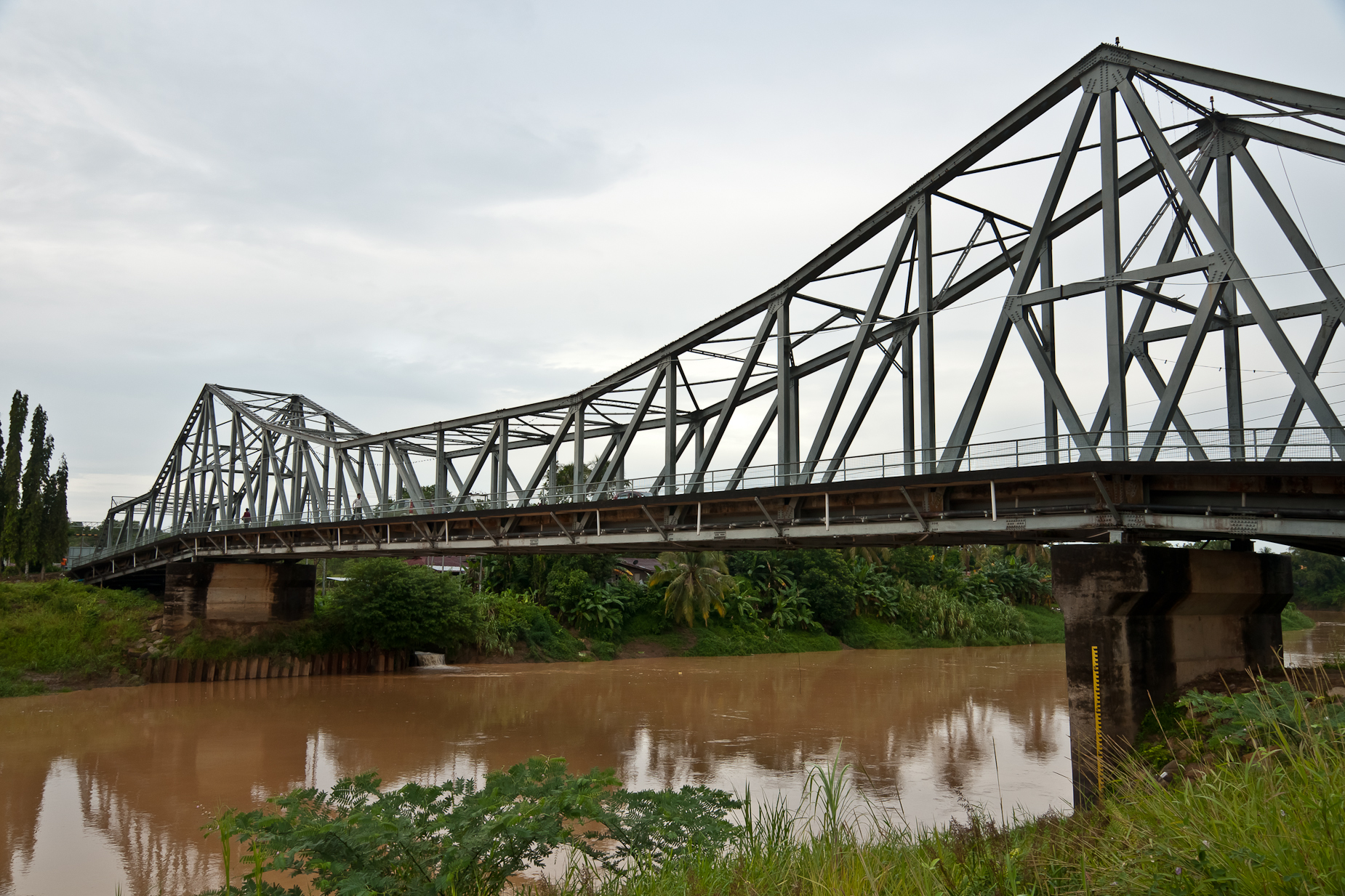
Vehicle bridge passing the river in Beaufort.

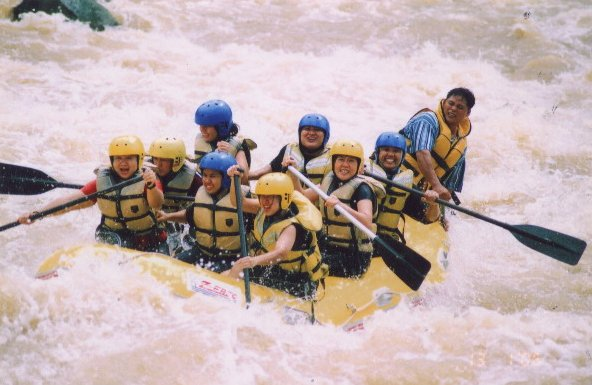
Water rafting activities in the river whitewater.

== See also ==
- List of rivers of Malaysia
- Sitompok Bridge
