= Kesang River =

River in Johor and Melaka, Malaysia

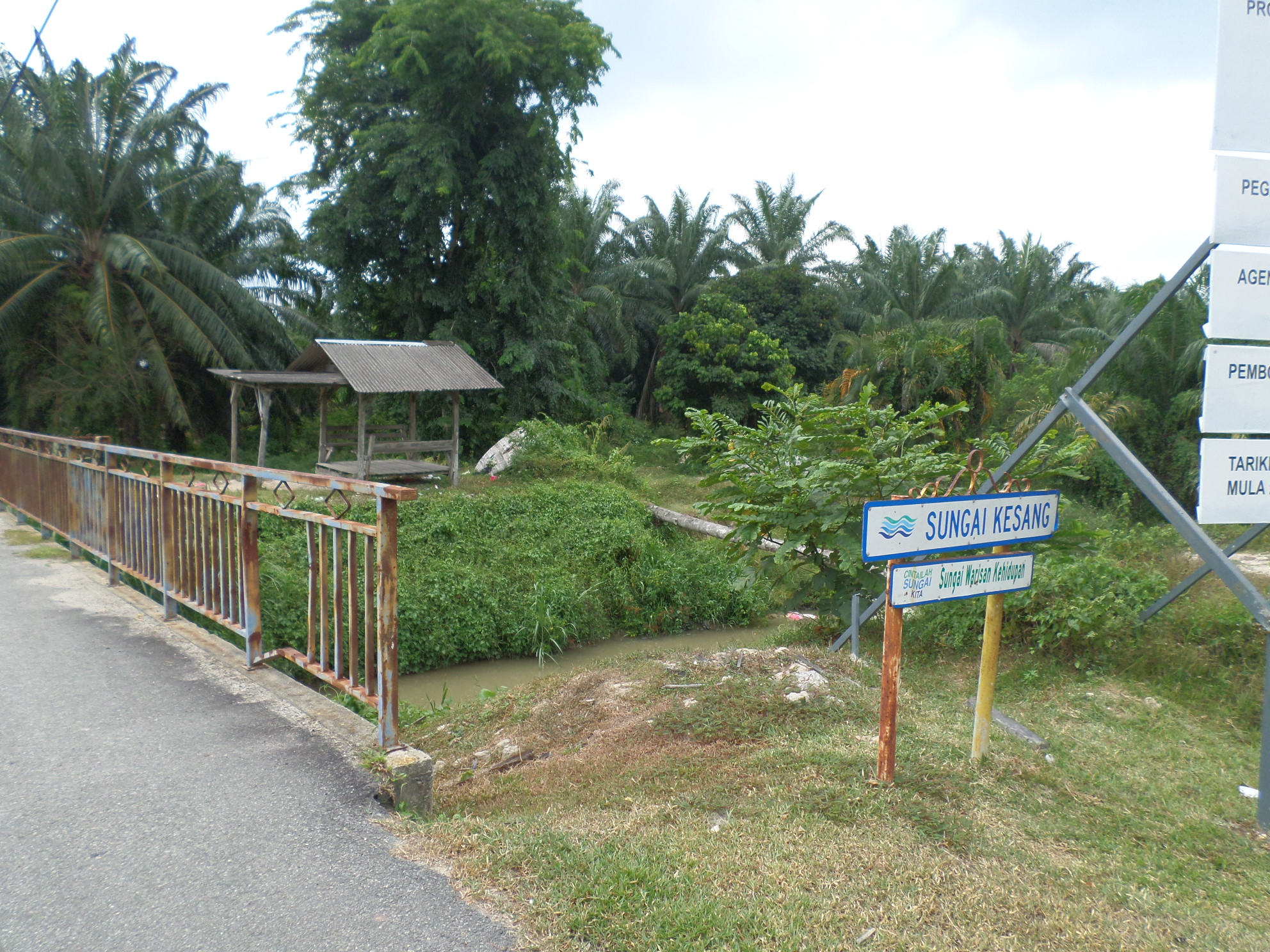
The upstream of the Kesang River in Jasin, Malacca

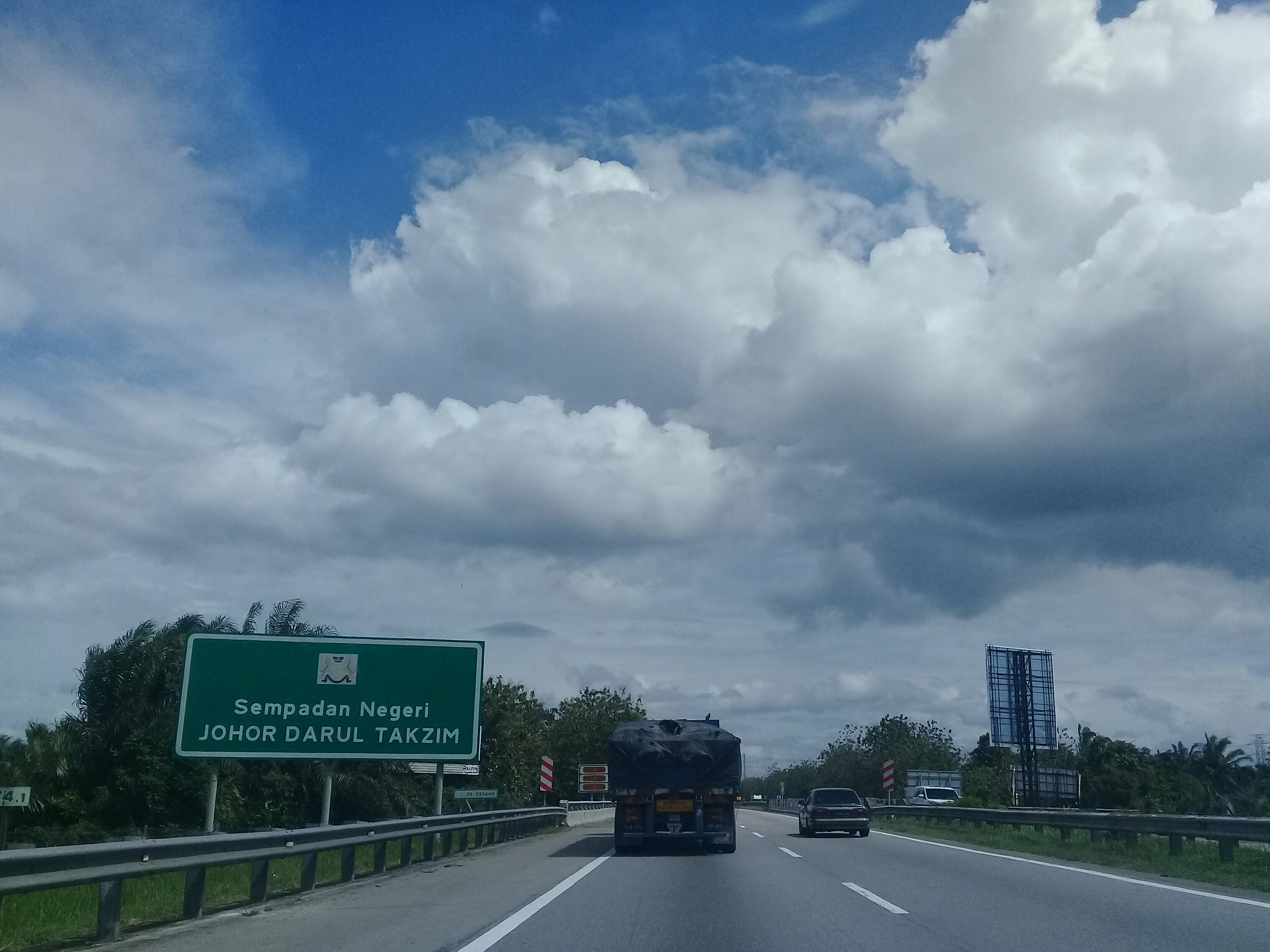
Kesang River Bridge at PLUS Highway

The Kesang River (Malay: Sungai Kesang) is the border river between Johor and Malacca states of Malaysia, together with the Chohong River. It supplies more than 54 million litres of water daily to the residents.

== See also ==
- Geography of Malaysia
