= Tuaran River =

River in Sabah, Malaysia

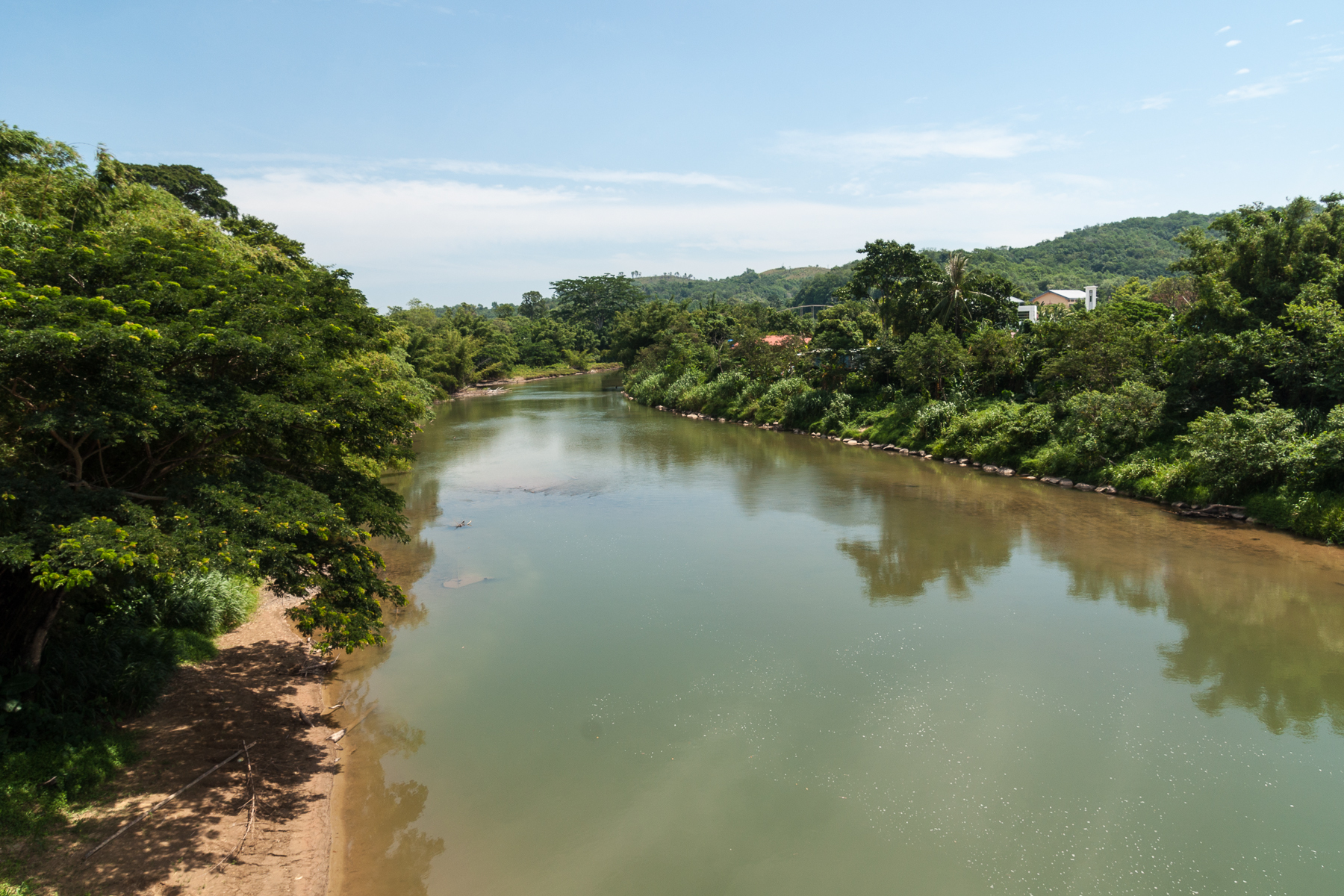
- View of the river.
- Native name: Sungai Tuaran (Malay)

Location
- Country: Malaysia
- State: Sabah
- Division: West Coast Division
- Precise location: Northwestern Borneo

Physical characteristics
- Source
  - location: From mountains in Tuaran District
- Mouth
  - location: At Tuaran District into South China Sea
  - coordinates: 6°13′19.3″N 116°11′10.0″E
  - elevation: Sea level
- Length: 80 km (50 mi)
- Basin size: 988 km^{2} (381 sq mi)
- Discharge
  - location: Near mouth
  - average: 65.4 m^{3}/s (2.06 km^{3}/a)

Basin features
- Progression: South China Sea
- River system: Tuaran River

The Tuaran River (Malay: Sungai Tuaran, Kadazan Dusun: Bawang Tuaran) is a river in West Coast Division, northwestern Sabah of Malaysia. It has a total length of 80 km (50 miles) from its headwaters in the mountains of northwest Sabah to its outlet at the South China Sea, northwest of Tuaran town.

== History ==
The small town of Tuaran owes its existence to the river after which it is named. The river is also part of the route where British colonial administrator Hugh Low began his journey for the first recorded ascent of North Borneo's highest point of Mount Kinabalu, having departed from Labuan in 1851.

== Conservation efforts ==
Much of the river is covered by mangrove palm and swamps that providing natural coastal protection and habitat for several bird species. It is home to saltwater crocodiles (Crocodylus porosus) and notable for many crocodile incidents. Since the 2000s, the coasts of the river was affected by sand mining activities with 14 identified locations. Beginning in the 2010s, the Sabah government through the Lands and Surveys Department (LSD) began to increase operation against illegal sand mining in Tuaran as well on Papar River.

== Features ==
The river is the freshwater fish source for the villagers and the source of water for their agriculture activities.

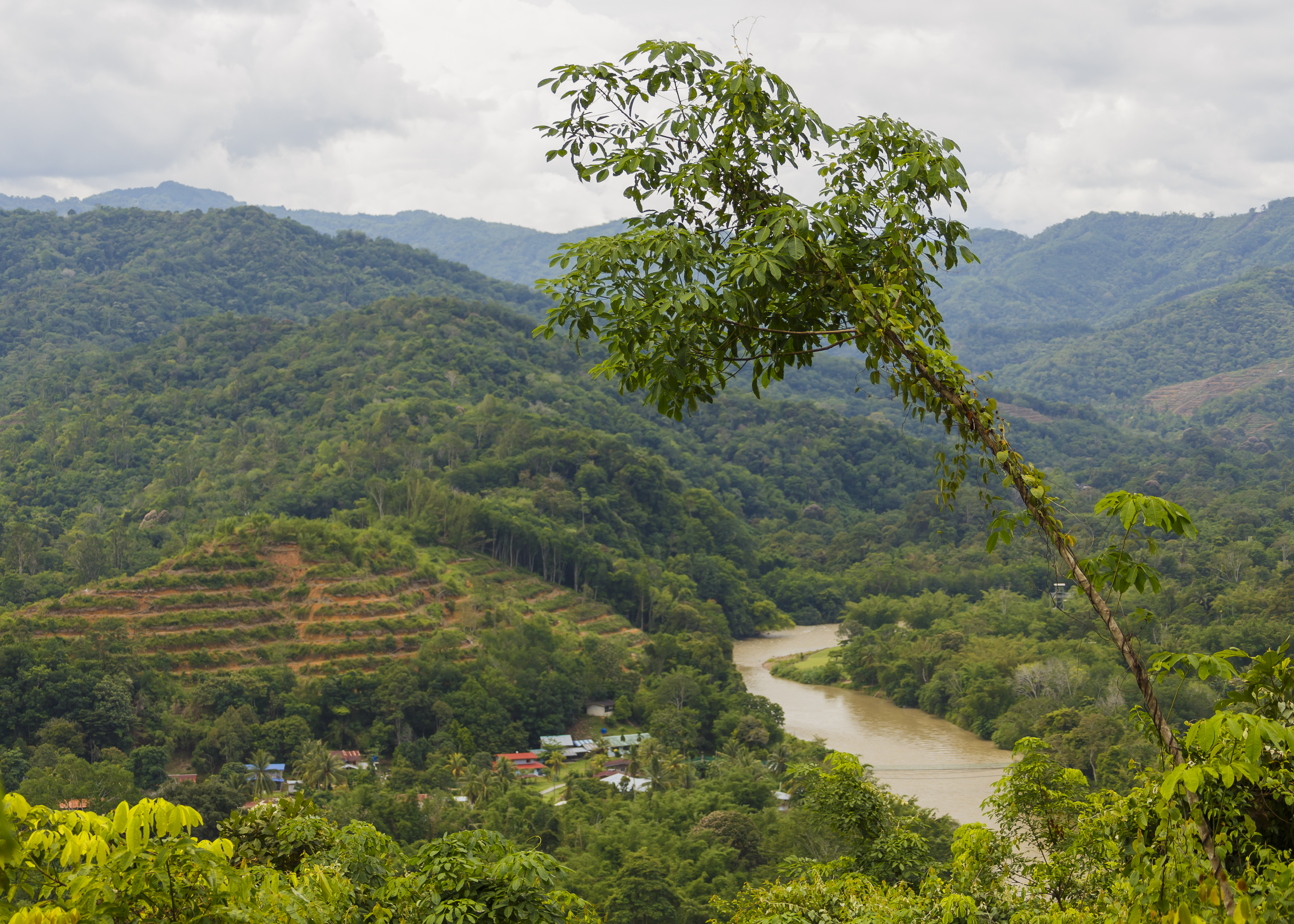
The river seen from afar.

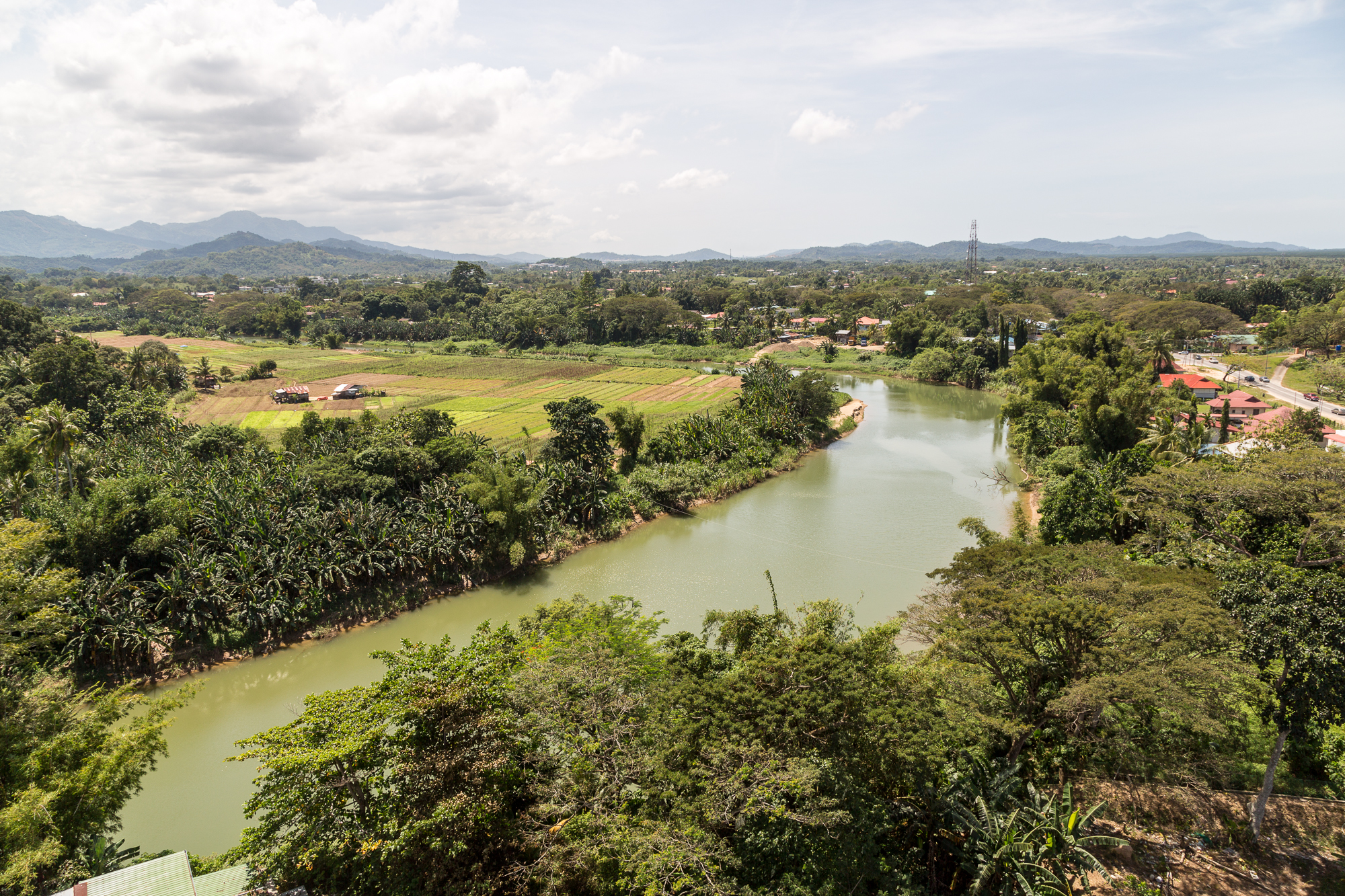
The river view from Ling San Pagoda.

== See also ==
- List of rivers of Malaysia
