= Klias Forest Reserve =

Protected area in Sabah, Malaysia

- IUCN category Ia (strict nature reserve)
- Location within Borneo
- Location: Sabah, Malaysia
- Nearest city: Beaufort, Beaufort District
- Coordinates: 5°17′37″N 115°37′50″E
- Area: 36.3 km^{2} (14.0 sq mi)
- Established: 1984
- Governing body: Sabah Forestry Department

Klias Forest Reserve is a protected forest reserve on the Klias Peninsula, in Beaufort District of Interior Division, Sabah, Malaysia. It was designated as a Class 1 Protection Forest by the Sabah Forestry Department in 1984. Its area is 3,630 hectares (36.3 km^{2}). The reserve is mostly flat, consisting mainly of peat swamp forest, with a small area of mangroves. The peat forests within this reserve, along with those in the nearby Binsuluk Forest Reserve, are the last peat forests in Sabah.

Being mostly peat forest, the reserve faces high fire risks. Large fires occurred in 1997–98, burning about 10% of the Klias Reserve. In 2016 large fires in peat bogs, which spread to Klias and other forest reserves from nearby open burning, contributed to the 2016 Malaysian haze.

== Flora ==
Klias and Binsuluk Forest Reserves are within the Klias Peninsula Important Bird Area (IBA). The IBA has a combined species richness of at least 134 identified tree species. Four species of Nepenthes pitcher plants have been recorded in the IBA. Resident tree species include Dryobalanops rappa, Madhuca motleyana, Shorea platycarpa, Dactylocladus stenostachys and Gonystylus bancanus.

== Fauna ==
Klias Forest Reserve is home to threatened mammals including banded palm civet, pig-tailed macaque, proboscis monkey, sambar deer, Bornean bearded pig, mousedeer and the critically endangered Sunda pangolin. Bird life in the reserve includes the hook-billed bulbul, whose Sabah range is confined to the Klias Peninsula, and the rare species grey-breasted babbler and scarlet-breasted flowerpecker. Five amphibians inhabit the IBA: Hoplobathracus rogulosa, Rana erythraea, Rana glandulosa, Polypedates coletti and Polypedates leucomystax. 66 butterfly species have been discovered within the peat forests.
