= Tiga Island, Malaysia =

Island of Sabah, Malaysia

Tiga Island
Native name: Pulau Tiga
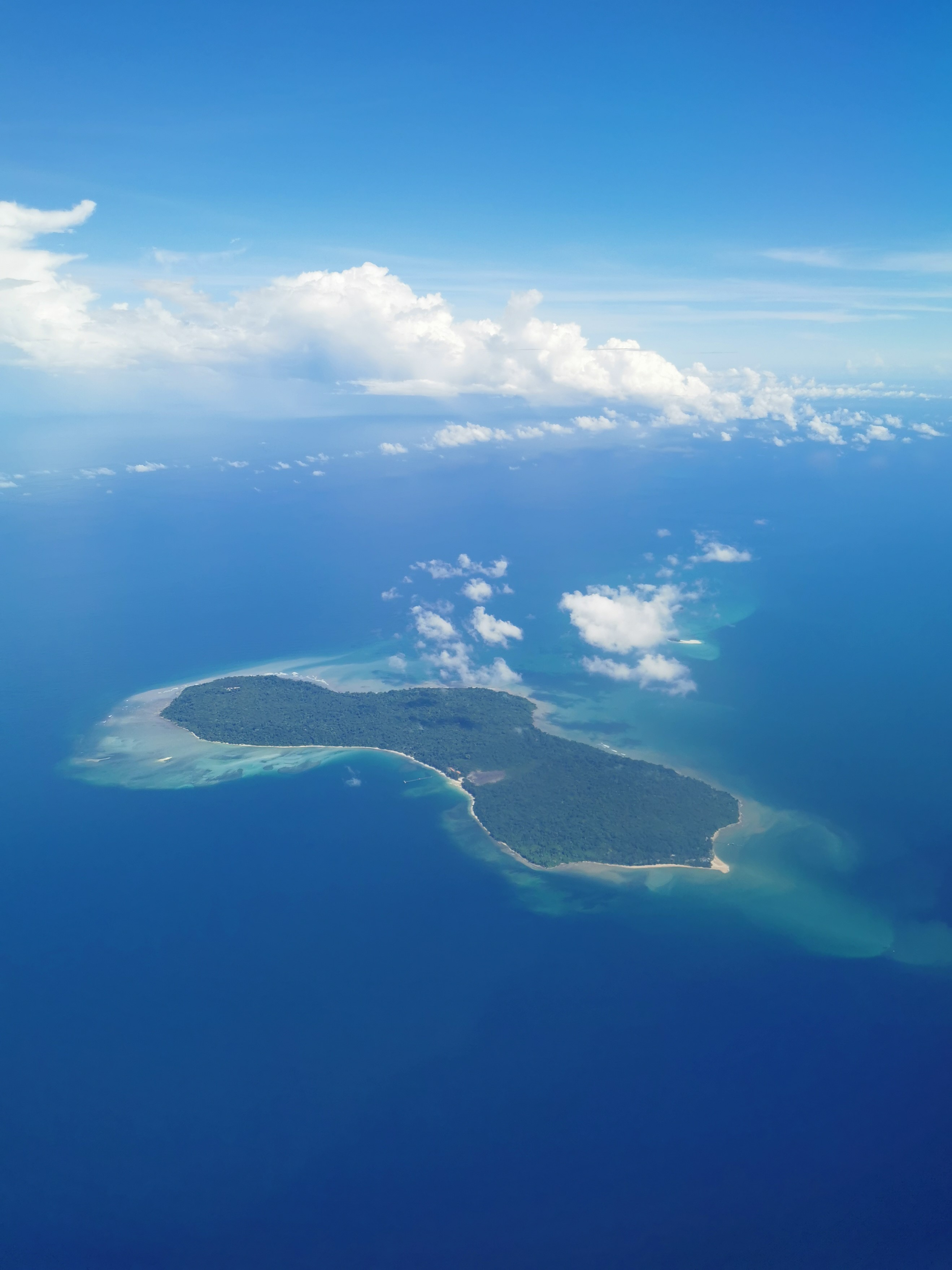
- Tiga Island as seen from an aeroplane approaching the Kota Kinabalu International Airport
- Interactive map of Tiga Island

Geography
- Location: Tiga Island Park
- Coordinates: 5°43′19″N 115°38′59″E
- Archipelago: Borneo (Greater Sunda Islands)
- Adjacent to: South China Sea
- Highest elevation: 100 m (300 ft)

Administration
- Malaysia
- State: Sabah
- Division: Interior
- District: Kuala Penyu

Tiga Island (Malay: Pulau Tiga) is one of a group of small uninhabited volcanic islands in Kimanis Bay at the Interior Division, off the western coast of Kuala Penyu District, Sabah, Malaysia. The island is 607 hectares (1,500 acres) in size and has a couple of active mud volcanos at the highest part of the island. Tiga Island is one of the three islands that make up Tiga Island Park (TIP), the other being the Kalampunian Besar and Kalampunian Damit islands. The park headquarters are on the island, comprising an office complex, and accommodation for the park staff and visiting scientists. The waters around the island became the destination for scuba diving, deep diving, kayaking, and snorkelling activities.

== Etymology ==
The island name of "Tiga" (literally "three" in English) is derived from three undulating humps which is visible from a distance when visitors are approaching the island.

== History ==
In 1594, the Dutch through Voorcompagnieën (a predecessor of the Dutch East India Company (VOC)) published a cartographer map of the East Indies based on the voyage of Petrus Plancius with several islands in the South China Sea such as Pulo Tigao/Putigao/Tigaon (Labuan), Pulo Tiga (Tiga Island), and Mon Pracem/Mompracem/Mōpracam (Kuraman Island) on the western coast of northern Borneo, all three islands was once under the thalassocracy of the Sultanate of Brunei. (Note: The Dutch East India Company (VOC) through its predecessor of Voorcompagnieën was once publishing a cartography map of the East Indies through the voyage of Petrus Plancius in 1594 featuring the islands of the South China Sea, such as the former Bruneian Labuan Island labelled as "Pulo Tigao", Tiga Island as "Pulo Tiga", and Kuraman Island as "Mon Pracem", including the Vietnamese Côn Sơn Island as "Pulo Condor", among others, although the Dutch did not establish any permanent settlement on either of the islands.)

With the earlier presence of the English East India Company (EIC) in Balambangan and Banggi islands within the waters of the Borneo coast in the 1700s and increase English dispute with Sulu chiefs, Sultan Muhammad Tajuddin sent an ambassador to urge the English to move their settlement nearer to Brunei, either on Labuan, Tiga, or Gaya Island. In 1765, British navigator Thomas Forrest, serving under the EIC, made a survey on the island. Following the establishment of a solid presence of the British through the North Borneo Chartered Company (NBCC) and the subsequent British North Borneo state in 1881, Sultan Abdul Momin of Brunei, ceded both Sipitang and Kuala Penyu in 1884 where the cession stipulates to includes any islands located in the coast of the sea within the said territory.

The island of Tiga, located north of the Klias Peninsula, was mentioned in several sources as having been formed through the volcanic eruption near Borneo caused by a strong earthquake that occurred on Mindanao on 21 September 1897, although this was debatable. (Note: The formation of the island from earthquake in neighbouring country have become sources of debate since various maps of Borneo published before 1897 indicate the island is charted on maps dating back to 1554 and specifically named on more than 40 maps. The cause of erroneous data is believed to have originated from a 1986 study by McManus and Tate, who appear to have confused reports of an island forming off the Klias Peninsula in 1897 with an eruption of Tiga Island.)

== Geography ==
The island is situated at the northern of Interior Division opposite the swamp of Klias Peninsula, on the left side of the neighbouring West Coast Division. It is one of the three islands comprising the Tiga Island National Park, with the other being the Kalampunian Damit (known for its coral reef and snake habitat), and slightly larger island of Kalampunian Besar which comes in the form of a large sandbar. The highest point is located in the centre of the island with only 100 metres (330 ft) above sea level.

=== Climate ===
The island location within the tropical rain belt makes it susceptible to a rainy season throughout the year, with October to January among the wettest as part of the northeast monsoon, while the winds blow consistently throughout the southwest monsoon from April to October, leading to a period of dryness, while the least wet months are from February to April during the inter-monsoon period. Total rainfall recorded was some 2,540 millimetres (100 inches) per annum, with the average daily mean temperature varying between 22 °C (72 °F) and 33 °C (91 °F). Although the island receives quite high precipitation, its sources of freshwater are limited with the absence of water catchments due to the very low elevation of the island summit since most of the rainwater runs off into the sea. The island groundwater is a vital freshwater source but was affected by sanitation facilities located too close to the groundwater wells, with a bacteriological analysis conducted in 2009 showing the poor groundwater quality.

=== Conservation sites ===
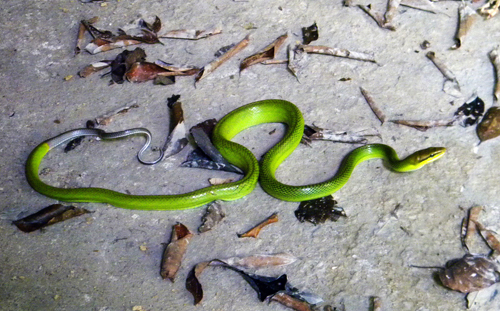
A Gonyosoma oxycephalum (Grey-tailed racer) green snake found on the island, 2009

It was first classified as a forest reserve in 1933 by the authority of British North Borneo and then became a marine park in 1978 with the current management and jurisdiction falls within the purview of Sabah Parks. The island features a variety of flora and fauna with a rich marine ecosystem, coupled with a variety of bird species, including Columba griseigularis, pied hornbills, and megapodes. It also becomes the habitat for mammals such as long-tailed macaques and reptiles such as monitor lizards and skinks, which can be spotted roaming around the island. Its neighbouring island, the Kalampunian Damit Island (literally the Snake Island), which is part of the Tiga Island National Park with a landmass consisting of limestone, sandstone, and shale with trees such as figs and Pisonia, becomes the natural breeding ground for various snakes (including sea snakes), hosting thousands of species such as the Yellow-lipped sea krait (Laticauda colubrina), Paradise tree snake (Chrysopelea paradisi), and the Grey-tailed racer (Gonyosoma oxycephalum) that emerge around the island with some slithering around Tiga Island especially during mating season.

== Transportation ==
Located 48 kilometres (30 mi) south of Kota Kinabalu and the Tunku Abdul Rahman Park (TARP), TIP is reached by driving the 140 kilometres (87 mi) to Kuala Penyu town, a settlement on the tip of the Klias Peninsula. From the town it is another 18 kilometres (11 miles), or about 30 minutes, by boat. Another way of getting to the island is by chartering a speed boat from the city of Kota Kinabalu, or taking a flight to the federal territory of Labuan and charter a speed boat from there.

== In the media ==
Tiga Island became well known through the Survivor television series. It was the setting of Survivor: Borneo, the first American season of the show. It was also the setting of the first seasons of the British shows. The island was also rumoured to be the setting of the third season of Australian Survivor. However, it was later revealed that Samoa would be used as the location for the series.

== Gallery ==
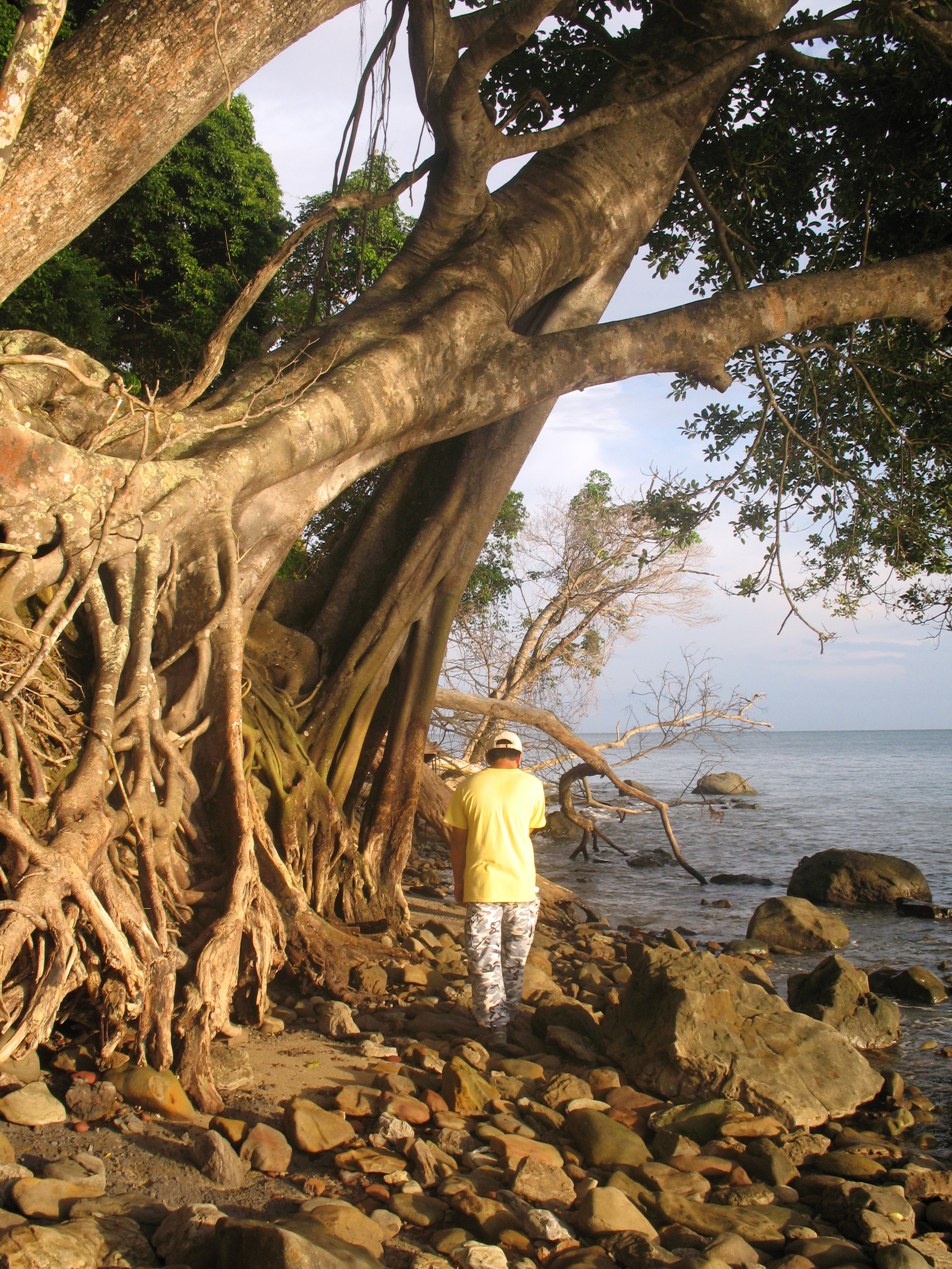
Tree growing on Tiga Island shore

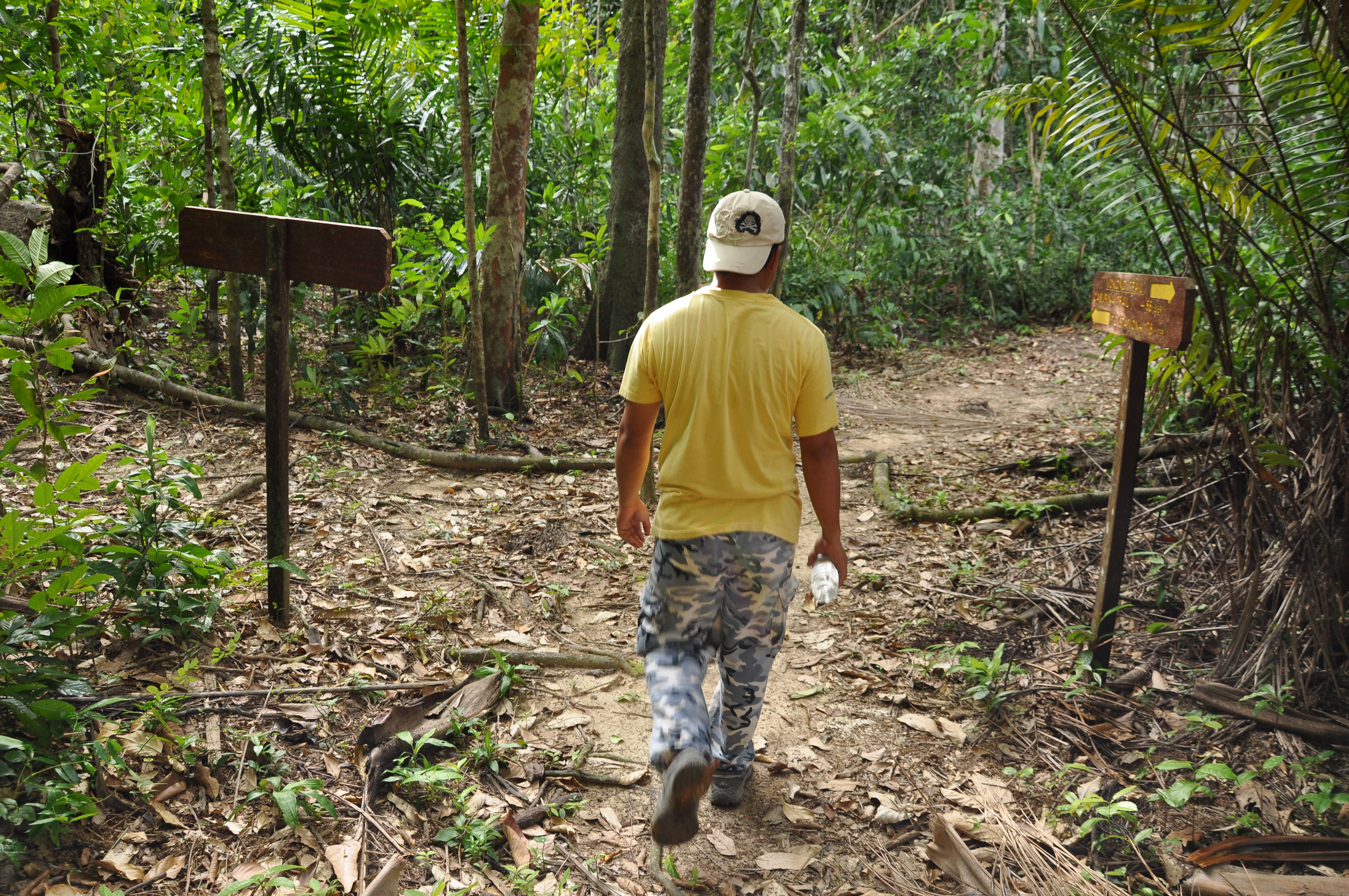
Tiga Island trail crossroads

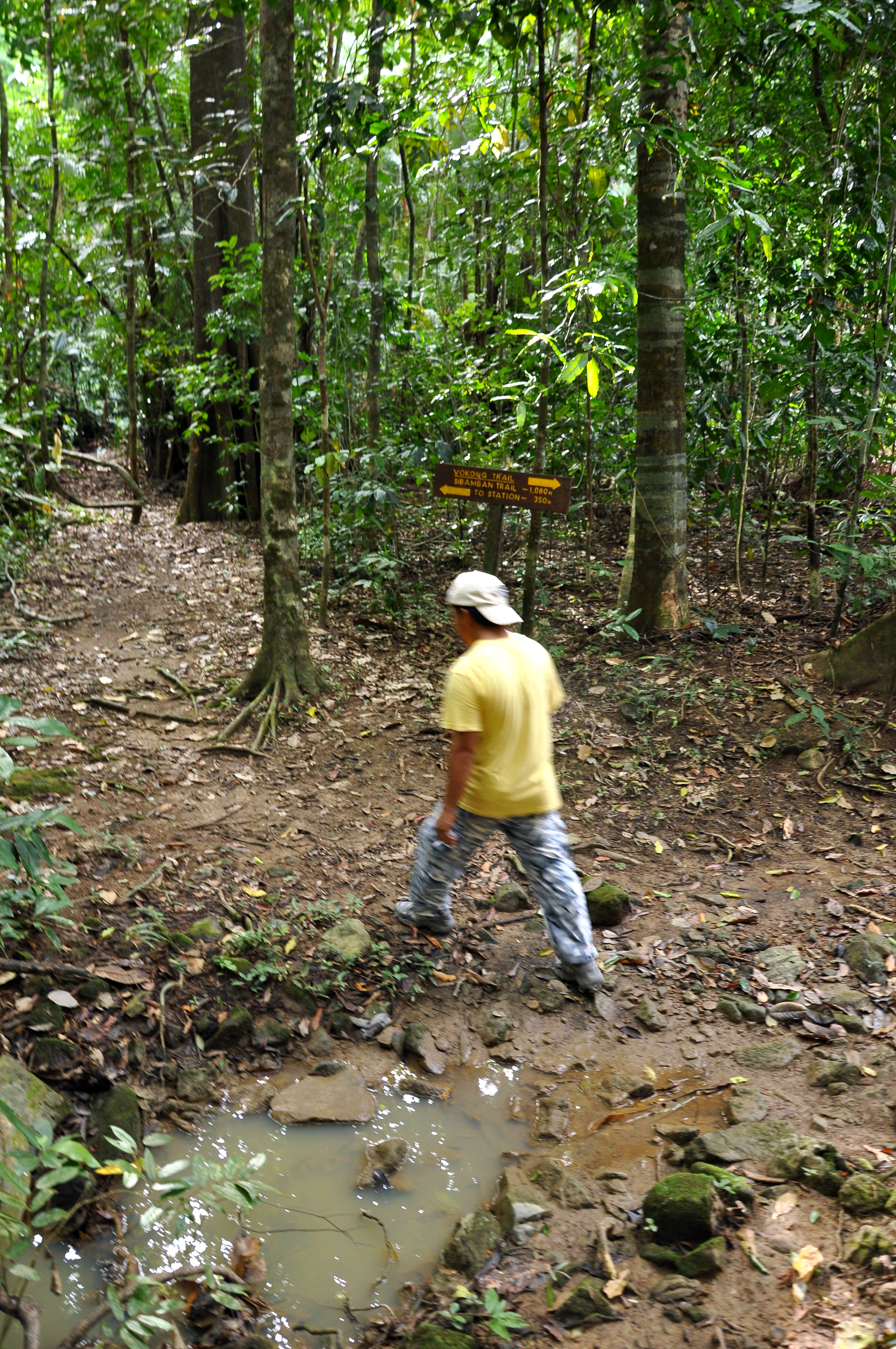
Walking along one of the Tiga Island trails

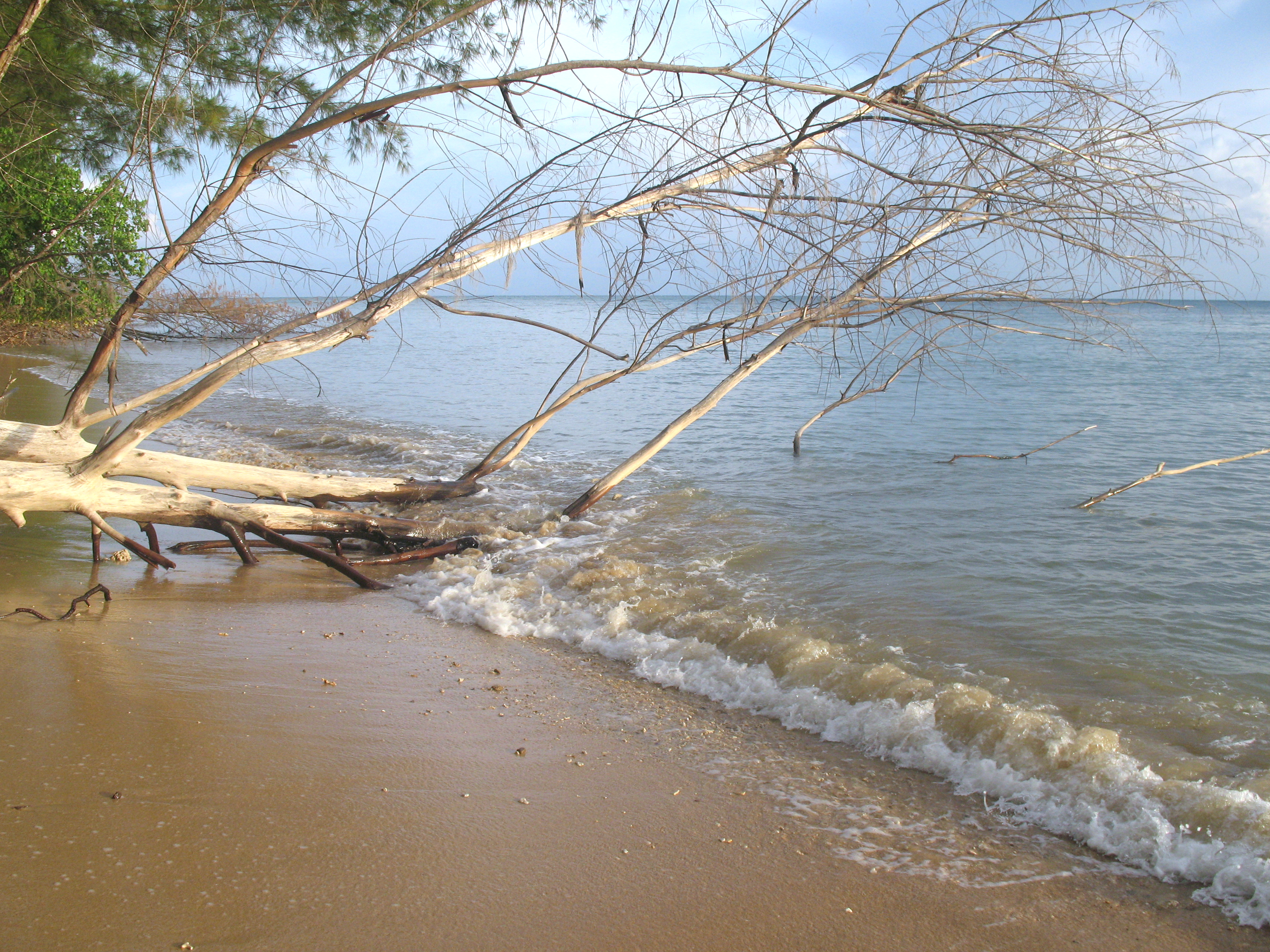
Fallen tree on a Tiga beach

== See also ==
- List of islands of Malaysia
