= Binsuluk Forest Reserve =

Protected forest reserve in Malaysia

- IUCN category Ia (strict nature reserve)
- Location within Borneo
- Location: Sabah, Malaysia
- Nearest city: Beaufort, Beaufort District
- Coordinates: 5°28′43″N 115°40′52″E
- Area: 121.06 km^{2} (46.74 sq mi)
- Established: 1984
- Governing body: Sabah Forestry Department

Binsuluk Forest Reserve, also Binsulok Forest Reserve, is a protected forest reserve on the Klias Peninsula, in Beaufort District of Interior Division, Sabah, Malaysia. It was designated as a Class 1 Protection Forest by the Sabah Forestry Department in 1992. Its area is 12,106 hectares (121.06 km^{2}). The reserve is mostly flat, consisting mostly of peat swamp forest, with a small area of mangroves. The peat forests within this reserve, along with those in the nearby Klias Forest Reserve, are the last peat forests in Sabah.

Being mostly peat forest, the reserve faces high fire risks. Large fires occurred in 1997–98, burning most of the park. In 2016 large fires in peat bogs, which were caused by fires spread to Binsuluk and other forest reserves from nearby open burning, contributed to the 2016 Malaysian haze. Over half of the reserve were burnt during this event. Open burning caused yet another forest fire in 2020, this time burning 274 hectares (2.74 km^{2}).

== Flora ==
Binsuluk and Klias Forest Reserves have a combined species richness of at least identified 134 tree species. Four species of Nepenthes pitcher plants have been recorded. Some tree species are Dryobalanops rappa, Shorea platycarpa, Dactylocladus stenostachys and Gonystylus bancanus. However the status of these species is uncertain given the fires and logging activities. An IUCN assessment in 2019 did not include Binsuluk as part of the species habitat for Dryobalanops rappa.

== Fauna ==
Binsuluk Forest Reserve is home to mammals including wild boar, sambar deer and macaque monkeys. There are five amphibians found between the two forest reserves, Hoplobathracus rogulosa, Rana erythraea, Rana glandulosa, Polypedates coletti, and Polypedates leucomystax. Saltwater crocodiles are present on the peninsula. 66 butterfly species have been discovered within the peat forests.
