= Sino-Native =

Chinese-indigenous descended ethnic group of Sabah, Malaysia

Sino-Native 半唐番 Peranakan Cina (Sabah)
Regions with significant populations
- Malaysia; Sabah (Statewide, notably in the western coastal regions and areas with substantial Chinese, Kadazan-Dusun, Murut and Rungus populations); Labuan

Languages
- Dusunic languages (Mainly Kadazan and Dusun); Murut; Rungus; Chinese languages (Mainly Hakka, Cantonese, Hokkien and Mandarin); Malaysian (Sabah Malay); Malaysian English (Sabahan English)

Religion
- Christianity (Mainly Roman Catholic and Protestant); Mahāyāna Buddhism; Taoism (Chinese folk religion); Sunni Islam; Momolianism; Irreligion

Related ethnic groups
- Kadazan-Dusun; Murut; Rungus; Malaysian Chinese; Peranakan

The Sino-Native, often referred to simply as Sino, represent a population with a diverse background resulting from marriages between the Chinese community and the indigenous peoples of Sabah. They are distinguished by their mixed genealogical heritage, resulting in a fusion of oriental and local cultures. This blending of traditions has given rise to distinct sub-groups within the Sino community, most notably Sino-Kadazan, Sino-Dusun, Sino-Murut and Sino-Rungus.

Analogus to other Peranakans of Maritime Southeast Asia, the Sino-Natives embody a unique cultural blend resulting from intermarriages between Chinese and the indigenous peoples of Sabah. This cultural synthesis is evident in various aspects of their lives, including language, cuisine, customs and religious practices.

== Cultural nomenclature ==
The term "Sino" is often rendered in Malaysian Mandarin as "Bàn táng fān" (半唐番, which translates to "half Chinese and half Native"). Similarly, terms like Peranakan, Peranakan Cina and Peranakan Tionghua, mostly used by older Sino generations, also highlight this unique identity.

While "Sino" commonly refers to denote individuals with mixed Chinese and Kadazan-Dusun, Murut or Rungus heritage, it is occasionally extended for other biracial Sabahan people that have Chinese ancestry, such as Sino-Bajau, Sino-Brunei and Sino-Bisaya. However, such extensions are rare and occur infrequently within Sabah's ethnic landscape.

== History ==
=== Historical intermarriage ===
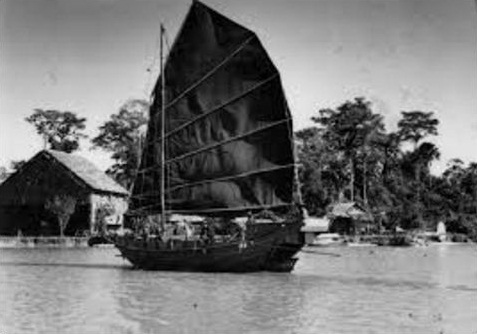
A Chinese junk in Kinabatangan, North Borneo

The historical practice of intermarriage between Kadazans and Chinese can be traced back to the mid-18th century, specifically between the 1760s and 1790s. During this period, the Brunei Sultanate played a pivotal role in facilitating the migration of thousands of Chinese farmers to Sabah, with the aim of bolstering pepper cultivation for the global market. These Chinese farmers, backed by Bruneian landlords, embarked on establishing pepper plantations along the west coast of Sabah, marking a significant economic and cultural exchange between the Chinese and local communities.

British explorer Dalrymple provided early documentation of this phenomenon, noting in his records that around 50 Chinese individuals from Brunei and the local Dusun community cohabited at the mouth of the Tuaran River on Sabah's western shores. This coexistence and collaboration in agricultural endeavours laid the foundation for subsequent interactions and intermarriages between the Chinese immigrants and the indigenous Kadazan communities.

In 1776, explorer Thomas Forrest further documented the presence of Chinese-operated pepper plantations, this time at the mouth of the Putatan River. His accounts shed light on the expanding role of Chinese settlers in the agricultural activities of the area, highlighting their significant contribution to Sabah's economic development during that era.

=== Emergence of Sino-Natives ===
In a broader context, the intertwining of Chinese and indigenous communities in North Borneo (Sabah) has given rise to diverse Sino-Native groups.

The earliest documented mention of the Sino-Natives dates back to Spenser St. John's account in 1862. St. John, who served as the British Consul to Brunei at that time, chronicled the migration of Chinese traders from Labuan to Sitompok-Bundu and the Klias Peninsula. These migrants intermarried with native families, leading to the emergence of the Tatanas or Sino-Dusuns, a community that has retained significant Chinese cultural influences. St. John noted that many of the descendants claimed Chinese ancestry and were proficient in the Hokkien dialect, showcasing the cultural fusion resulting from these unions.

In his extensive study "Pagans of North Borneo," Owen Rutter provided a detailed analysis of how Chinese culture has profoundly influenced the Bundu Dusuns. He meticulously explored the unique Chinese cultural elements embedded within this particular group, emphasising their distinctive characteristics compared to other Dusun communities across North Borneo. Rutter's research underscored the substantial impact of historical intermarriages and ongoing cultural exchanges on the Bundu Dusuns, shedding light on the intricate dynamics of cultural assimilation and hybridisation within the region.

In a more contemporary context, Monica Glyn-Jones, a well-regarded anthropologist trained at Cambridge University, conducted an in-depth study on the Dusun community of Penampang from 1949 to 1951. In her study, she dedicated a chapter specifically to the Sino-Natives, delving into their relationship dynamics with the Chinese and exploring the concept of mutual acceptance within these mixed heritage communities.

Further insights into these mixed heritage communities were provided by Father A.G. Lampe, who highlighted the presence of Sino-Kadazans in areas like Klias and Kuala Penyu. His observations underscored the complex interplay of cultural heritage and identity formation resulting from historical intermarriages. The preservation of Chinese cultural customs among the Sino-Kadazans reflects the ongoing cultural complexities within these communities, offering valuable insights into the diverse cultural tapestry of North Borneo.

=== From intermarriages into a biracial identity ===
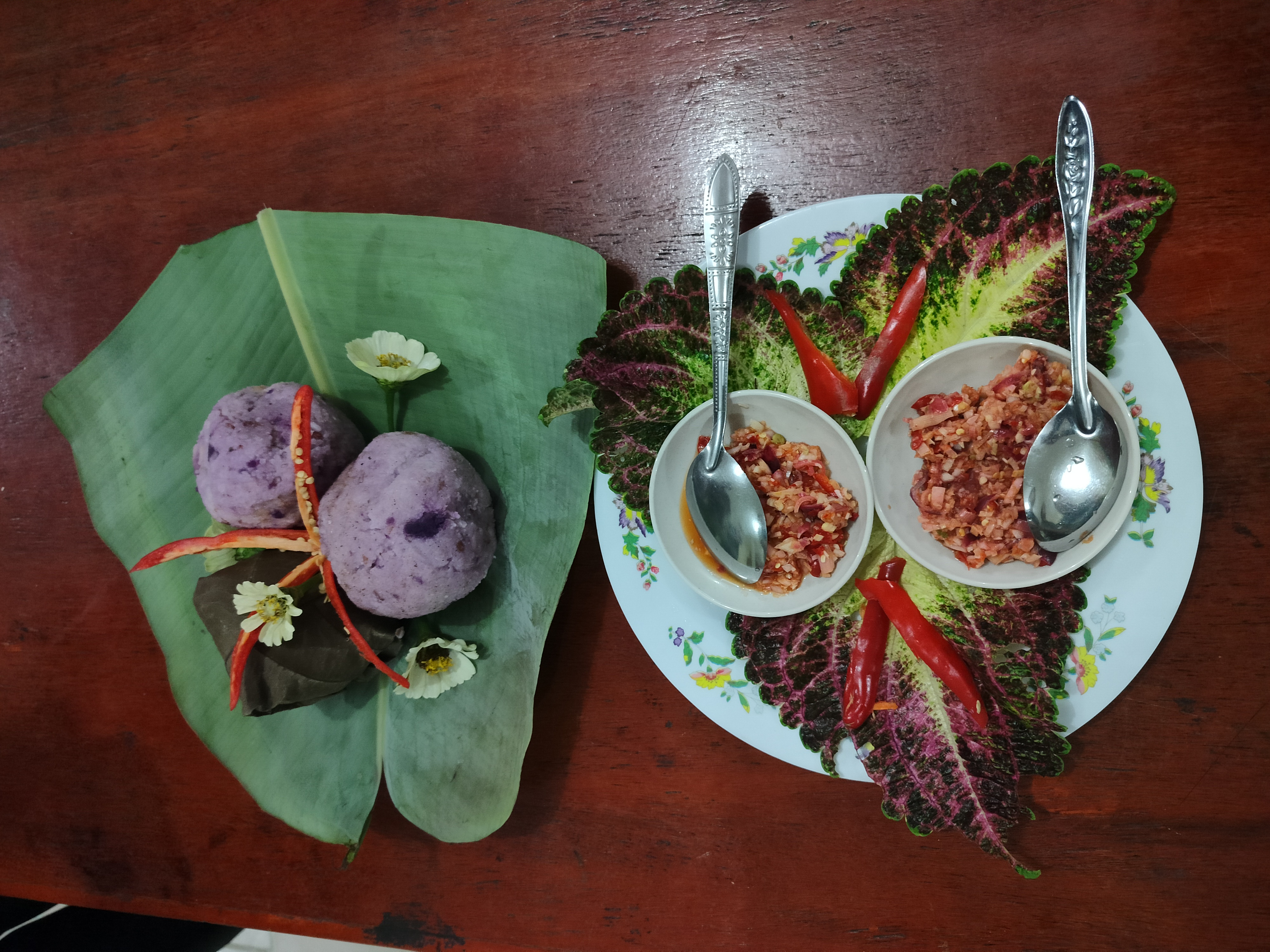
During Chinese New Year festivities, some Sino households may include indigenous delicacies such as Linopot and sambal Tuhau their traditional menu.

The intermarriage between Kadazans and Chinese in the mid-18th century had far-reaching consequences, eventually leading to the formation of the Sino community as a community with its own cultural identity. This community's emergence was significant enough to gain official recognition from the British government in 1951, a recognition that encompassed the Sino-Native sub-ethnic group, which by then had grown to a substantial population of 6,468 individuals.

The Sino population in North Borneo, known today as Sabah, stood out due to its size, surpassing some well-established ethnic groups in the region such as the Iranun and Tidong during that period. This prominence prompted significant developments in 1952 when the British government took the step of permitting the Sino community to seek indigenous status through native courts.

The trajectory of recognition and acknowledgment continued even after Malaysia's formation in 1963. Consequently, the Malaysian government categorised Malays, the natives of Sarawak and Sabah collectively as Bumiputera, a term denoting indigenous people.

=== Challenges and protection ===
Despite these recognitions, the status of Sino-Natives as a distinct group has faced ongoing challenges. Legal and administrative measures were established during the British colonial era and after Malaysia's formation to acknowledge and protect the Sino community's rights and cultural heritage within Sabah's diverse population.

One significant aspect of this recognition has been the issuance of native certificates, which grant individuals the status of being native to Sabah. These certificates are crucial for accessing certain rights and privileges afforded to indigenous communities. However, there have been instances of controversy and misuse surrounding the issuance of native certificates, particularly concerning non-natives acquiring these certificates through improper means.

Such challenges have raised concerns about the legitimacy and integrity of the native certificate system. The issue of non-natives obtaining native certificates has led to debates and discussions within the legal and administrative frameworks of Sabah. Efforts have been made to address these challenges and ensure that the native certificate system remains fair and just for genuine indigenous communities, including the Sino-Natives, who have a rightful claim to their cultural heritage and identity.

Chinese

Kadazan-Dusun

Murut

Regions in Sabah with notable populations of ethnic Chinese, Kadazan-Dusun, and Murut communities. While the exact number of individuals of Sino descent is not documented in the recent census, the higher concentrations of Sino heritage can be observed in the overlapping darker shaded areas, suggesting a correlation with intermarriages within these demographics.

== Identity ==
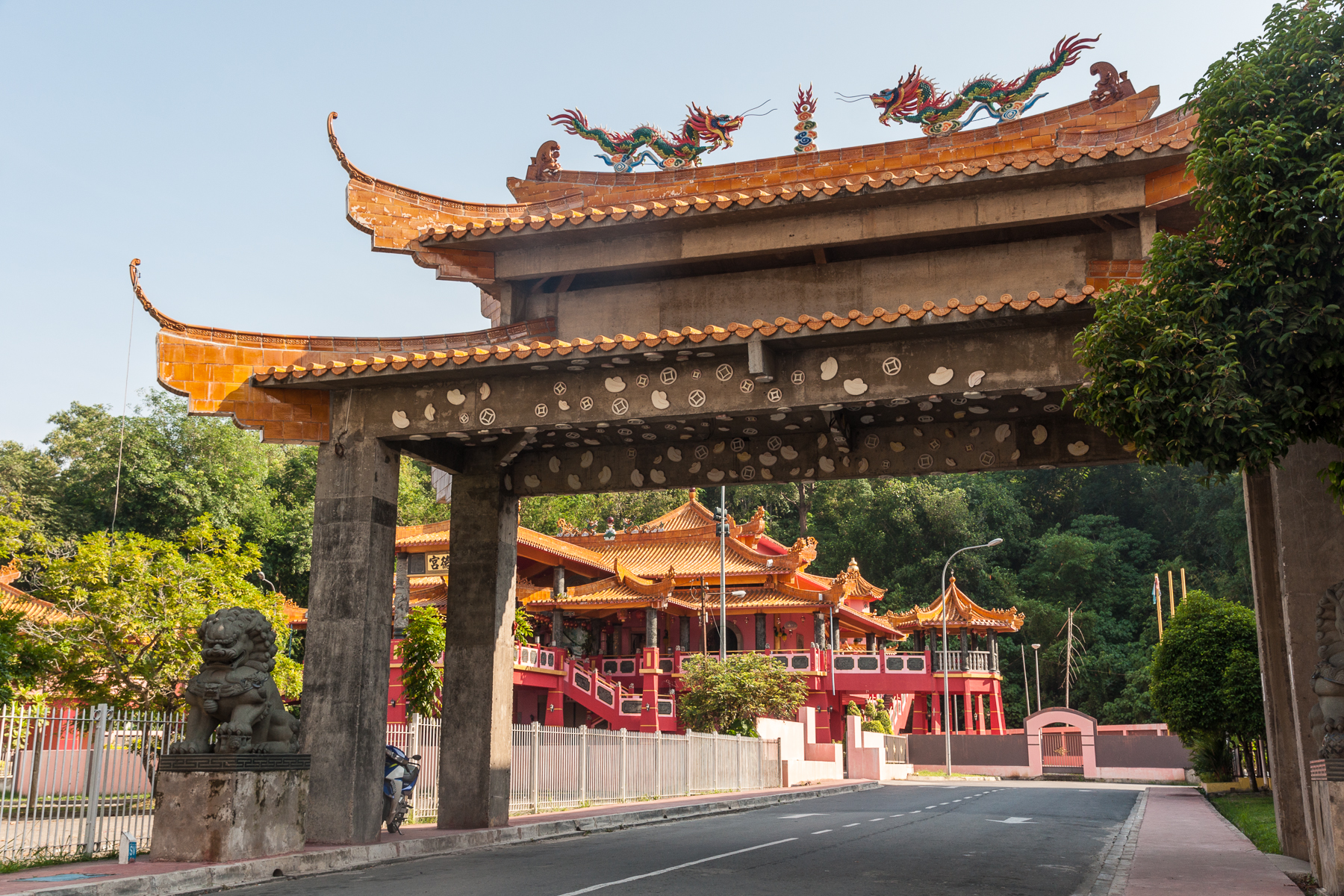
Jing Fu Chinese Temple in Donggongon, Penampang

=== Self-identification ===
In Sino-Native communities, self-identification varies significantly among individuals, reflecting a complex interplay of cultural heritage and personal identity. Some individuals strongly identify with their indigenous roots, while others lean towards their Chinese heritage. This variation in self-identification is influenced by factors such as family traditions, social environment and personal experiences.

The extent of this identification can vary, with some individuals feeling equally connected to both their native and Chinese roots. This dual identification allows them to integrate the cultural practices, languages and traditions of both heritages into their daily lives.

==== Native identity ====
Many individuals in Sino-Native communities identify predominantly with their native heritage. This is often due to the dominant cultural influence of one of their parents and the local environment in which they were raised. These individuals embrace indigenous customs, language and traditions and they may participate actively in community rituals and festivals. For them, their native identity is a source of pride and a significant part of their daily lives.

Several notable figures within the Kadazan society, including the late Datuk Rayner Fong Peng Loi (1908–1991), the late Datuk Richard Emmanuel Yapp, the late Datuk Frederick Jinu Tan (1938–2002) whom are all natives of Penampang and the late Datuk Amadeus Leong from Papar, originally bore full Chinese names but immersed themselves in Kadazan-Dusun culture. They were recognised for their proficiency in the native Kadazan/Dusun language, particularly the Kadazan dialect spoken widely in their hometowns of Penampang and Papar, alongside their significant contributions to the community.

==== Chinese identity ====
Conversely, many individuals in Sino-Native communities also feel a stronger connection to their Chinese ancestry. This identification can be influenced by familial ties, particularly when the Chinese heritage is emphasised within the household. These individuals might celebrate Chinese festivals, speak Chinese dialects and engage in cultural practices passed down from their Chinese ancestors.

On the other hand, the Sino community's ability to preserve Chinese cultural traditions, despite the relatively low to medium population of Chinese individuals in areas such as Ranau, Tambunan, Keningau, Tenom, Kota Marudu, Pitas and Kota Belud, is noteworthy. The Sino community's efforts to maintain cultural practices, languages, and customs ensure that Chinese heritage thrives and remains a visible connection to their ancestry, even within a predominantly indigenous population.

A prominent example is the late Datuk Liew Vui Keong (1960–2020), a native of Kota Belud with a full-blooded Chinese father and a mixed-blooded mother. Liew was multilingual, aside speaking his native Hakka dialect, he was also fluent in Cantonese, which he learned while serving as a member of parliament in Sandakan; Dusun and Bajau, reflecting his upbringing in a multiracial, multireligious and multilingual background. Additionally, he was fluent in Standard Mandarin, having attended a Chinese-medium primary school, as well as English and the national Malaysian language (particularly his native Sabahan vernacular as well as Kelantanese dialect which he learnt whilst he was schooling or working temporarily in that East Coast peninsular state during his youth by means of interacting with the local Kelantanese Malays as well as Siamese folks).

==== General assimilation ====
The evolving cultural identities of descendants from Sino-Native marriages depict a dynamic assimilation journey. Initially, the grandchildren of such unions tend to recognise their Chinese heritage, but with time, this connection may fade. This transformation can lead individuals to identify mainly as Kadazan-Dusuns or Muruts, despite having multiple Chinese ancestors in their family history.

In another perspective, the educational system has played a pivotal role in shaping cultural identities among individuals of Sino descent, even for those with distant or minimal Chinese ancestry. Some choose to embrace their Chinese heritage to varying degrees by attending Chinese-medium vernacular schools and engaging with Chinese culture. This phenomenon occurs despite their predominantly native ancestry, highlighting the significant influence of education in fostering cultural continuity and adaptation within diverse communities.

Similarly, ethnic Chinese individuals with ancestral connections to indigenous heritage are also can be found in modern-day Sabah. This multifaceted exploration illustrates the complex interplay and evolution of cultural fusion among descendants of Sino-Native unions.

== Naming system ==
The naming system of the Sino people in Malaysia is a testament to the complex interplay between heritage, identity and socio-political dynamics. It reflects their unique position as a mixed ethnicity with Bumiputera status and their adaptive strategies in maintaining their cultural identity while accessing necessary resources.

The traditional Sino naming convention gives priority to the Chinese surname, a pivotal aspect of their identity, especially considering that most of these unions historically involve Chinese men and indigenous women. This system incorporates both Chinese and native elements, reflecting their dual heritage. However, the necessity to align with Bumiputera rights has led many Sino individuals to alter their naming practices.

=== Buang Siang phenomenon ===
In response to limitations imposed on their rights by authorities, many Sino have discarded their Chinese surnames to preserve their Bumiputera status. This indigenisation practice is locally known as "Buang Siang", which involves changing their legal ethnicity to native.

The decision to retain or discard Chinese surnames is influenced by several factors. The historical significance of Chinese surnames, which can trace family ties back to imperial China, often contrasts with their relative detachment from local networks in Sabah. The Sino naming system provides a way to access native resources, particularly land resources, which are crucial for their socioeconomic well-being.

These changes in the naming system were driven by various socio-political factors and the need for the Sino-Native to negotiate their ethnic identity within the broader Malaysian context. The evolution of their naming conventions reflects their adaptive strategies in maintaining their unique cultural identity while navigating the complexities of their socio-political environment. The mixed ancestry of the Sino-Native has not only influenced their naming system but also permeated other aspects of their lives, resulting in a community that embodies a cultural synthesis.

== Culture ==
The unique cultural blend of the Sino-Native is a product of centuries-old intermarriages between Chinese immigrants and the indigenous peoples of Sabah. This intermingling of traditions, languages, customs and practices has given rise to a tapestry of identity within the Sino community.

Similar to the Peranakans, who emerged from intermarriages between Chinese and local communities in Southeast Asia, the Sino-Natives have developed their distinct cultural expressions, cuisine, art and traditions:

=== Major festivals and celebrations ===
Chinese New Year, a significant celebration for Sino-Natives, reflects their Chinese heritage through a variety of customs and rituals. The event features Lion dances, red decorations symbolising luck and prosperity and family reunions, all of which highlight the cultural importance of the festivity. The exchange of red envelopes, containing tokens of good fortune, emphasises the communal spirit and blessings associated with Chinese New Year. Additionally, traditional native dishes such as Bambangan, Tuhau, Losun and Linopot add a unique and culturally rich element to the celebrations among the Sino community.

Meanwhile, the Harvest Festival, deeply rooted in Sabah's indigenous traditions, pays homage to the region's agrarian heritage and spiritual connection to the land. This festival, also known as Kaamatan among the Kadazan-Dusun-Murut communities, is a time of thanksgiving for the bountiful harvests and blessings bestowed upon the community. Rituals like the Magavau ceremony, showcasing traditional dances such as the Sumazau, and the communal feasting on local delicacies like Hinava (marinated raw fish) and Tuhau.

The celebration of Christmas as well as Easter among the Christian majority Sino-Natives adds colours to their cultural heritage. It merges Western religious traditions with Chinese and indigenous customs, forming a unique identity. During each of these annual festive seasons, families decorate their homes and seasonal practices such as Yuletide gift exchanging, Easter egg gifting and engaging in church services, mirroring many of the practices of oher fellow Christian communities worldwide.

Additionally, Sabah's cultural landscape includes a smaller Sino-Native Muslim community that celebrates Eid al-Fitr as well as Eid al-Adha, Mawlid and many more other Muslim holidays and observances.

=== Ancestral customs and indigenous practices ===
Certain families within the Sino-Native community engage in grave worship, also called Qingming, which usually occurs towards the end of March or the beginning of April. This ritual involves cleaning the graves of their ancestors and presenting offerings such as cooked meals, fruits, traditional sweets, apparel, footwear and symbolic paper money to honour their spirits. It's a time when family members and relatives come together to pay respect to their ancestors.

Some Sino families also adheres to indigenous customs such as Sogit, a system of fines for cultural transgressions. These fines, symbolised by animals, vary based on the seriousness of the offence and aim to maintain communal harmony. Regarding death customs, the use of "tuah" clothing denotes respect, with the attire color and type reflecting the relationship and age of the deceased. This attire is worn for one or two months as a gesture of reverence, during which visits to other households are avoided as a sign of respect.

== Recognition of the Sino community in Sabah ==
=== Legal recognition and definition ===
The legal and indigenous status of Sino-Natives in Sabah is defined in Section 2 (The Interpretation and Definition of Native) Cap 64 Act, which was introduced in 1952 by the Colonial Administration. According to this act, a Sino-Native is described as "one at least of whose parents or ancestors is or was a native." This definition aims to acknowledge the diverse heritage of individuals with Chinese and indigenous ancestry.

Section 3(1) of the act outlines the process for obtaining a Surat Anak Negeri (Native Certificate) through application to a native court. These courts have the authority to grant native status to qualifying Sino-native individuals, issuing them the certificate that affirms their native identity in Sabah. This status grants them access to the protection and privileges afforded to native inhabitants of the region.

=== Native title and land inheritance challenges ===
Recently, the issue of hybrid communities has become prominent, particularly concerning native rights and land inheritance under Native Title. These land titles, issued by the Lands Office since the Land Ordinance of 1903, were intended to reserve land exclusively for native use. Foreigners and non-native local populations, including the Chinese, were prohibited from purchasing such land. However, the law also stated that the offspring of a mixed marriage between a native and a non-native, such as a Chinese, would be automatically recognised as native, resulting in the categorisation of Sino-Native.

Because Native Land titles could only be transacted between natives, they were not valued at open market prices and were therefore considered much cheaper. This created an incentive for individuals to be categorised as native to qualify for these benefits. By the 1980s, many categorised under this group encountered problems in transferring their Native Title properties to the next generation. Particularly affected were those with a Chinese ancestor and a native female ancestor, often retaining Chinese surnames, whose native status was questioned and challenged by the state administration. Consequently, they were deemed ineligible to inherit properties reserved under Native Title. Under these circumstances, the Sino-Native identity faced significant challenges and became a contested issue.

=== Three-generation formula ===
However, there have been challenges and debates regarding the recognition and classification of the Sino community. One of the contentious issues revolves around the three-generation formula, which limits the status of a Sino KDM (KadazanDusun Murut) to three generations. This formula has been criticised for potentially undermining the rights and identity of individuals of Sino descent, especially considering the continuous lineage of heritage.

=== Efforts for recognition ===
Efforts have been made to address these challenges and ensure proper recognition of the Sino community. For instance, there have been discussions within the Sabah State Assembly to recognise Sino-Natives according to their ethnic background, allowing children of mixed marriages between Chinese and native individuals to be registered with specific ethnic identities such as Sino-Kadazan, Sino-Dusun, Sino-Murut and others. This includes addressing issues related to land ownership, identity registration and access to education.

The government has also shown willingness to review and address the concerns of the Sino community. Statements from government officials, including the chief minister of Sabah, indicate a commitment to reevaluate the restoration of Sino identity as natives and streamline procedures related to ethnic recognition during registration processes.

The recognition of the Sino community in Sabah is an ongoing process that involves legal, political, and societal considerations. Efforts are being made to ensure that individuals of Sino descent are properly acknowledged and categorised within the state's legal and cultural frameworks, reflecting the diverse and rich heritage of the Sabahan population.

== In popular culture ==
- I Love Sino Kadazan, a song released in 2015, gained recognition for its depiction of Sino-Kadazan girls and the cultural richness of Sabah. Sung in Hakka, the song's lyrics express affection for Sino-Kadazan girls and their appeal. As of 2024, the song has garnered over 466,000 views on YouTube.
- The Rise of Lion, released on 2 June 2022, explores the unique multicultural aspect of lion dance troupes in Sabah. The movie follows a young Sino-Kadazan boy named JJ who strives to rejuvenate a once-renowned lion dance team in Kota Kinabalu, blending traditional Chinese lion dance with indigenous Sabahan elements like the Magunatip dance and Kulintanggan gong.

== See also ==
- Demographics of Sabah
- Peranakan
- Chindian
- Sangley
