= Tiga Island National Park =

Malaysian marine park

Tiga Island Park
- IUCN category II (national park)
- Location within Borneo
- Location: Sabah, Malaysia
- Coordinates: 5°43′N 115°39′E
- Area: 158 km^{2} (61 sq mi)
- Established: 1978
- Governing body: Sabah Parks

Tiga Island Park was established in 1978, although the area has been under protection as a forest reserve since 1933. It is located north of Kuala Penyu, opposite the swampy Klias Peninsula, in Sabah, Malaysia.

The park covers 158 square kilometres of mostly ocean, containing the 3 islands of Tiga, Kalampunian Besar and Kalampunian Damit. The islands were formed in 1897 by the eruption of mud volcanos.

Tiga Island is now covered in dense vegetation; however volcanic activity continues in the form of bubbling mud and methane gas venting, although the last major outpouring of mud was in the early 1960s.

Kalampunian Besar Island, also known as Sandbank Island, is now little more than a sandbar, eroded away by wave action. Known for its sugar-white sands and clear waters, it is popular for scuba diving and snorkelling.

Kalampunian Damit Island, also known as Snake Island, is little more than a large rock. It is known as a mating location for venomous sea snakes.

Tiga Island Park is administered by Sabah Parks.

== See also ==
- List of national parks of Malaysia
