= Kuala Penyu District =

Kuala Penyu District Daerah Kuala Penyu
- District
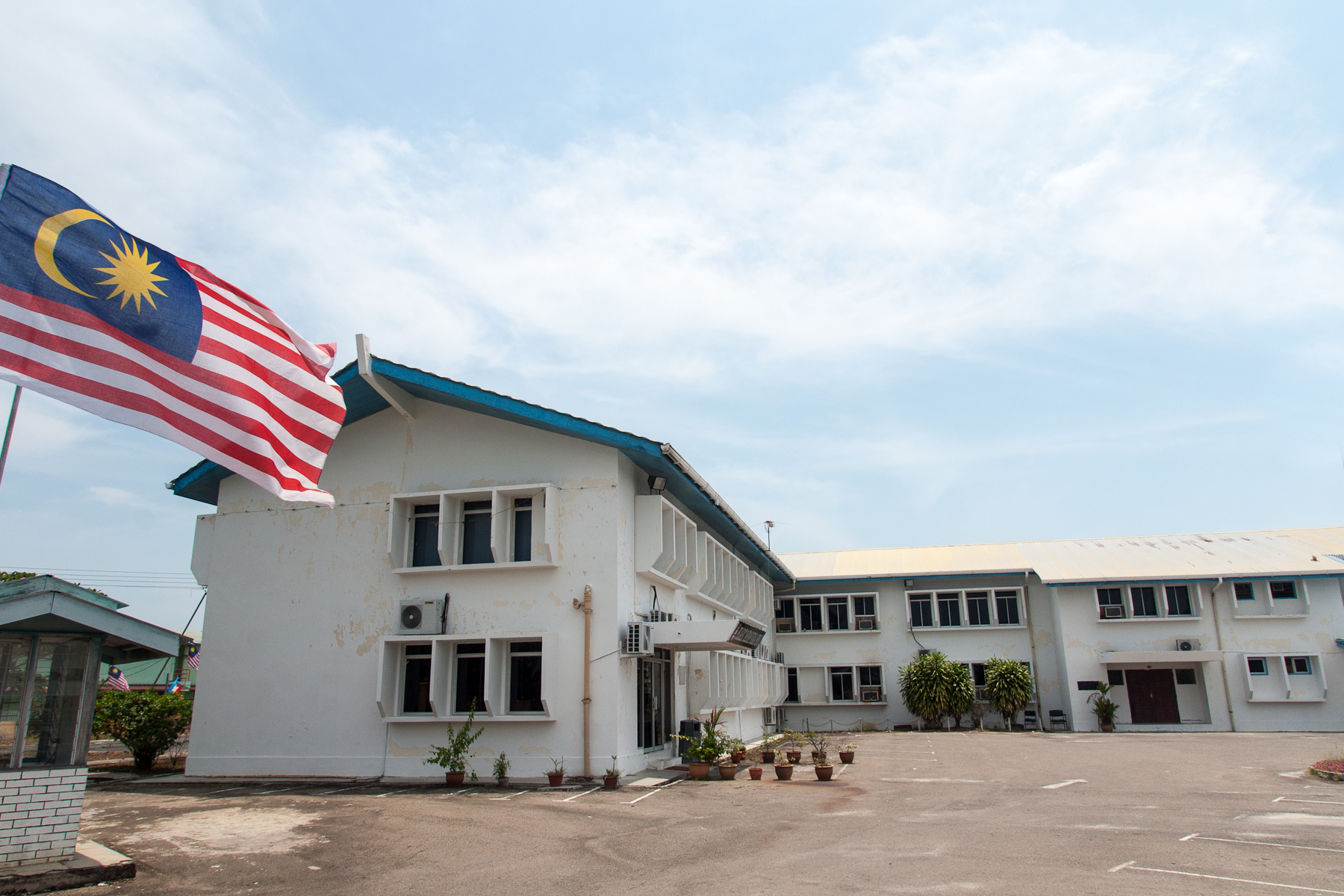
- Kuala Penyu District office.

- Seal

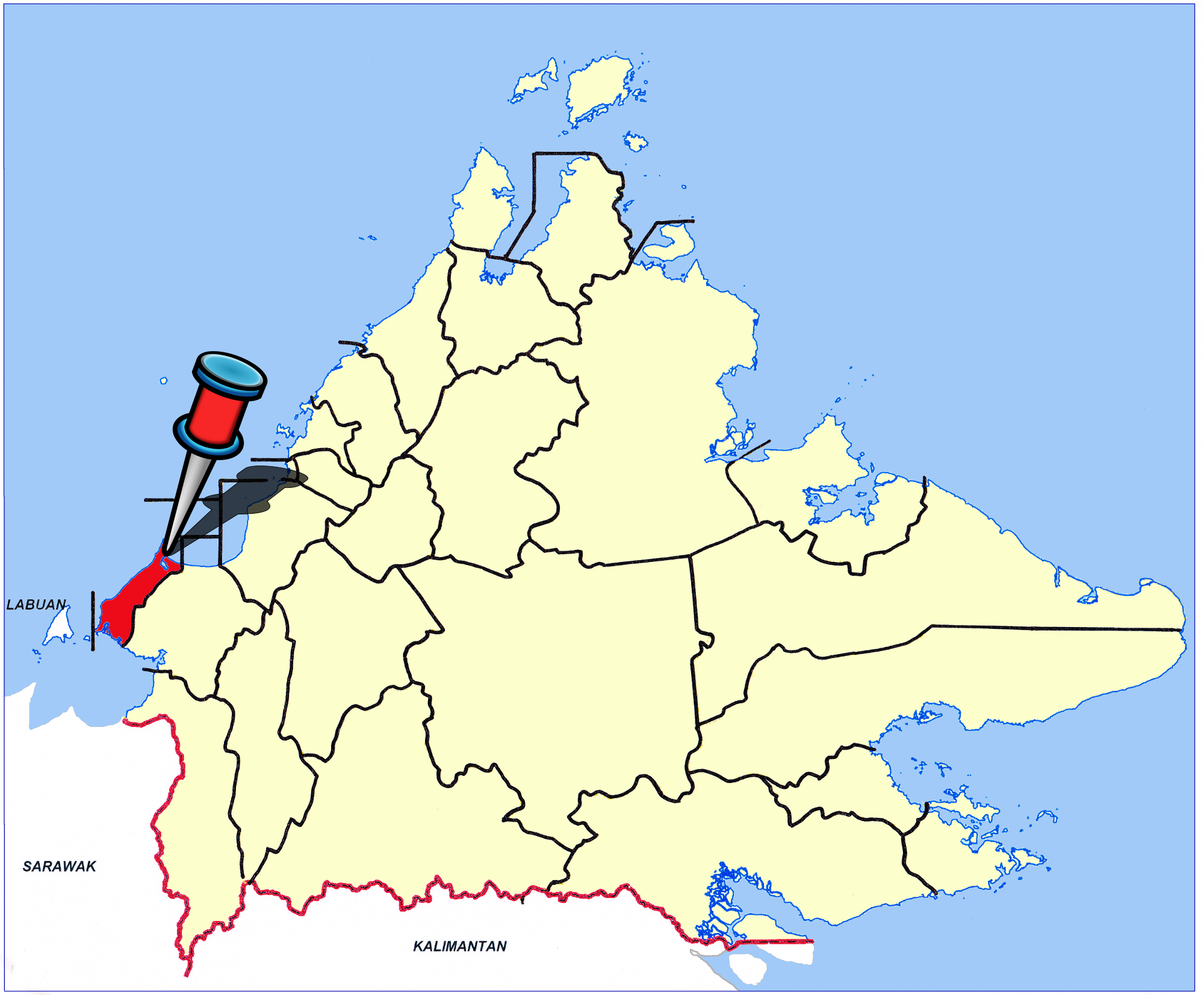
- Coordinates: 5°34′12.72″N 115°35′38.39″E
- Country: Malaysia
- State: Sabah
- Division: Interior
- Capital: Kuala Penyu

Government
  - District Officer: Nelson Domil Oluk

Area
  - Total: 453 km^{2} (175 sq mi)

Population (2016)
  - Total: 20,579
- Website: mdkualapenyu.sbh.gov.my pdkualapenyu.sbh.gov.my

Map of Kuala Penyu District

The Kuala Penyu District (Malay: Daerah Kuala Penyu) is an administrative district in the Malaysian state of Sabah, part of the Interior Division which includes the districts of Beaufort, Keningau, Kuala Penyu, Nabawan, Sipitang, Tambunan and Tenom. The capital of the district is in Kuala Penyu Town.

== Etymology ==
The district called Kuala Penyu was not originate from the area being a primary landing site for the marine animal but rather it derived from a group stones forming types of "Turtle" (Malay: Penyu) situated at river bank or Kuala.

== History ==
Kuala Penyu was declared as full district in the year 1975 after being a sub-district of Beaufort District. The district was also established as focal point for administrative and business centre. In early 60s this area was popularly known as "Sitompok" whereby it refers to a group of stones.

== Demographics ==
The population of the Kuala Penyu district according to the last census in the year 2010 is 18,958 inhabitants and consists mainly of Kadazan or Dusun Tatana, which make up the largest ethnic group. There are also a significant number of illegal immigrants from the nearby southern Philippines, mainly from Sulu Archipelago and Mindanao which are not included in the population statistics.

== Geography ==
Kuala Penyu located at the western part of Sabah. It sits close to the coastal, by South China Sea, Brunei Bay and Kimanis Bay. Kuala Penyu only shared border with two district in Sabah, being Beaufort and Membakut District to the southeast. Nearby island is the federal territory of Malaysia, Labuan, and the island that the district owns, Pulau Tiga National Park.

The district topography is almost mostly flat and featuring field by padi, with a known river, namely Klias River, are filled with mangrove swamp.

== Tourism ==
It is one of the gateways to Pulau Tiga National Park, where Survivor: Borneo was set. Kuala Penyu is also famous for its beaches, especially Tempurung beach, Sawangan beach and Sungai Labuan Waterfront. Sungai Labuan, as the name implies was taken from the name of a river flowing in the heart of Kuala Penyu. Pesta Rumbia is a special celebration for "Sago" trees which are only planted widely in the district. This festive season targets to promote "sago" as traditional food and multi purpose product with full of nutrition. More recently Kuala Penyu's surrounding long, deserted beaches have brought in both international and local tourists to the area. Positioned perfectly for a sun rise, or sunset, depending on which side of the peninsular you are, the location is proving to be a 'weekend hot spot' for those escaping the city life. In addition, Kuala Penyu district also hosts a minor seaport or jetty and a major gateway to the island destination of Labuan through the town of Menumbok where ro-ro ferries depart and arrive for the daily Labuan-Sabah ferry crossings.

== Gallery ==
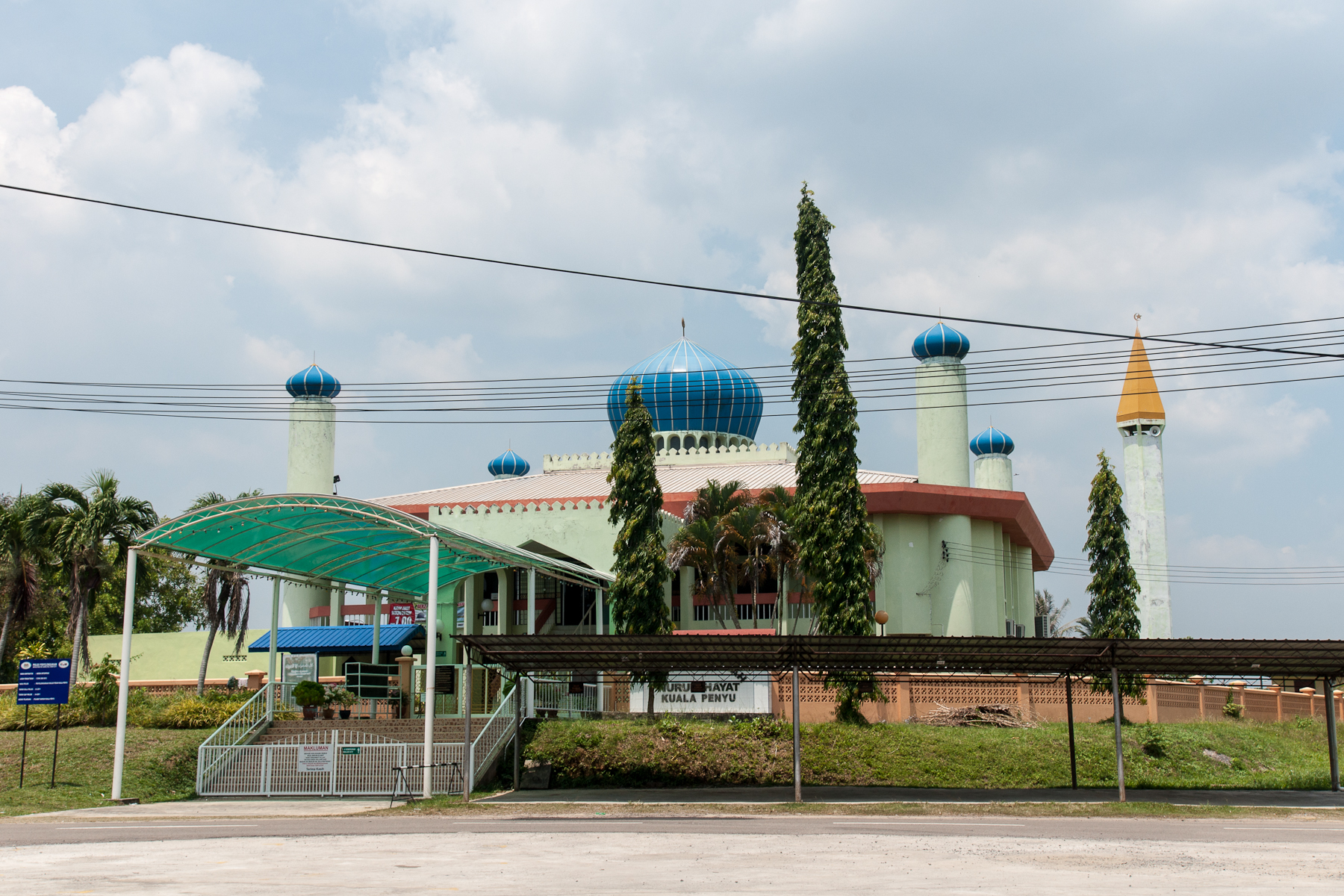
Kuala Penyu Mosque.

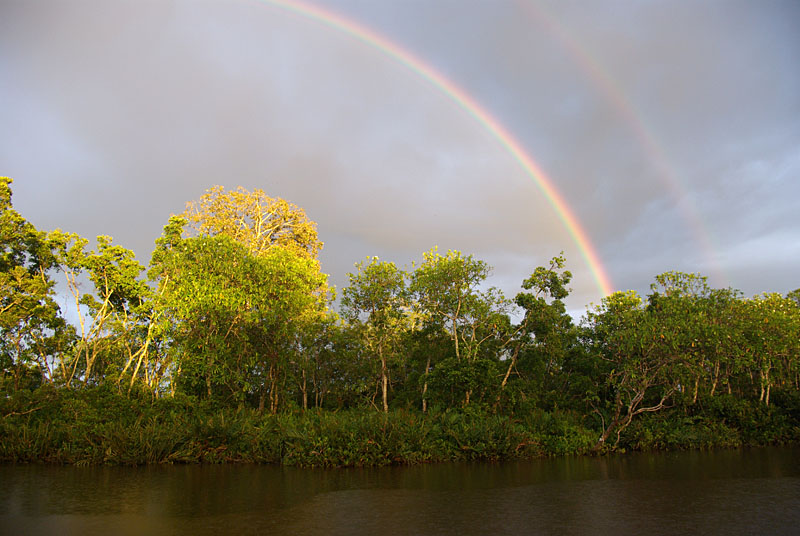
Rainbow in Klias Wetlands.

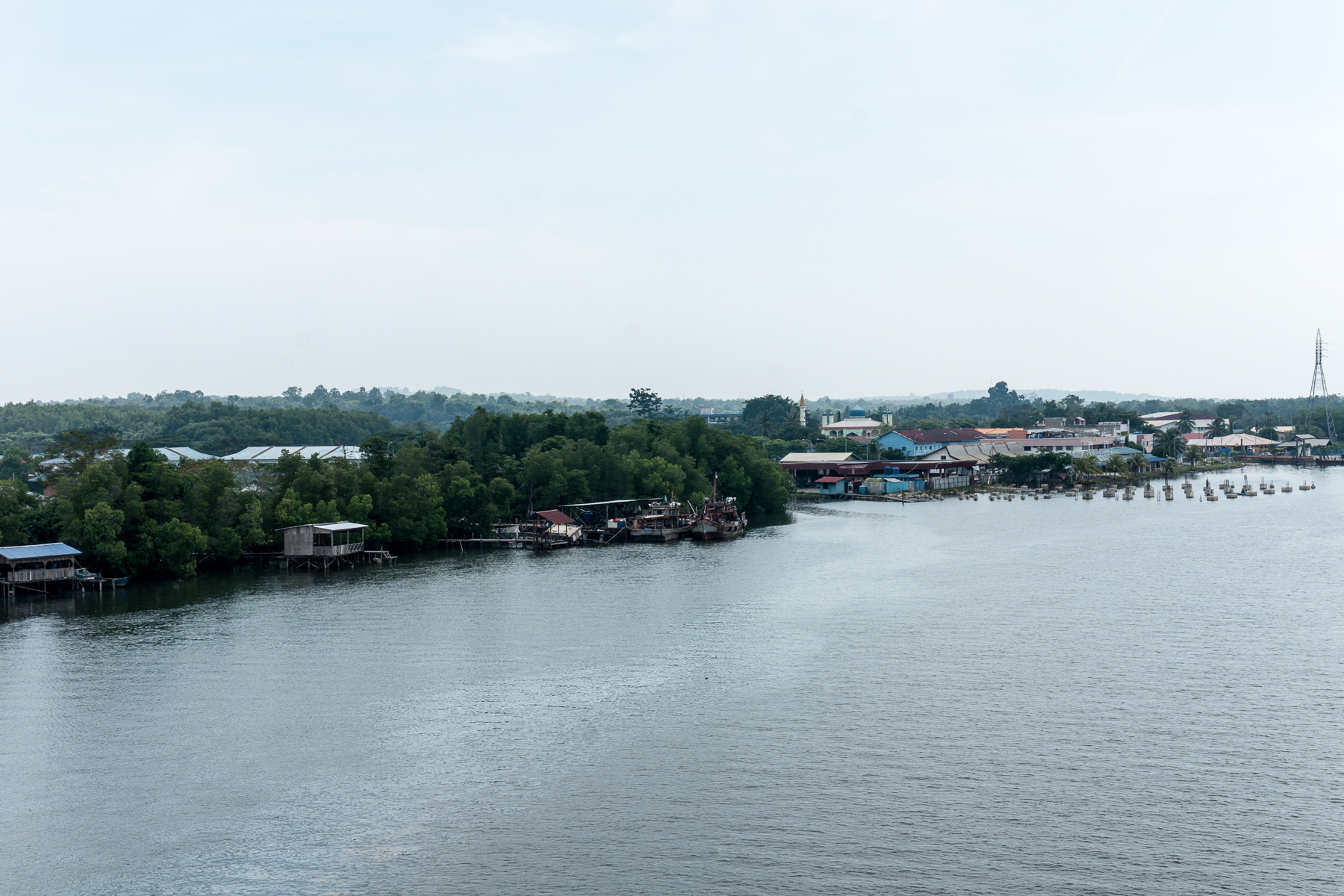
Sitompok River.

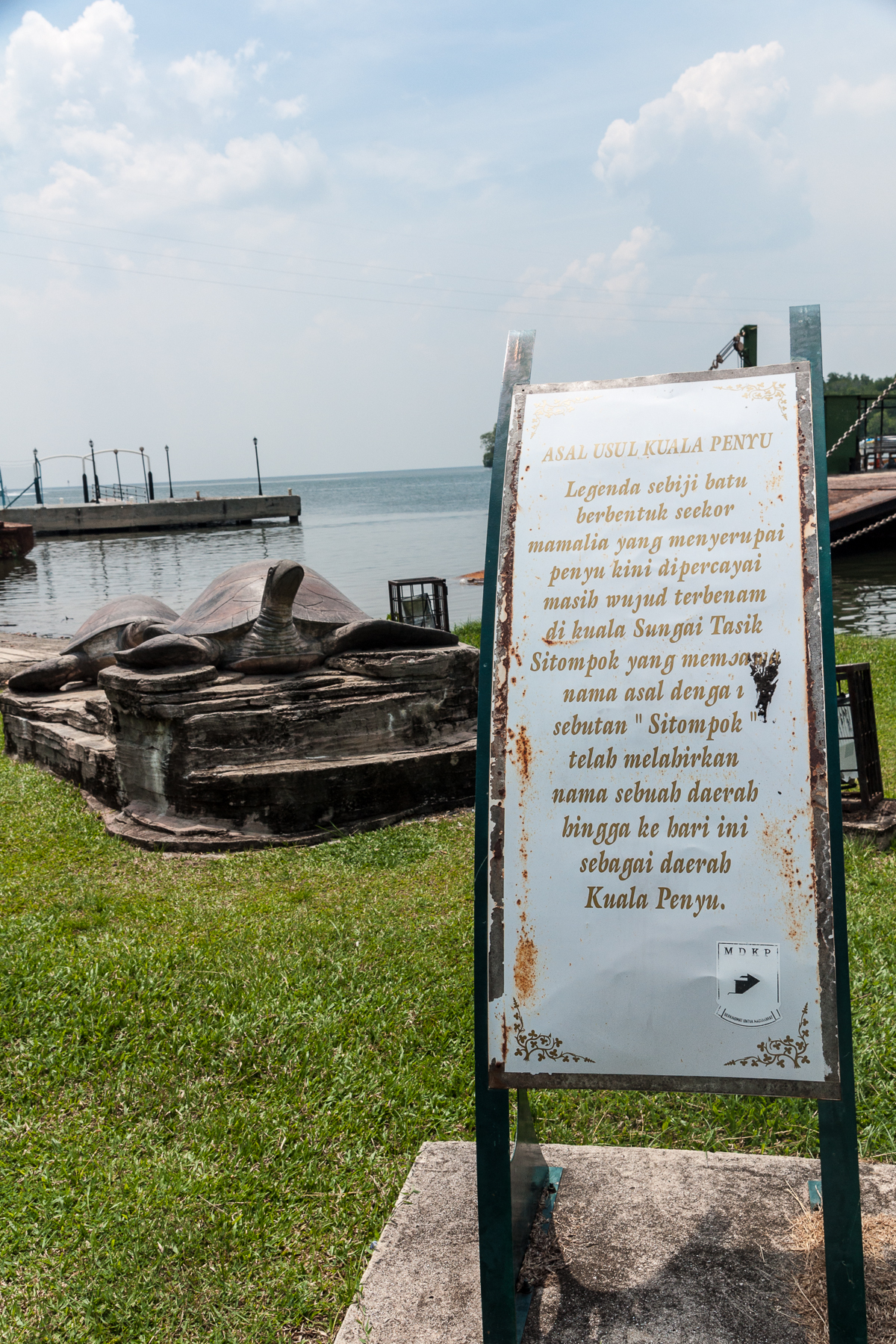
A historical inscription of the origin of the Kuala Penyu name near the Sitompok River.

== See also ==
- Districts of Malaysia
