= 2016 Malaysian haze =

Forest fires in Sabah, Malaysia

2016 Sabah forest fires
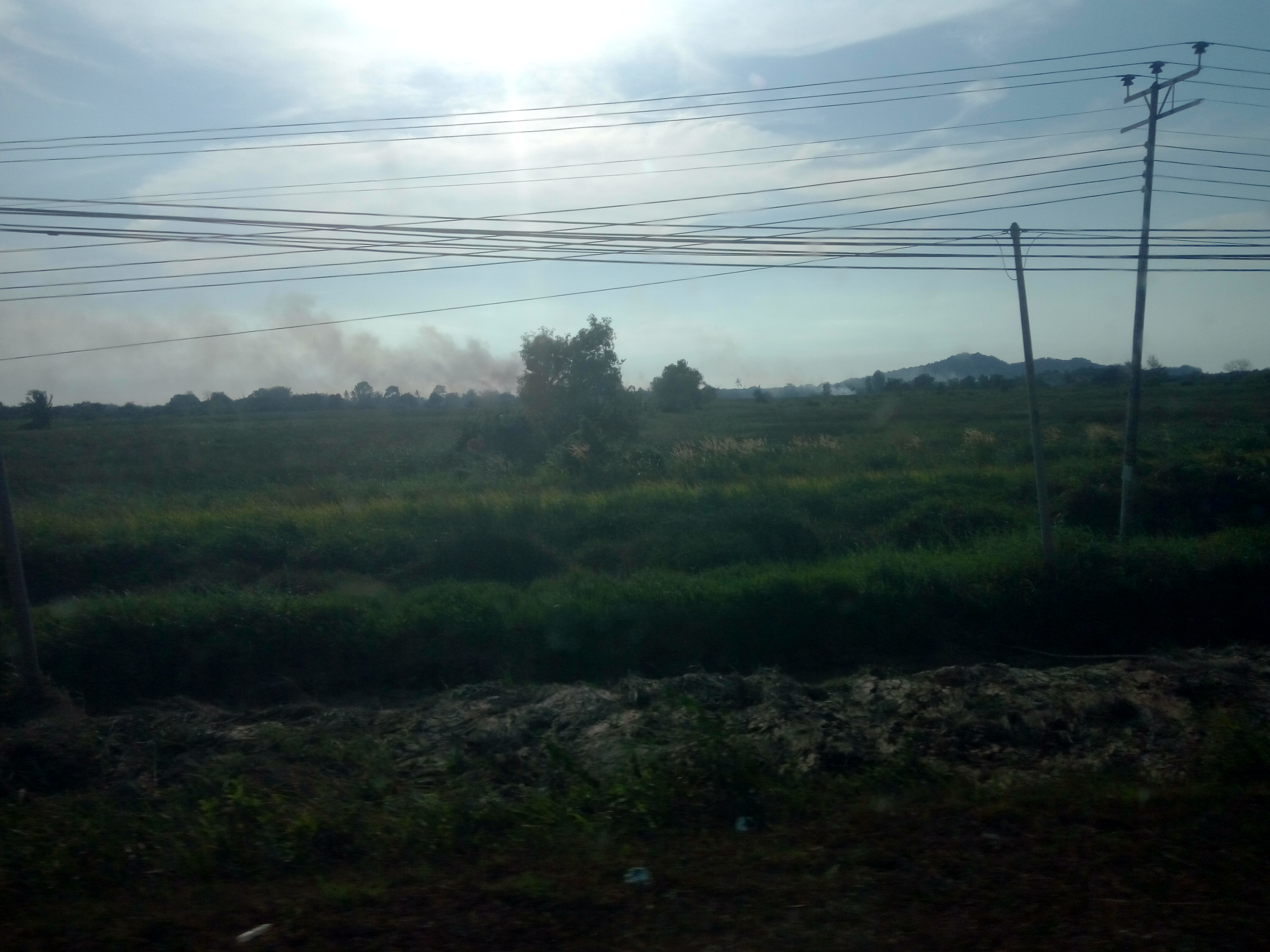
- Forest fires sets by irresponsible farmers in the West Coast Division has been blamed for the increase of hotspots in Sabah, such as this which was taken on 16 March 2016.
- Date: 27 March – 13 April
- Location: Sabah, Malaysia
- Cause: Fire sets by arsonists
- Property damage: RM100 million: 3,000 hectares of Binsuluk Forest Reserve and almost 10,000 hectares of alienated lands have been destroyed in eight districts; Some 660 hectares destroyed in Trusmadi Forest Reserve

Starting in mid-March 2015 several fires caused part of Sabah, especially in the West Coast Division to be blanketed by haze.

== Causes ==
The fires became worse due to the effects of the 2014–16 El Niño event. Natural Resource and Environment Minister Wan Junaidi Tuanku Jaafar said open burning by farmers are the main cause of the fire and haze. Meanwhile, the Beaufort District Officer Mohd Shaid Othman said that the fires were caused by greedy hunters who wanted to search for deer easily. This was supported by Sabah Forestry Department (SFD) findings. The SFD has confirmed that arsonists were behind the forest fires that burned the Trusmadi and Binsuluk Forest Reserves, which blanketed the Sabah West Coast with haze. However, the Sabah Wildlife Department (SWD) dismissed the claims of the Beaufort District Officer as the areas has poor presence of animals. While Sabah Minister of Tourism Masidi Manjun also blamed greedy hunters as well some irresponsible smokers that like to threw their cigarettes anywhere.

== Effects ==
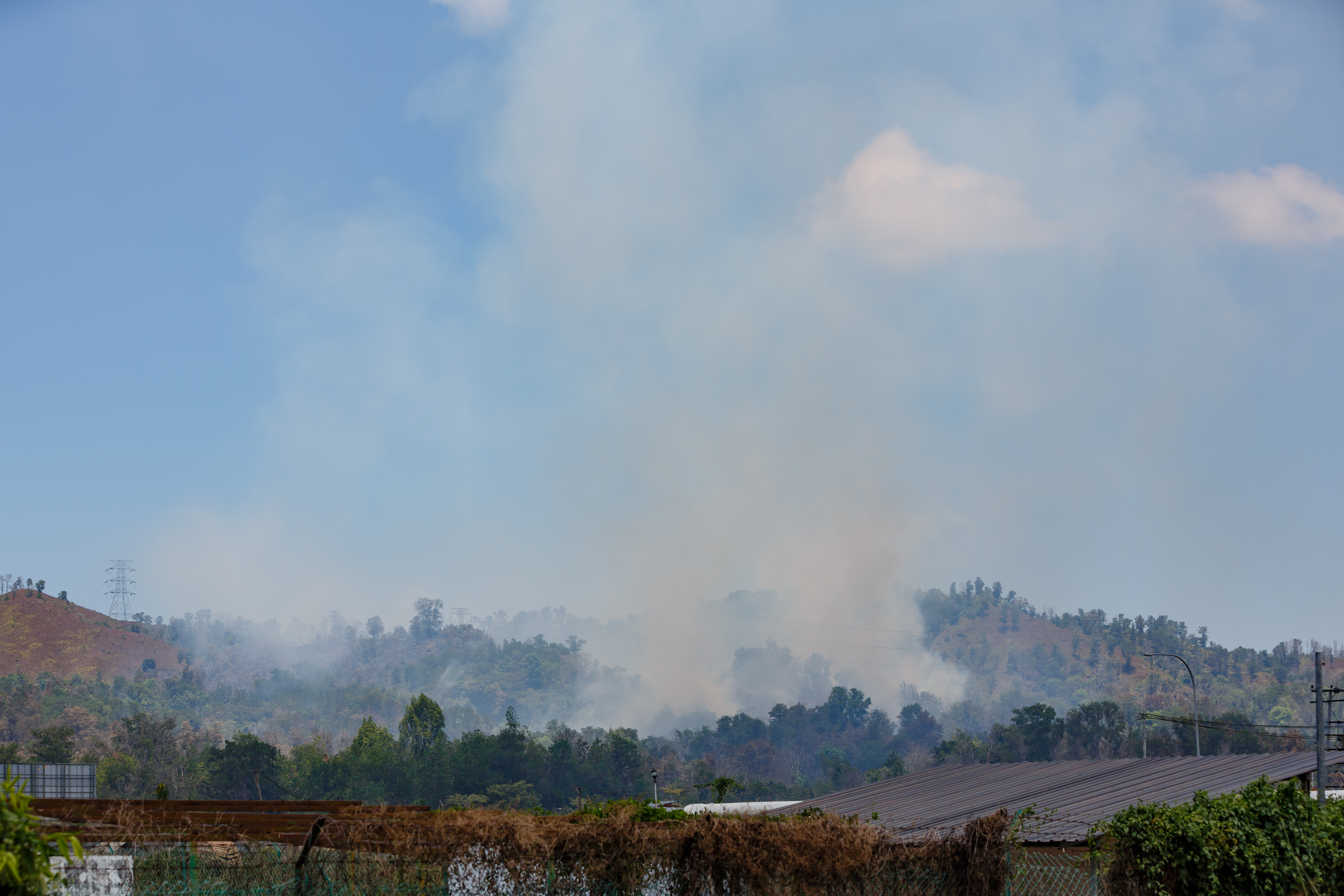
Forest fires in Kota Kinabalu on 15 March 2016.

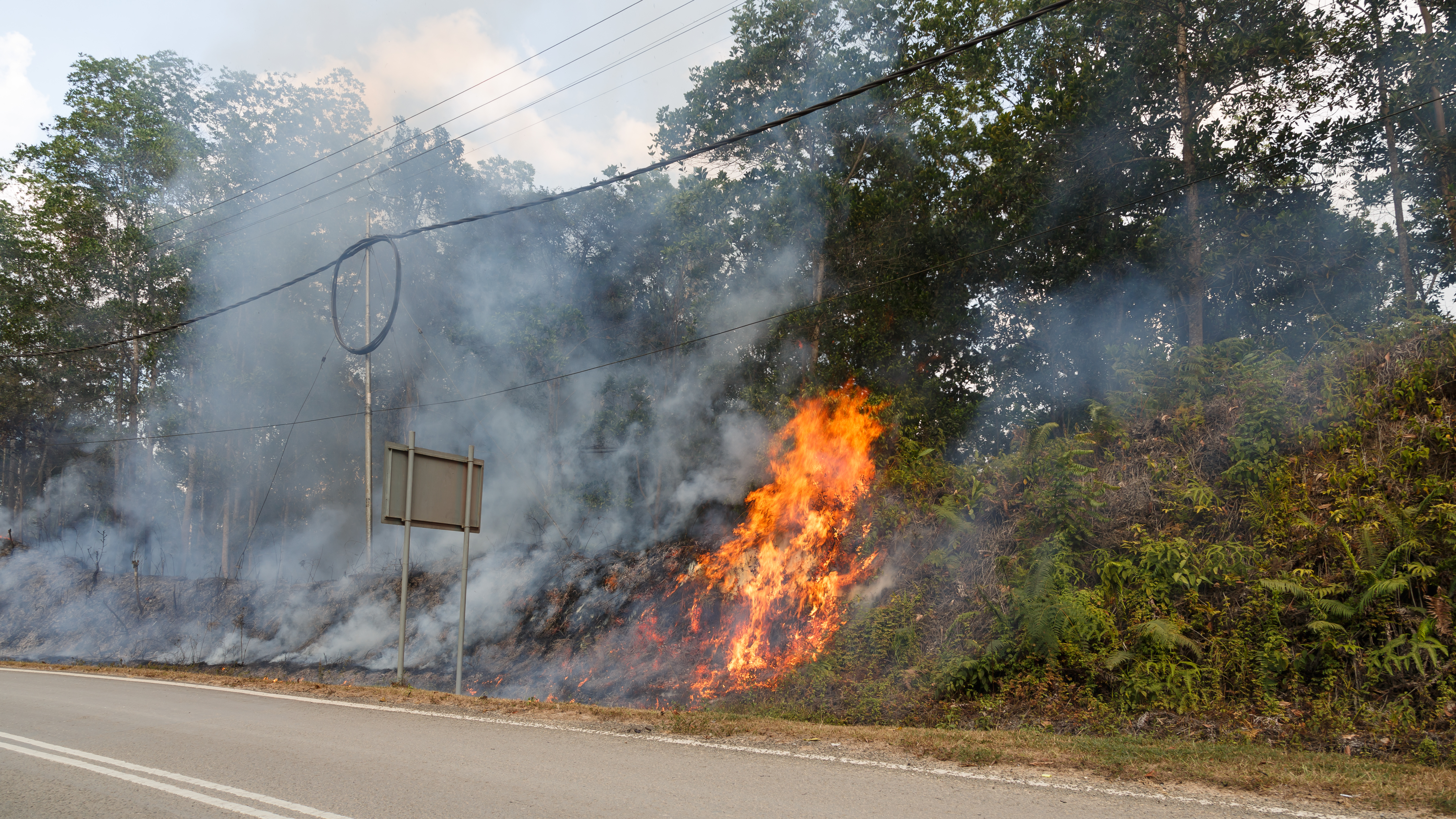
Bush fires beside a road in Tambunan in the Interior Division on 23 March 2016.

The forest fires have resulted in the closing of 77 schools in the West Coast Division with effect to health with the increase in respiratory related illness. In addition, 3,000 hectares of Binsuluk Forest Reserve and almost 10,000 hectares of alienated lands have been destroyed in eight districts including Keningau, Beaufort and Sook being the most affected. While the fires in the Trusmadi Forest Reserve destroyed some 660 hectares.

== Responses ==
Sabah Chief Minister Musa Aman has directed any relevant authorities to remain vigilant to any emergency situation while reminding the public to stop any open burning that would worsen the situation and to limit their outdoor activities during the haze. Firefighters from Sabah, Sarawak and Labuan branch of Malaysian Fire and Rescue Department have been instructed to combat the fire. After seeing the condition, firefighters decided to use aerial firefighting beside fighting it in the ground using nearby water sources. The haze also made the Sabah state government urging the Ministry of Science, Technology and Innovation for cloud seeding as air quality continued to be worsened. Replying to the request, The Malaysian Meteorological Department (MetMalaysia) begun cloud seeding operation on 7 April using the Royal Malaysian Air Force (RMAF) aircraft which been departed from Labuan Base. On 9 April, the Minister of Science, Technology and Innovation Madius Tangau said more rain will be expected to come to Sabah and any further cloud seeding are not necessary as a cloud seeding operation had earlier been carried out using the RMAF aircraft but only managed to trigger rain for 30 minutes as there was insufficient towering cumulus. As of 12 April, Sabah Meteorological acting director Lim Ze Hui stated that "most areas in Sabah have received rains with the setting in of the inter-monsoon over the weekend".

== Aftermath ==
All schools were reopened on 6 April. The fires was fully recovered on 3 April with firefighters took eight days to put out, while haze fully disappeared on 13 April. After the forest fires, the Minister of Science, Technology and Innovation Madius Tangau has present his solution on the issues to prevent it from recurring in the future as "prevention is much better than to cure". As an appreciation to all firefighters involved in the operation, the Malaysian main private media company, Media Prima has presented a total of RM26,000 aid.

== See also ==
- Environmental issues in Malaysia
