= Klias Peninsula =

Peninsula in Sabah, Malaysia

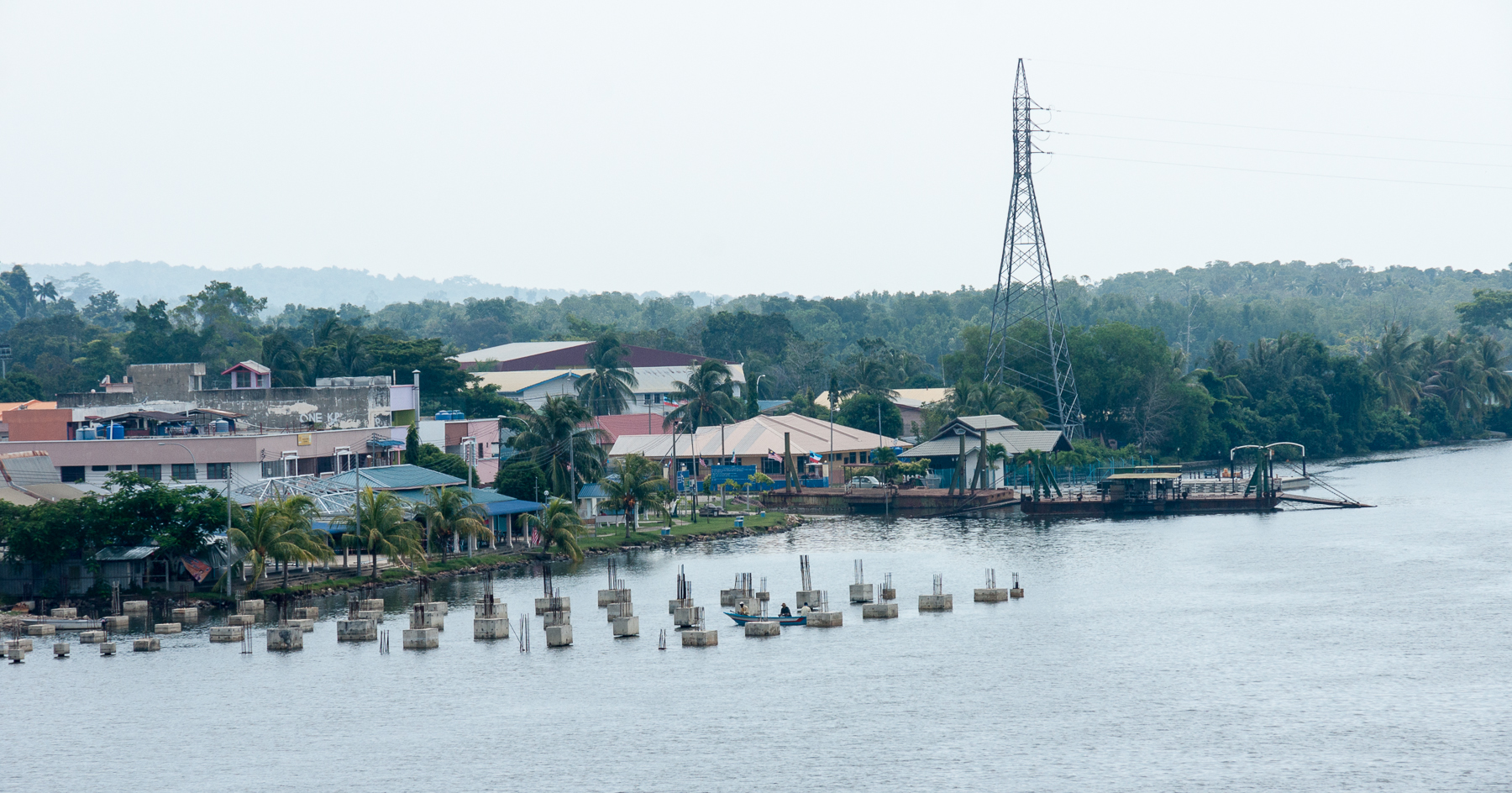
- Kuala Penyu, a town on the Klias Peninsula
- Location of Klias Peninsula in Sabah
- Location of Klias Peninsula in Malaysia
- Etymology: Semenanjung Klias

Geography
- Location: Interior Division
- Coordinates: 5°23′9″N 115°34′46″E
- Archipelago: Maritime Southeast Asia
- Adjacent to: South China Sea

Administration
- Malaysia
- State: Sabah

The Klias Peninsula (Malay: Semenanjung Klias) is a peninsula in the west of Sabah, Malaysia. It consists of coastal wetlands, the largest mangrove and nipa swamp area on Sabah's west coast, serving as a major nurturing ground for fisheries resources in the Brunei and Kimanis Bays.

== Geology ==
Miocene cobble conglomerates deposited in a tidally-influenced channel define a major sequence boundary exposed on the peninsula that can be correlated to paleo-shelf edge gorges imaged offshore on seismic data. Recent beach deposits on the area at 20 metre elevation indicate youthful uplift which offer a stellar example of drainage capture and facies variability in an active tropical foreland basin.

== Climate and biodiversity ==
The peninsula coastal area comprising the Kuala Penyu and Beaufort Districts generally received mean annual rainfall ranging from 2,000 millimetres to 2,500 millimetres while towards the east annual rainfall reached between 2,500 millimetres and 3,000 millimetres. It consists of four forest reserve areas of Binsuluk, Klias, Menumbok and Padas Damit with much of its coastline is lined with mangroves. The area supports a large population of water birds as well as proboscis monkeys and 134 tree species from 59 families.
