= Kimanis Bay =

Bay on the west coast of Sabah, Malaysia, Borneo

- Malay: Teluk Kimanis
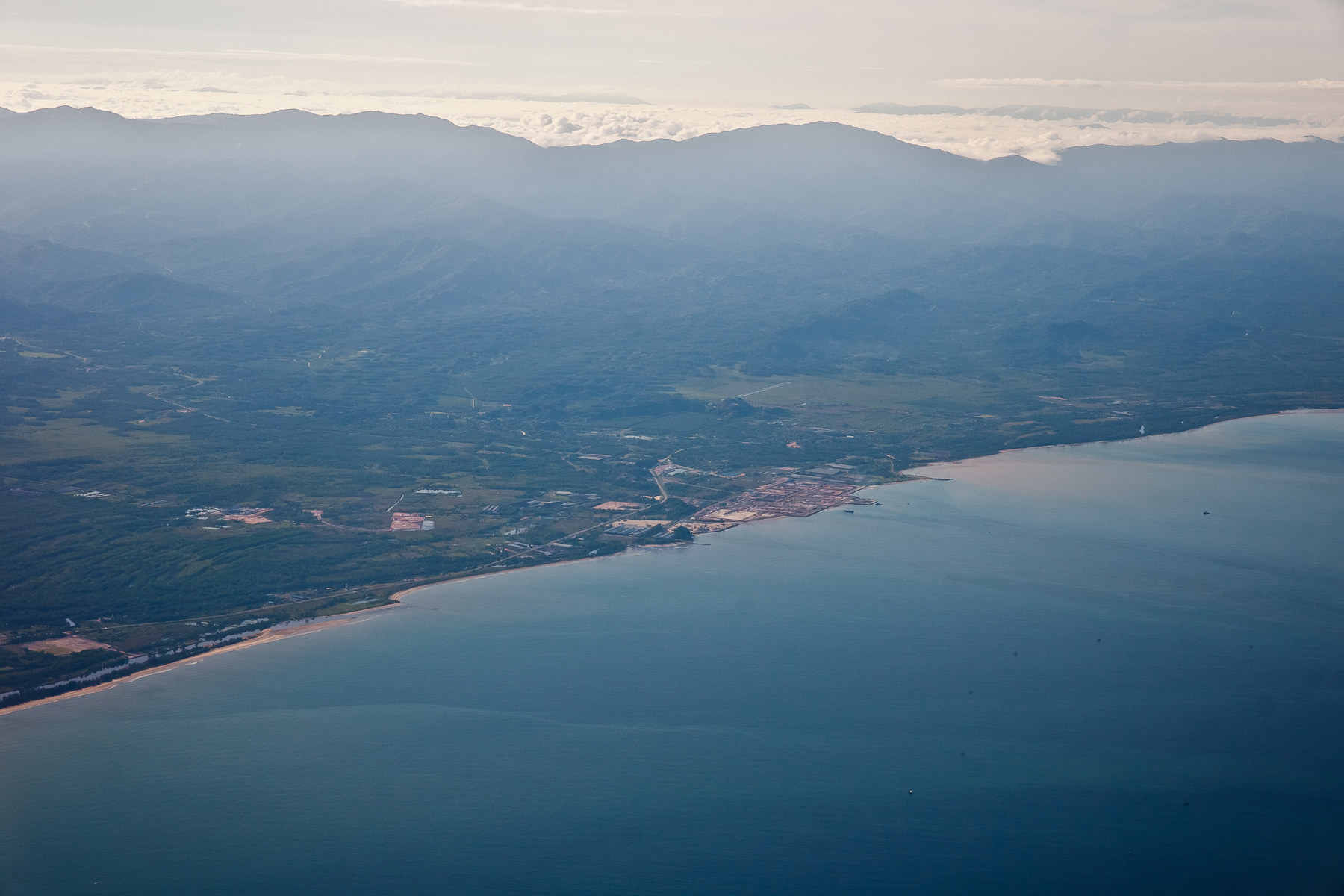
- Aerial View of Sabah Oil and Gas Terminal.

- Location within Malaysia Kimanis Bay (Malaysia)
- Location: Papar District, West Coast Division, Sabah, Malaysia
- Coordinates: 5°39′0″N 115°45′0″E
- Type: Bay
- Part of: South China Sea
- River sources: Sungai Penyu
- Max. length: 57 kilometres (35 mi)
- Max. width: 35 kilometres (22 mi)
- Surface area: 450 square kilometres (170 sq mi)
- Islands: Pulau Tiga
- Settlements: Kimanis

Kimanis Bay (Malay: Teluk Kimanis) is a bay on the west coast of the island of Borneo. It is a part of Malaysian state of Sabah and connects to the South China Sea. Administratively, it belongs to Papar District in the West Coast Division.

== Geography ==
The bay covers an area of approximately 450 km^{2}. The coastline extends in a wide arc from Cape Nosong to Cape Papar. In front of the bay is the island of Pulau Tiga. The coastline is predominantly not forested, with agricultural use.

== History ==
The name of the bay is derived from the settlement of Kimanis, the former capital of Ellena colony. The name Kimanis Bay can already be found on a map of British North Borneo from 1899 published by the North Borneo Chartered Company.

== Sabah-Sarawak Integrated Oil and Gas Project ==
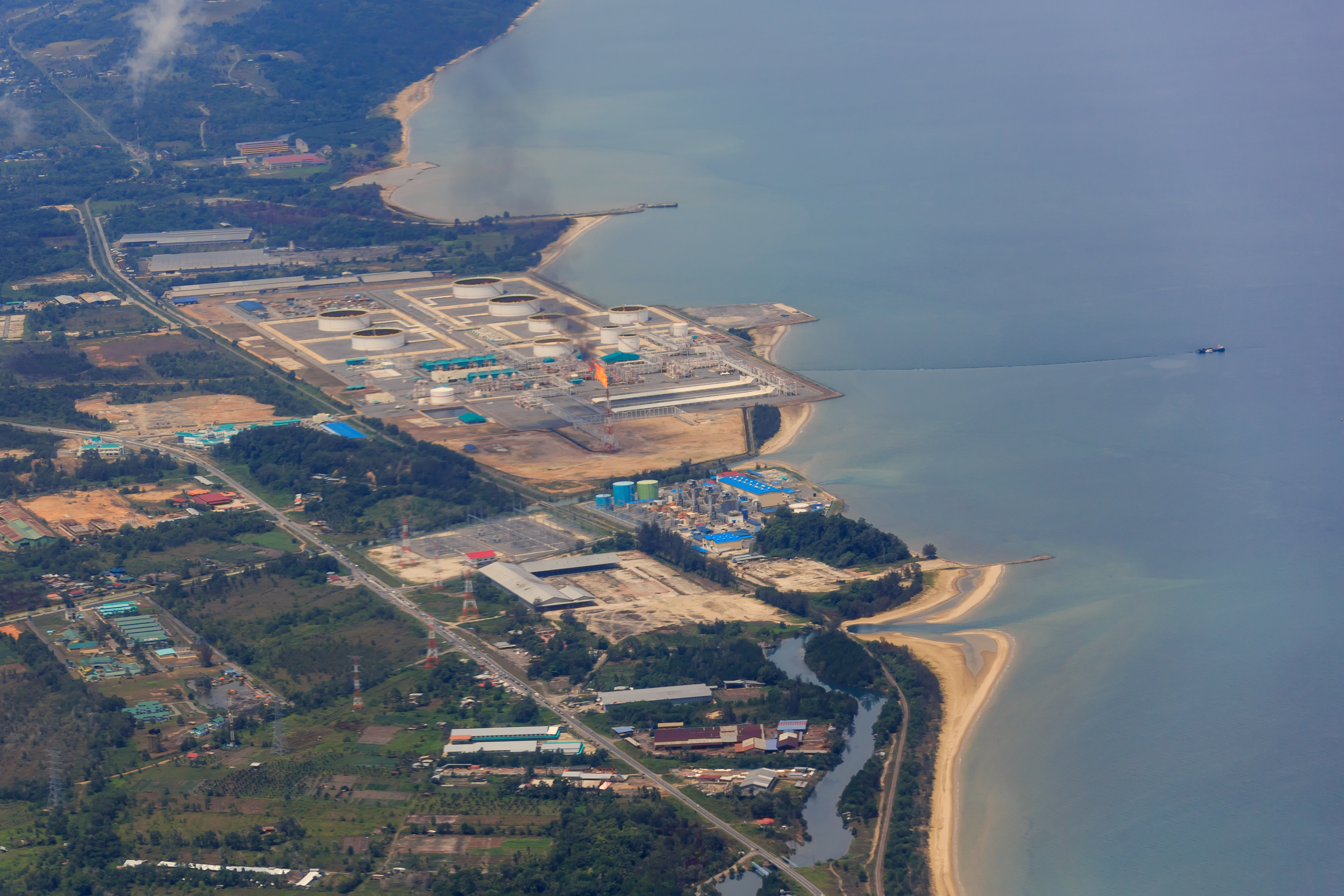
Aerial View of the Sabah Oil and Gas Terminal (SOGT) at Kimanis Bay.

The Sabah Oil and Gas Terminal (SOGT), located in the coastal area of Kimanis Bay, serve as a receiving, storage and export station for oil and natural gas from Sabah's offshore fields. At the same time, the Sabah-Sarawak Gas Pipeline (SSGP) begins here, which transports natural gas over a distance of 522 kilometers to Bintulu, Sarawak.
