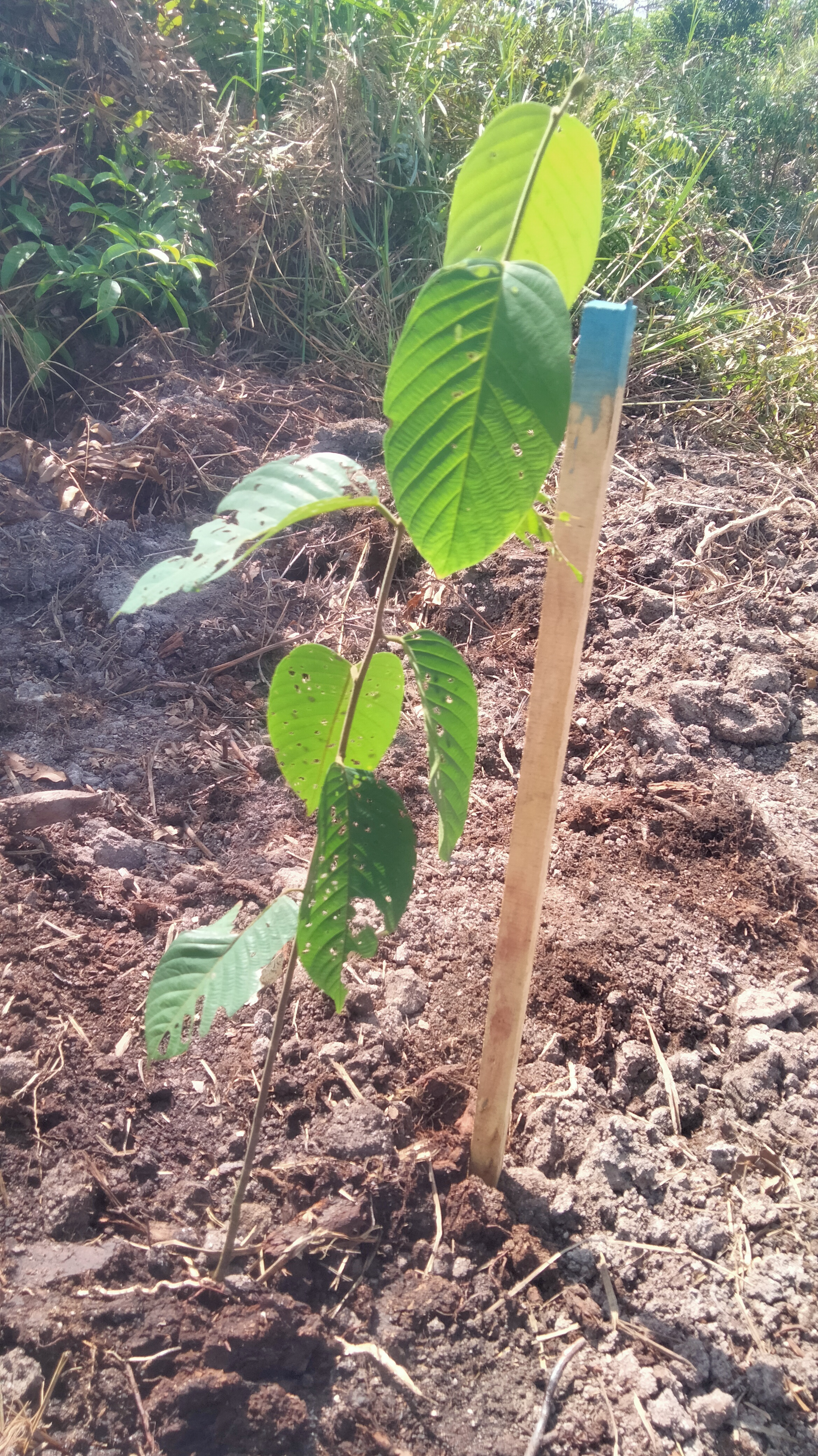
- A sapling of Rubroshorea platycarpa in Pekan Forest Reserve, Malaysia

Conservation status
- Endangered (IUCN 3.1)

Scientific classification
- Kingdom: Plantae
- Clade: Tracheophytes
- Clade: Angiosperms
- Clade: Eudicots
- Clade: Rosids
- Order: Malvales
- Family: Dipterocarpaceae
- Genus: Rubroshorea
- Species: R. platycarpa

Binomial name
- Rubroshorea platycarpa (F.Heim) P.S.Ashton & J.Heck.

Synonyms
- Shorea platycarpa F.Heim (1891) (basionym); Shorea palustris Ridl.

= Rubroshorea platycarpa =

Species of flowering plant

Rubroshorea platycarpa (called, along with some other dipterocarp species, light red meranti) is a species of flowering plant in the family Dipterocarpaceae. It is a tree native to Sumatra, Borneo, Peninsular Malaysia, and Singapore, where it grows in peat swamp forests. It is threatened by habitat loss, and the IUCN assesses the species as endangered.
