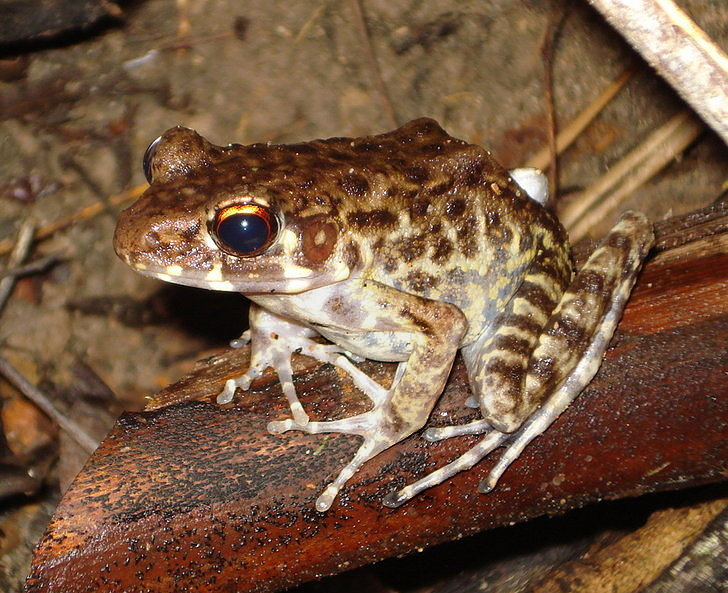
- Hylarana glandulosa from the Thale Ban National Park, Satun Province, Southern Thailand

Conservation status
- Least Concern (IUCN 3.1)

Scientific classification
- Kingdom: Animalia
- Phylum: Chordata
- Class: Amphibia
- Order: Anura
- Family: Ranidae
- Genus: Hylarana
- Species: H. glandulosa

Binomial name
- Hylarana glandulosa (Boulenger, 1882)

Synonyms
- Rana glandulosa Boulenger, 1882; Pulchrana glandulosa (Boulenger, 1882)

= Hylarana glandulosa =

Rough-sided frog

Species of amphibian

Hylarana glandulosa, commonly known as the rough-sided frog or the glandular frog, is a species of true frog in the genus Hylarana. It is native to Brunei Darussalam, Indonesia, Malaysia, Singapore, Thailand, and Vietnam. Its natural habitats are subtropical or tropical moist lowland forest, subtropical or tropical swampland, rivers, freshwater marshes, caves, and plantations. It is not considered threatened by the IUCN.

In Thailand, it is called h̄mā n̂ảm (Thai: หมาน้ำ; literally: water dog) because its call sounds like a barking puppy.

== Gallery of Pulchrana glandulosa ==
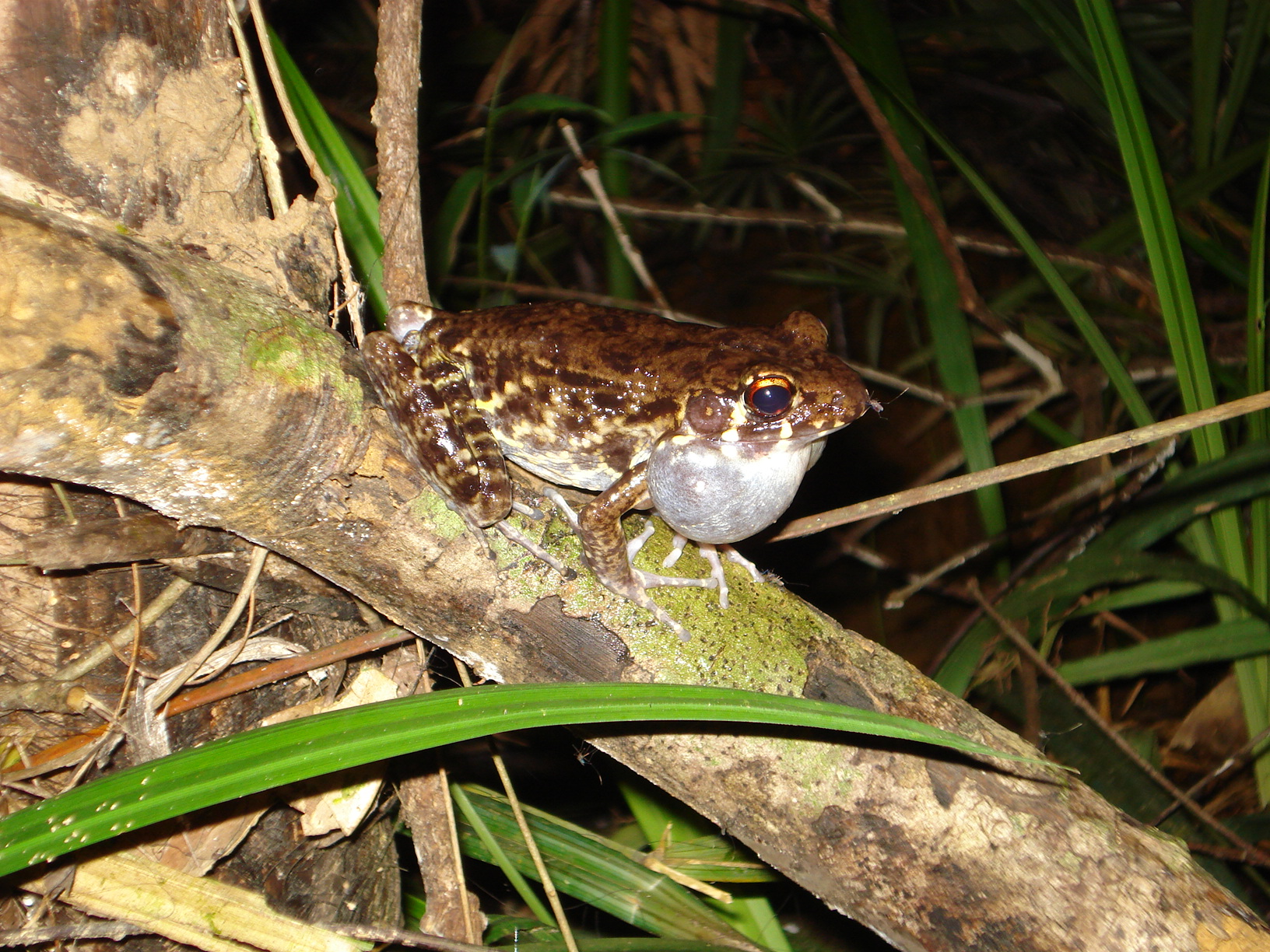
Male Hylarana glandulosa with vocal sac.

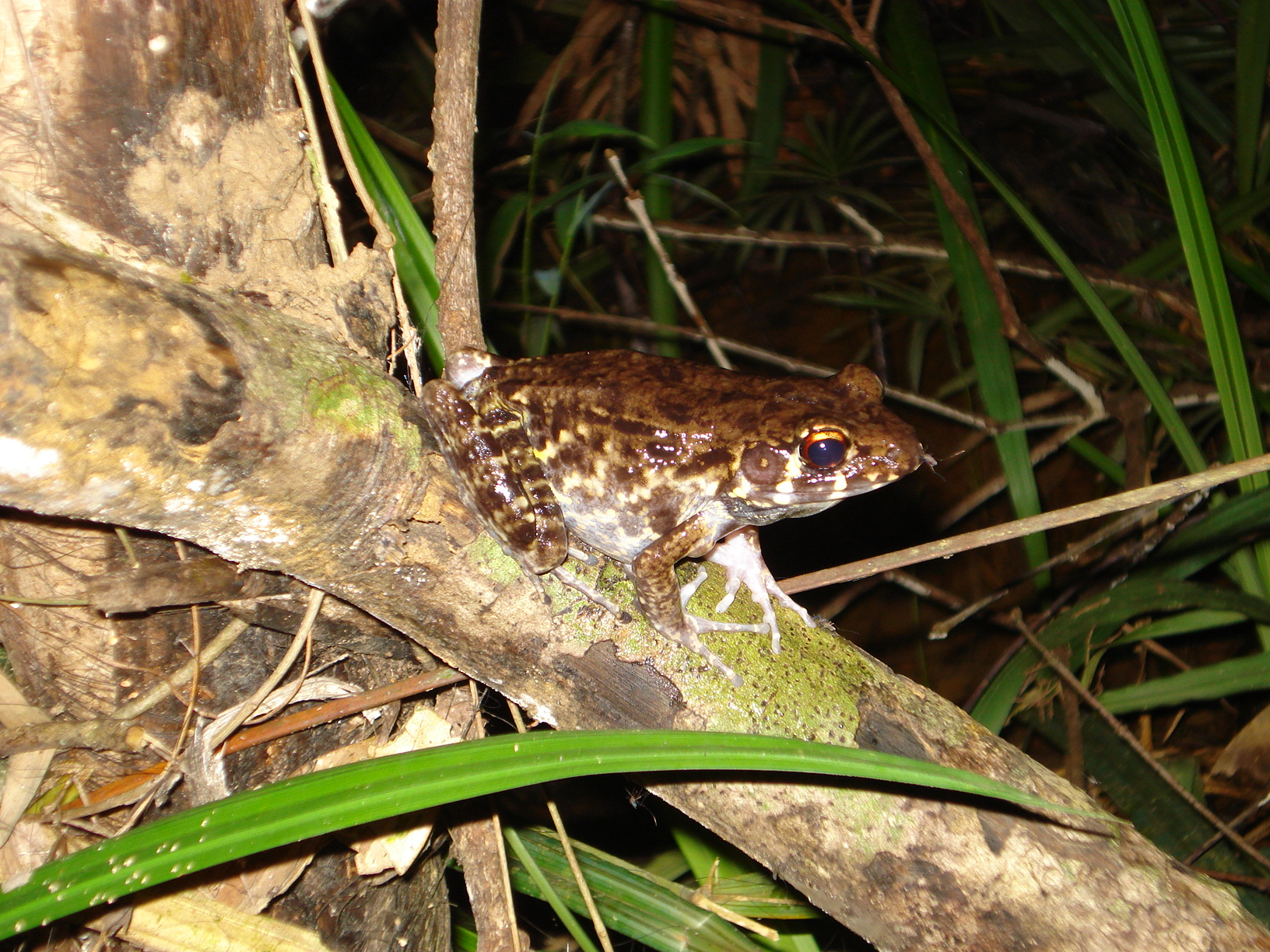
Male Hylarana glandulosa without vocal sac.
