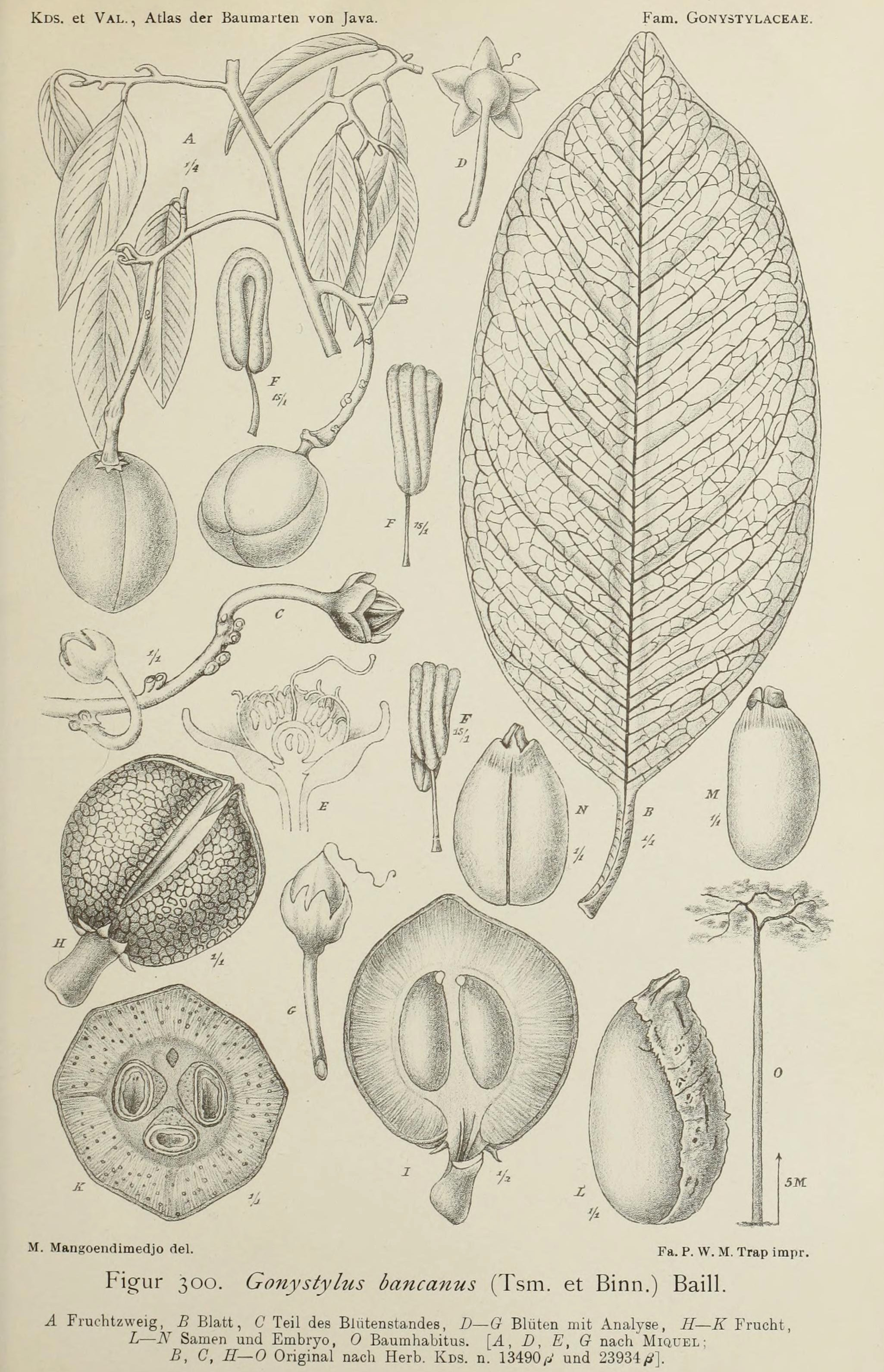

Conservation status
- Critically Endangered (IUCN 3.1)

Scientific classification
- Kingdom: Plantae
- Clade: Tracheophytes
- Clade: Angiosperms
- Clade: Eudicots
- Clade: Rosids
- Order: Malvales
- Family: Thymelaeaceae
- Genus: Gonystylus
- Species: G. bancanus

Binomial name
- Gonystylus bancanus (Miq.) Kurz

Synonyms
- Aquilaria bancana Miq.; Gonystylus hackenbergii Diels

= Gonystylus bancanus =

Species of ramin tree

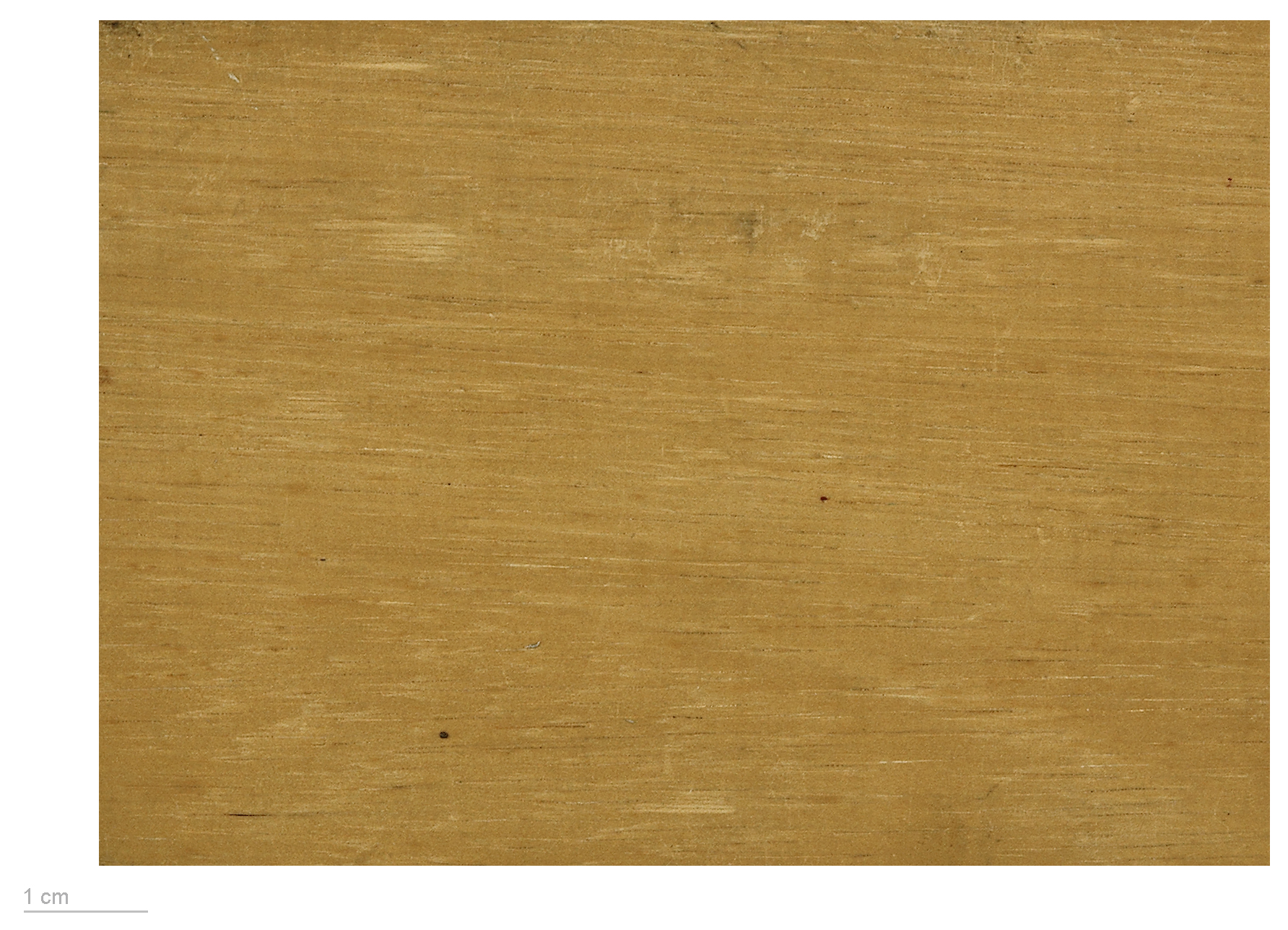
Gonystylus spp. - MHNT

Gonystylus bancanus is a species of tree in the family Thymelaeaceae, growing to over 40 metres (130 ft) tall.

== Distribution and habitat ==
Gonystylus bancanus is native to Borneo, Sumatra, Peninsular Malaysia and Singapore. Its habitat is in lowland swamp forest.

== Conservation ==
Gonystylus bancanus has been assessed as Critically Endangered on the IUCN Red List. Past excessive timber extraction has left populations reduced. The species is also threatened by habitat loss from the development of palm oil plantations.
