= Kuala Penyu =

Kuala Penyu Pekan Kuala Penyu
- Town and district capital
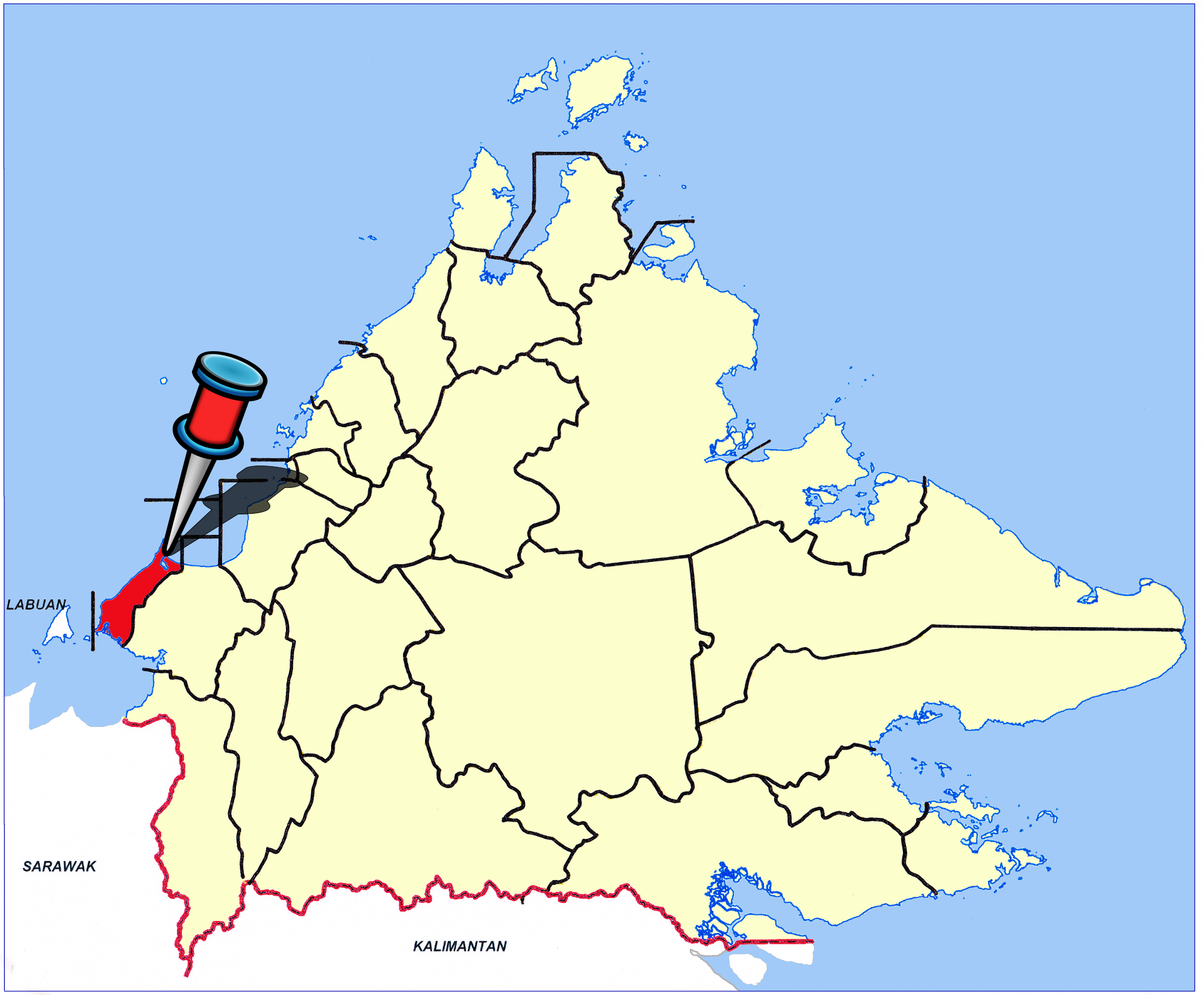
- Coordinates: 5°34′12.72″N 115°35′38.39″E
- Country: Malaysia
- State: Sabah
- Division: Interior
- District: Kuala Penyu
- Administration: Kuala Penyu District Council

Population (2010)
  - Total: 659
- Postal code: 897XX
- Area code: 088
- Tamu (Weekly Local Market): Tuesday
- Website: mdkualapenyu.sabah.gov.my

Kuala Penyu Town (Malay: Pekan Kuala Penyu) is the capital of the Kuala Penyu District in the Interior Division of Sabah, Malaysia. This district can be reached by road or by boat via the sea route. It is only 145 kilometres from Kota Kinabalu via the Beaufort route, and if travelling through Membakut/Pimping, the distance is now just 106 kilometres. Besides saving travel time, visitors taking the Membakut/Pimping route also have the opportunity to use the ferry service to cross Setompok Bay. Its population was estimated to be around 659 in 2010, with ethnic Dusun Tatana sub-group forming the largest single ethnic group.

== History ==
History and Origin of the Name:

- Legend of Batu Penyu:

The name “Kuala Penyu” comes from a cluster of rocks at the mouth of the Sitompok River that resemble the shape of a turtle, or penyu in Malay.

- Sitompok:

In the early 1960s, this area was more commonly known as “Sitompok”, referring to those distinctive rock formations.

== Geography ==
Kuala Penyu is located on the Klias Peninsula, which was once originally covered with mangrove swamp forests. Much of these mangrove swamps were destroyed by land developers that later realised that the soils were much too acidic to support palm oil.

== Climate ==
Kuala Penyu has a tropical rainforest climate (Af) with heavy to very heavy rainfall year-round.

Climate data for Kuala Penyu
Month	Jan	Feb	Mar	Apr	May	Jun	Jul	Aug	Sep	Oct	Nov	Dec	Year
Mean daily maximum °C (°F)	29.9 (85.8)	29.9 (85.8)	30.8 (87.4)	31.5 (88.7)	31.6 (88.9)	31.4 (88.5)	31.0 (87.8)	31.0 (87.8)	30.8 (87.4)	30.6 (87.1)	30.4 (86.7)	30.2 (86.4)	30.8 (87.4)
Daily mean °C (°F)	26.8 (80.2)	26.8 (80.2)	27.5 (81.5)	28.0 (82.4)	28.1 (82.6)	28.0 (82.4)	27.5 (81.5)	27.6 (81.7)	27.4 (81.3)	27.3 (81.1)	27.2 (81.0)	27.1 (80.8)	27.4 (81.4)
Mean daily minimum °C (°F)	23.7 (74.7)	23.8 (74.8)	24.2 (75.6)	24.6 (76.3)	24.7 (76.5)	24.6 (76.3)	24.1 (75.4)	24.2 (75.6)	24.0 (75.2)	24.0 (75.2)	24.0 (75.2)	24.0 (75.2)	24.2 (75.5)
Average rainfall mm (inches)	205 (8.1)	92 (3.6)	122 (4.8)	160 (6.3)	286 (11.3)	294 (11.6)	240 (9.4)	267 (10.5)	334 (13.1)	369 (14.5)	383 (15.1)	269 (10.6)	3,021 (118.9)
Source: Climate-Data.org

== Demographics ==
According to general unrecorded consensus, most Kuala Penyuan are farmers with some younger generations are migrating to towns. It is widely diversified with unrecorded consensus has it that majority are embracing or practising Christianity or Islam, while some are still sticking to animism. As a part of clarification on ethnic group in Kuala Penyu, it's fair enough to mention that every one of them specifically by percentage base on previous official record through consensus report year 2010 was stated 659 peoples, where the most races as follow; ethnic Dusun people of the Dusun Tatana and Bisaya sub-groups, Bruneian Malay, Kedayan, Bajau, Chinese, Indian and others.

== Gallery ==
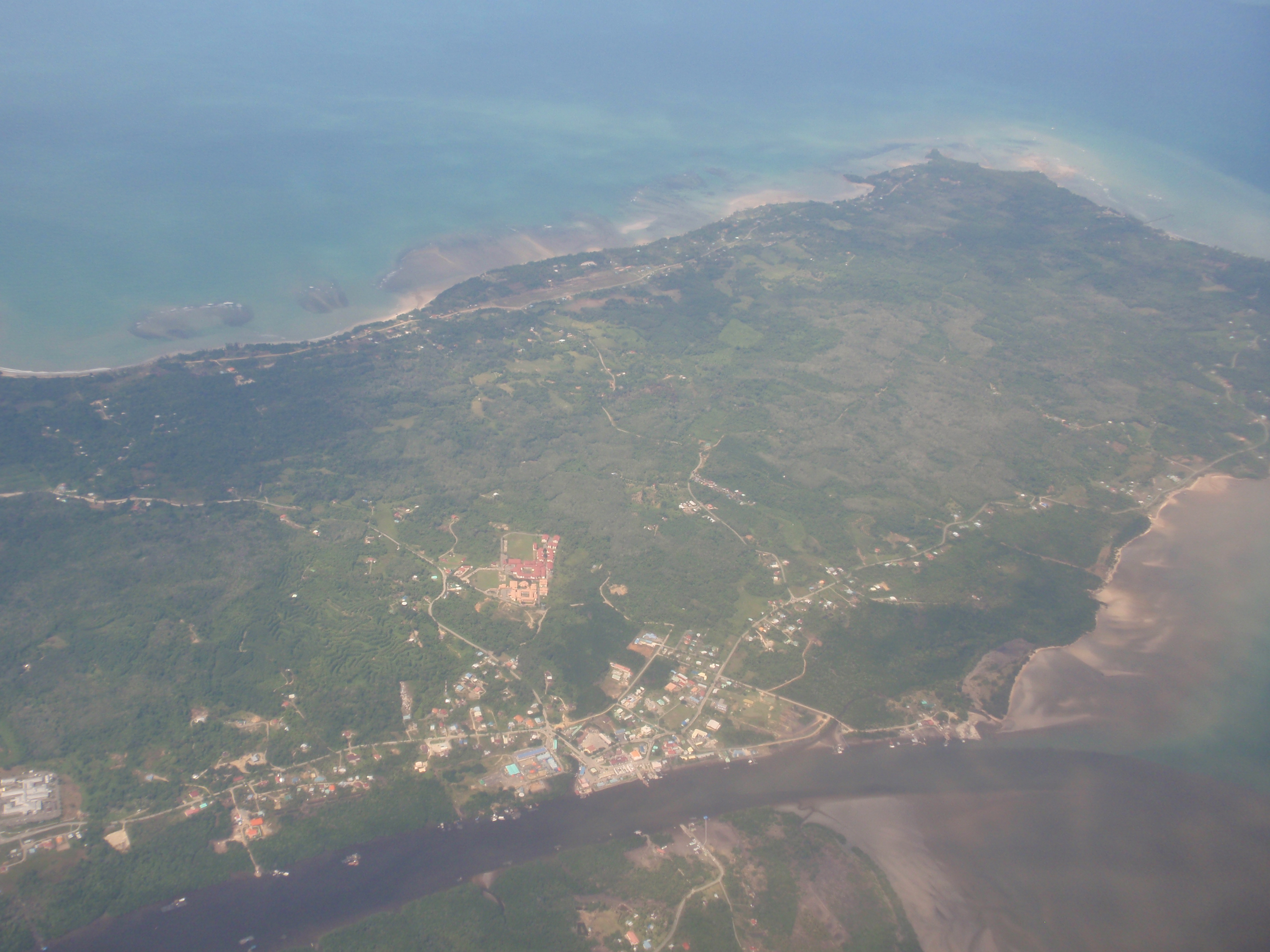
A geographic view of Kuala Penyu.

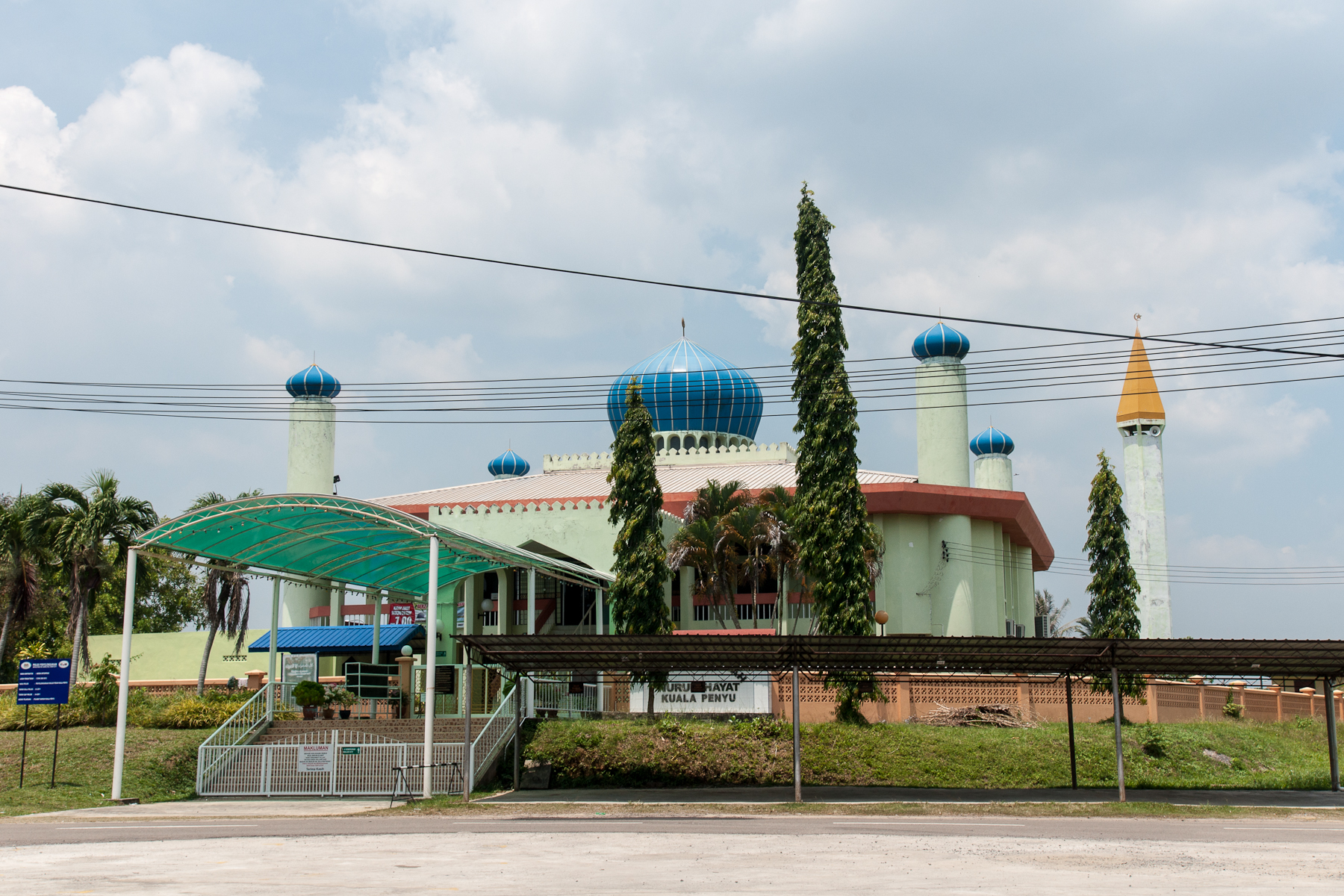
A mosque in Kuala Penyu.

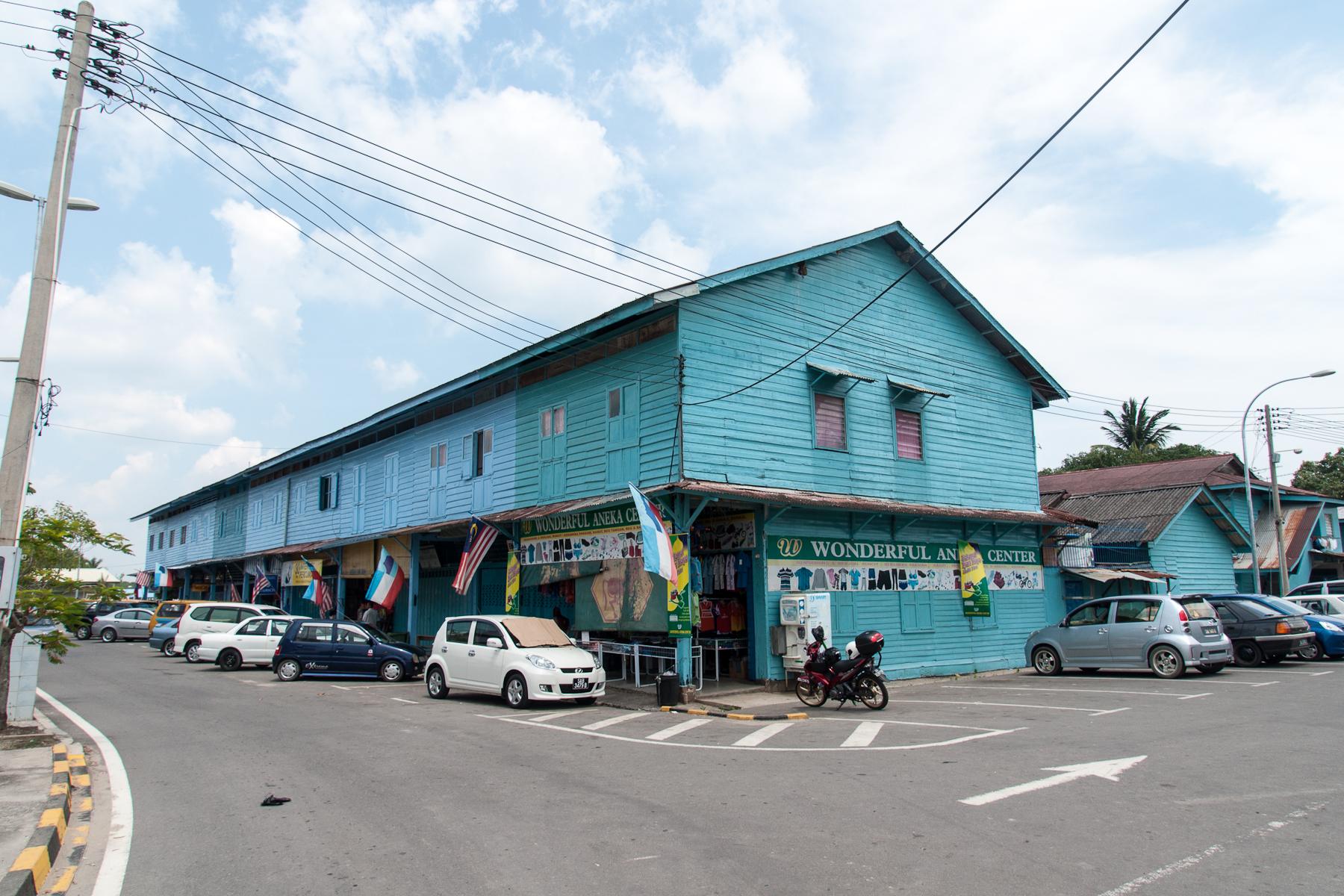
Old shoplots in Kuala Penyu.

== See also ==
- Sitompok Bridge
