= Bisaya (Borneo) =

Indigenous ethnic group of Borneo

Bisaya people Orang Bisaya
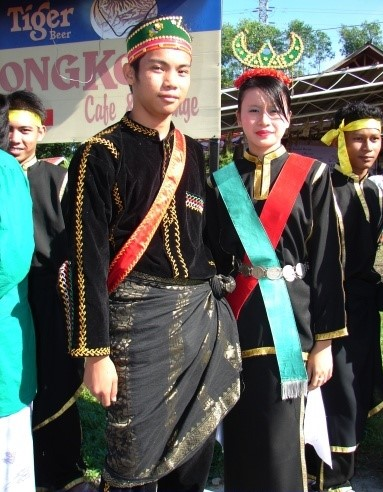
- Sabah Bisaya of Beaufort District in their traditional attire

Total population
- c. 145,000

Regions with significant populations
- Brunei: 42,000 (2026) (Belait, Temburong, and Tutong districts) Malaysia; Sabah: 81,000 (2026) (Beaufort, Kuala Penyu, and Sipitang districts); Sarawak: 7,000 (1984) (Lawas and Limbang districts); Labuan United States: 15,000 (2026) (around Texas)

Languages
- Sabah Bisaya, Brunei Bisaya, Sabah Malay, Sarawak Malay, Brunei Malay, Standard Malay, English

Religion
- Islam (Sunni) (Brunei, Sabah, and Labuan); Christianity (Roman Catholic and Protestant) and animism (Sarawak)

Related ethnic groups
- Dusunic related peoples; (Kadazan; Dusun; Kwijau; Paitan; Tatana, Lotud; Brunei Dusun; Rungus; Kadazan-Dusun); Dayak • Iban • Melanau • Lun Bawang/Dayeh • Murut • Kedayan • other Austronesian peoples

The Bisaya people, or simply the Bisayas, are an Austronesian ethnic group indigenous to East Malaysia and Brunei. Their populations are concentrated within Sabah's Interior Division, specifically on Klias Peninsula; along the Padas and Klias riverbanks, down to the coastal estuary within the districts of Beaufort, Kuala Penyu, and Sipitang in the southwestern area; (Note: In Sabah, the Bisaya are included under the Kadazan-Dusun group of peoples.) the Federal Territory of Labuan; and in the Lawas and Limbang districts of Sarawak. (Note: In Sarawak, the Bisaya are grouped under the Orang Ulu designation.) The Bisaya tribe bears many similarities to the Tatana Dusun tribe, especially in terms of language, as there is a high degree of mutual intelligibility between the two groups. (Note: Based on historical folklore legend, the origin of the name of the Tatana Dusun ethnic group stems from an event during a war between the Tatana Dusun tribe and the Bisaya tribe. The ancestors of the Tatana tribe were once attacked by the Bisaya tribe, who migrated to the Padas and Klias river area around the 1500s. After a series of battles, peace was established between the two tribes, leading to close relations, with further intermarriage and cultural assimilation.) In Brunei, they are referred to as both Dusun and Bisaya while being included in the official Malay ethnic designation within the country's official national census, where they are located in the Belait, Temburong, and Tutong districts. (Note: In Brunei, the Bisaya are part of the official broader definition of Malay groups in the country.)

Formerly animist-pagan and influenced by Buddhist-Hindu local governments, with strong spiritualist beliefs, the Bisaya form an important agricultural and fishing community within the northwestern coast of Borneo, with close connections to the Sultanate of Brunei.

The Bisaya people in Brunei, Sarawak, and Sabah share linguistic and cultural roots but differ in their religious practices and specific regional identities. Sabah Bisaya are mostly Muslim, concentrated along the southwestern coasts, including in Labuan; Sarawak Bisaya are mostly Christian, often found along the Limbang River; and Brunei Bisaya, with either Muslim or non-Muslim populations, are frequently classified as Dusun or Jati Dusun.

== Etymology ==
The Sabah Bisaya during a joint celebration of Kaamatan

There are several theories regarding the origin of the name "Bisaya". It refers to an ethnic group who settled in northern Sarawak and Sabah (the former North Borneo) and also to the Ilonggo Bisaya of the Philippines. Based on a Bornean Bisaya legend recorded by the British colonial administrator and resident of North Borneo Derek Headly in 1950, when the sultan of Brunei reached the region of the Bisaya in west northern Borneo, he exclaimed "Bisai-yah!", which is a Brunei Malay word meaning "how beautiful!" Another theory holds that the term comes from the word Ma Bisa, meaning "ability" or "greatness", associated with the medical knowledge and traditional practices of this tribe.

The American anthropologist H. Otley Beyer in 1926, E. D. Hester of the University of Chicago Philippine Studies Program in 1954, and the Argentine-born British polymath Tom Harrisson in 1956, suggested that the name may have come from the Sumatran empire of Srivijaya. However, in 1960, Eugene Vestraelen, professor of linguistics at the University of San Carlos, Cebu City, cautioned that the linguistic derivation of Vijaya would not be Bisaya but Bidaya, or Biraya. Another theory was suggested by the American author John Carroll:

The term Visaya might be the Sanskrit Vaishya, denoting the 3rd caste of the Hindu caste system. The Philippines Bisaya were first referred to by the general term Pintados (the painted ones) by the Spanish colonial authorities, in reference to the prominent practice of full-body tattooing (batok). The word Bisaya, on the other hand, was first documented in Spanish sources in reference to the non-Ati inhabitants of the island of Panay.

— John Carroll, through a publication on the Philippine Studies regarding the Philippines Bisaya, 1961

Through his early writings on the Notes on the Bisaya in the Philippines and Borneo in 1959, Carroll detailed a significant difference between the Bisaya of the Philippines and those of North Borneo, Brunei, and Sarawak, especially in their languages. In Brunei, the Bisaya are referred to as Dusun, Jati Dusun, and Bisaya. The term Bisaya is also used within the country, although more commonly for those who settled in the border areas of Limbang and Sarawak, who have very close family ties with the Limbang Bisaya.

== Background history and origin ==
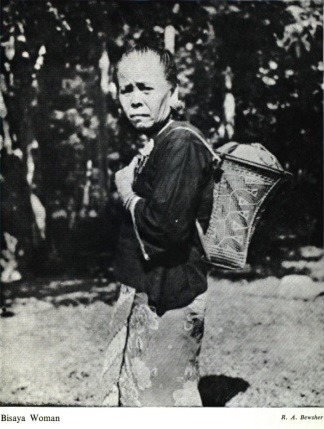
Bisaya woman photographed by R. A. Bewsher on 31 December 1958

Several theories have been put forward by various researchers regarding the origins of the Bisaya people of Borneo, with some research also associating the group with another ethnic group with a closely similar name in the neighbouring Philippines. The English-born anthropologist and museum curator Henry Ling Roth, through his publication The Natives of Sarawak and British North Borneo in 1896, describes the Bisaya as originating from the Philippine islands, where they were found within the lower waters of the Padas and Klias rivers of North Borneo, with the majority being Muslim, while in Limbang of Sarawak, most were non-Muslim. They were described by the British as a peaceful ethnic group fond of gambling, with their main occupations consisting of raising livestock, with rice and sago plantations where they migrated to Labuan in great numbers throughout the British administrations.

The English historian, novelist, and travel writer Owen Rutter further opined that the Bisaya of Borneo are probable offshoots of the Visayans of the Philippines. Several additional studies have presented theories suggesting that the Bornean Bisaya share a common ancestry with the Visayan Filipinos, attributing this connection to the migration of Bornean Bisaya chiefs to the island of Panay in the Philippines, which is also linked to the "10 Datus of Borneo" legends of the Maragtas in that country. This claim was further supported through the Tarsilah Brunei, a history and genealogy of the sultanate of Brunei, in which many of the Visayas inhabitants are close relatives of the Bisaya in northern Borneo, with their names being closely connected, and the island name itself being believed to be named as a remembrance to their ancestors in Po Ni (Brunei/Borneo). The Bornean Bisaya are closely associated with Bruneian royalty, since the first sultan, Muhammad Shah, known by his former name of Lok Batata, had Bisaya roots. It was during his reign and subsequent conversion that Brunei was transformed from a Hindu-Buddhist kingdom into a Muslim state. (Note: Based on The Pagan Tribes of Borneo (1912), written by the British colonial administrator Charles Hose and the psychologist William McDougall, Muhammad Shah is said to have gone to Johore, where he converted to Islam to marry the daughter of a sultan, and he received the title of Sultan Muhammad Shah to expand his rule over Sarawak and his other conquests, although the exact circumstances of how his conversion happened are still a matter of debate. Since his reign, the royal house of Brunei has largely derived from three sources—Arab people, the Bisaya, and Chinese people. Following their conversion to Islam en masse through their contacts with the Mohammedan Malays, the Bisaya, together with the Kedayan, adopted Malay dress and, to some extent, Malay customs as part of their culture.)

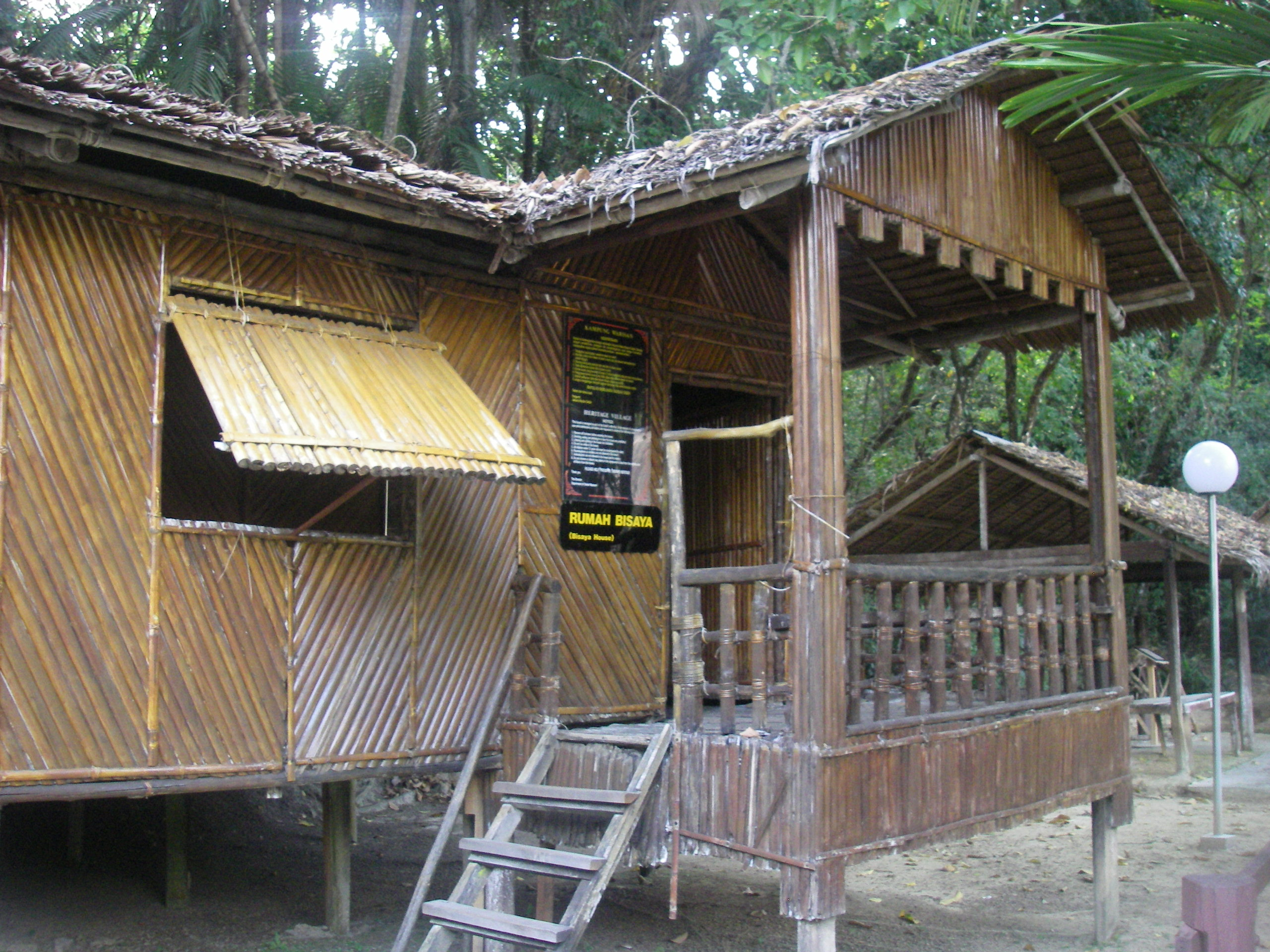
Restored traditional Bisaya house in the Heritage Village of Kota Kinabalu District, Sabah, Malaysia

There is a popular legend among the Bisaya, the Tatanak, which considers Lok Batata and his six siblings to be descendants of the Bisaya ethnic group in Borneo. The Bisaya, along with their language, are considered to be indigenous and Bumiputera to Brunei, locally referred to as puak jati. The Bisaya, together with the Belait, Brunei Dusun, and Murut, were mainly non-Muslim at the time. They were further closely connected with other indigenous ethnicities within the western coast of northern Borneo, such as the Bruneian Malays, Kedayan, and the Dusun people (including the Kadazan), where they are further grouped as part of the broader Kadazan-Dusun grouping in Sabah, under the broader Orang Ulu designation in Sarawak, and part of the official broader Malay groups within Brunei; they are also a Bumiputera within Malaysia. During British rule, the Bisaya of Sarawak were classified under the Klemantan ethnic designation, where they are further grouped under the Baram ethnic subgroup. Bisaya children in North Borneo were also enrolled in schools, and some Bisaya adults were employed in the British North Borneo Constabulary.

In 1970, an estimated 14,000 Bisaya lived in Sabah and 3,312 in Sarawak. In Brunei, most of the Bisaya live within the Bebuloh and Batang Mitus villages, where they have a strong cultural bond with the Limbang Bisaya of Sarawak, since many of the Brunei Bisaya also come from Sarawak, and the movement of people between the two has been ongoing for generations. Within Sabah, Bisaya can be found from Gadong and Takuli villages in Beaufort District to Kerukan village in Kuala Penyu District. (Note: The Bisaya community is found within the Klias River area and along the banks of the Padas River within Beaufort District. In Klias, they inhabit villages such as Kabidang, Kebatu, Kota Klias, Klias Kecil, Kukut, Laba, Malabau, Nukahan, and Takuli; along the Padas River, within the areas of Bangkalalak, Batandok, Beringin, Gadong, Garama, Jabang, Kebajang, Kepawa, Lawa, Lago, Limbawang, Luagan, Lubak, Lupak, Malalugus, Mempagar, Padas Damit, Pintas, Silaun, and Suasa; while in Kuala Penyu District, their settlements are within Kilugus, Malikaidan, Manggis, Pecan Menumbok, Sinapokan, and Siaun villages.) A number of them are also in Sipitang District, within Sindumin, Mesapol, and the main town area as well as in the neighbouring Federal Territory of Labuan and major Sabah cities and towns along the western coast. Most historical relics and stories about the Bisaya trace their roots to the community in Beaufort, considered to be the oldest Bisaya group.

== Culture and society ==
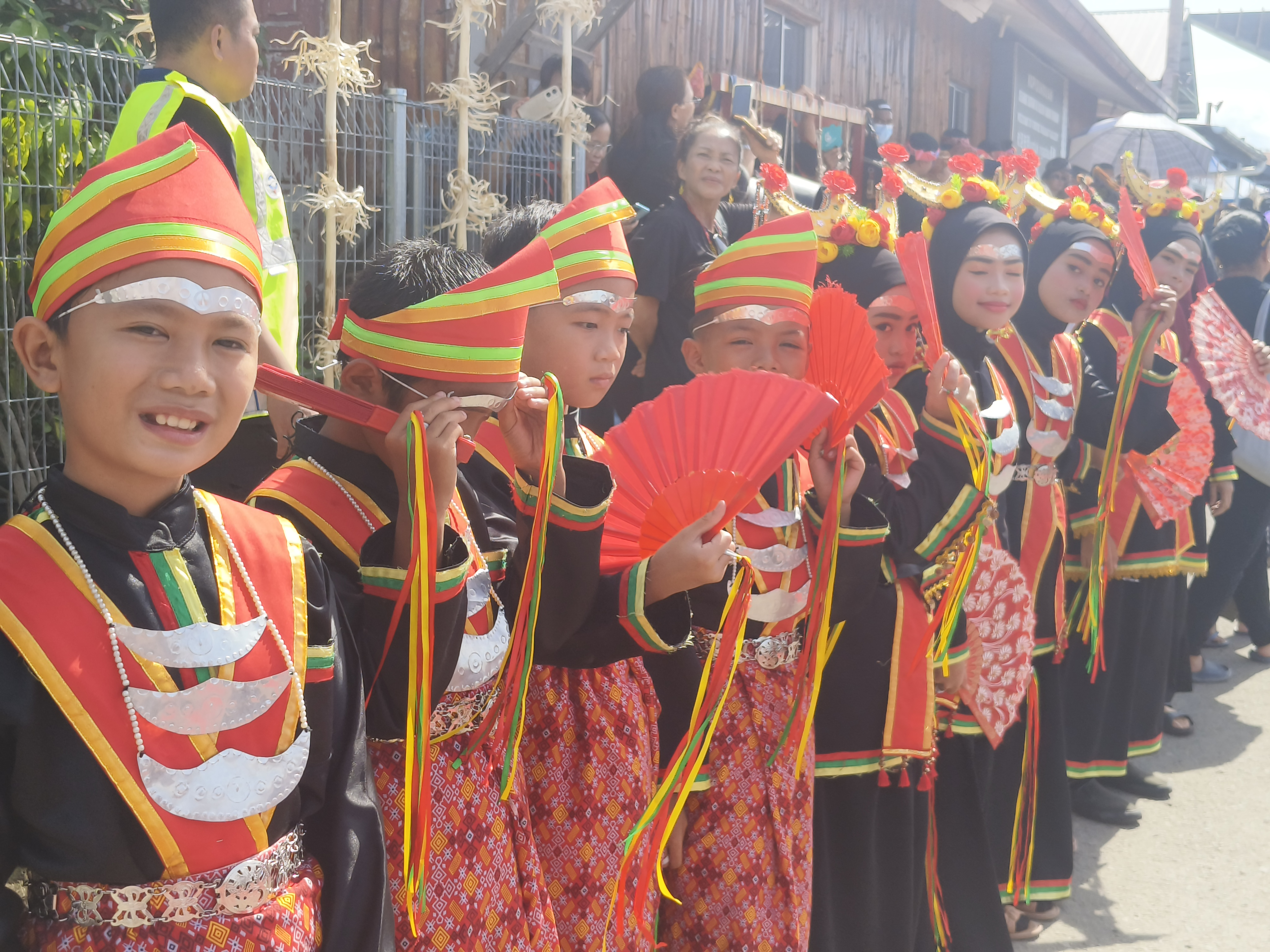
Bisaya children in traditional attire during a cultural event at the Kadazan Dusun Cultural Association

The Bisaya people are known for their agricultural expertise in rice, sago, coconut, ginger, maize, and various fruit and vegetables cultivation, sharing close ties with the Bruneian Malays and both the Kedayan and Tatana Dusun, while being distinct from the Philippine Visayans due to different geographies and centuries of different colonial influences. Since Bisaya geographical settlements are mostly located on riverbanks and in coastal areas, they rely on farming and trade for sustenance. They engage in fishing, hunting, animal husbandry, handicraft production, and other small-scale business activities, with all of their agricultural, livestock, and forest products being brought to the market. Two Bisaya cultural centres, located in both Sabah and Sarawak, represent their respective regions: the Bisaya Cultural and Arts Centre in Beaufort District serves as the main centre for Sabah Bisaya, and the Sarawak Bisaya Association Cultural Centre in Batu Danau Limbang village of Limbang District for Sarawak Bisaya. Both centres organise various activities related to the tribes' development and promotion of cultural arts and heritage.

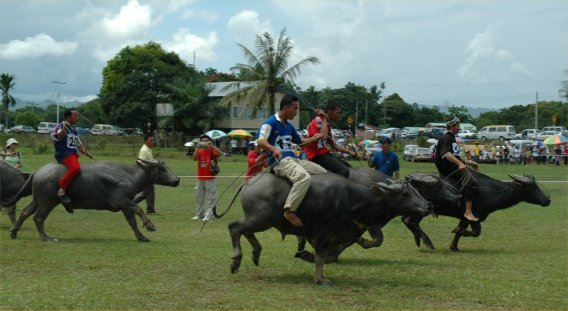
The Sarawak Bisaya annual Babulang festival, featuring water buffalo races

The Sarawak Bisaya celebrate their annual Babulang festival, which includes music, dance, the wearing of traditional costumes, and water buffalo races, while the Sabah Bisaya are known for their Adau Janang Gayuh celebration and the Kulintangan festival. The latter celebration also features a traditional clothing competition, proa racing, tug of war, rowing, traditional kite flying, top spinning, a gendang competition along with other traditional musical instruments, as well as traditional Bisaya foods, such as ambuyat. A state-level Bisaya festival has also been held in Sabah since 2024, to empower the ethnic culture through various competitions involving traditional music and dance. During the Kaamatan celebration in Sabah, kulintangan performances take place at the Hongkod Koisaan hall. The Bisaya of the Kuala Penyu District of Sabah celebrate the Pesta Rumbia (sago palm) festival. In Sarawak, the use of digital platforms has been promoted to showcase various Bisaya cultural events in order to preserve the group's heritage in the face of challenges brought about by modernisation.

=== Music and dance ===
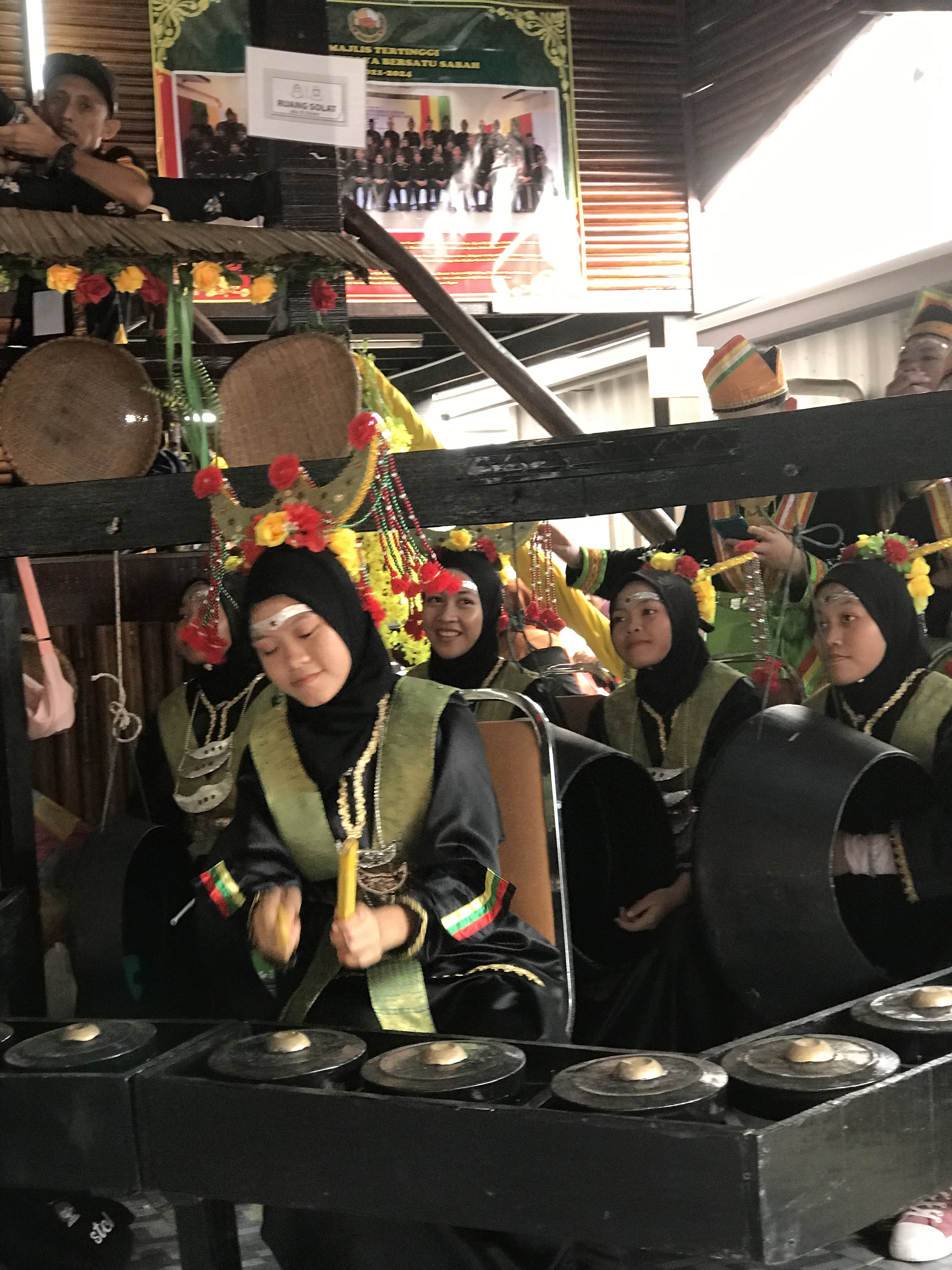
Kulintangan performance

Bisaya culture includes several traditional dances, such as Alai Bubu, Lilibu, as well as the children's dances Anak Kuda (Note: Once part of Berasik, a ritual dance of the Bisaya.) and Liliput/Tumutu.

Popular among the Bisayas in Beaufort and Lawas as well as in Limbang, the Alai Bubu (also known by other names, such as Bubu Mengalai, Main Lukah, or Sayau Salahid), dance originates from a myth about a "dancing" fish trap. Since prohibitions were introduced by the Sabah Islamic Religious Affairs Department in the 1970s, elements of spirituality and black magic inherent in the dances have been abandoned. Despite a revival in the 1980s, spiritual chants have been completely omitted from the practice, with only a few elderly Bisaya still remembering them.

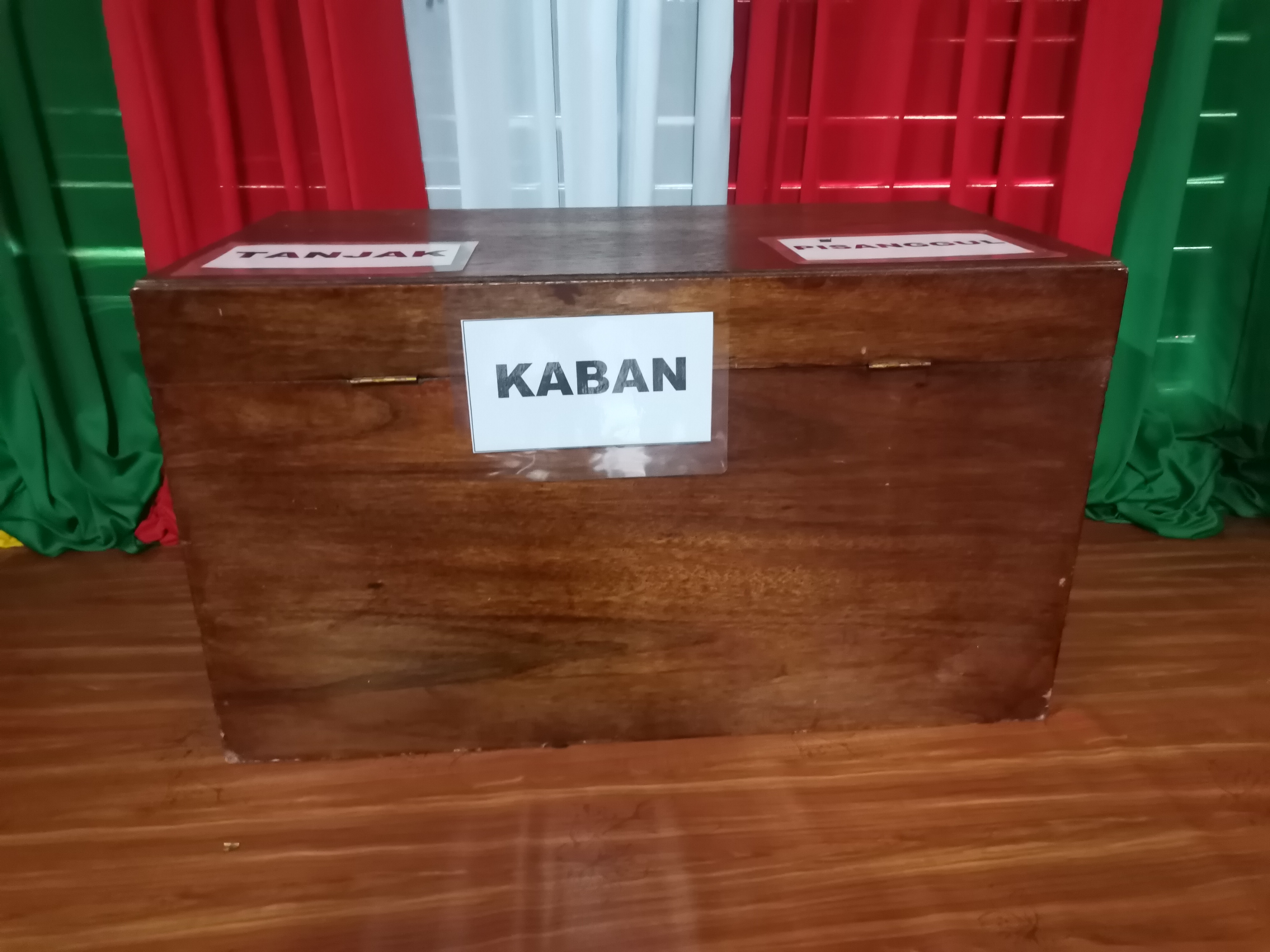
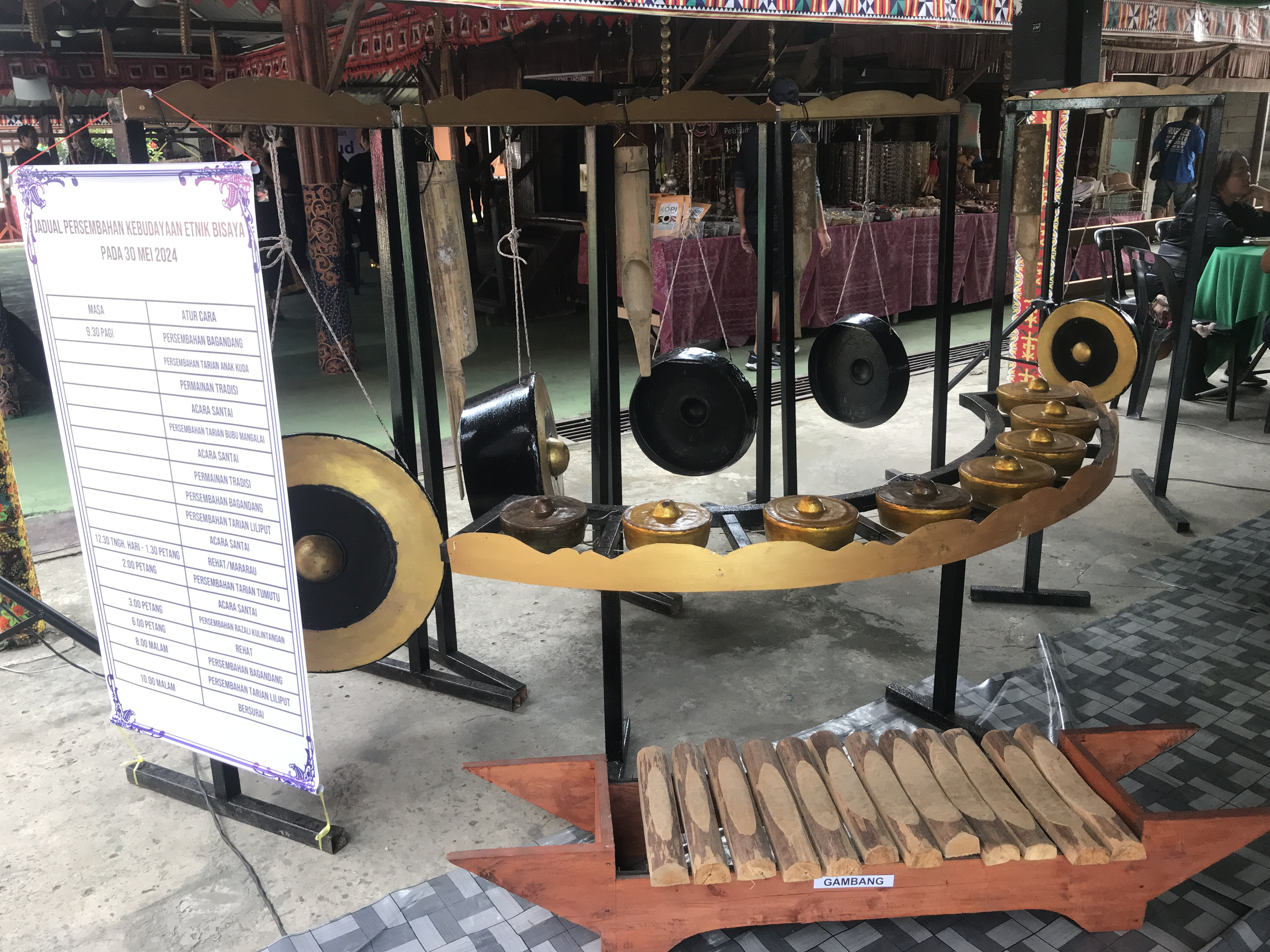
From left to right: Kaban, a box for storing items, also used as a seat during musical performances
Some Bisaya traditional musical instruments: the gong, the kulintangan (gong-chime), and the gambang (wood xylophone)

Lilibu is a traditional dance of the agricultural Sabah Bisaya community in Beaufort, centred around the rice harvest and accompanied by singing as an expression of gratitude, which, prior to Islamisation, was performed to appease the spirit of rice. Another dance, the Berasik is a type of traditional healing to expel disturbances believed to be the source of illness or affliction in individuals caused by spirits. Traditional Bisaya musical instruments, particularly in Sabah and Sarawak, are characterised by gong-based ensembles and bamboo percussion closely linked to communal celebrations. The main instruments include the kulintangan (gong-chime), various brass gongs, gambang (wood xylophone), and gendang (drums).

=== Attire ===
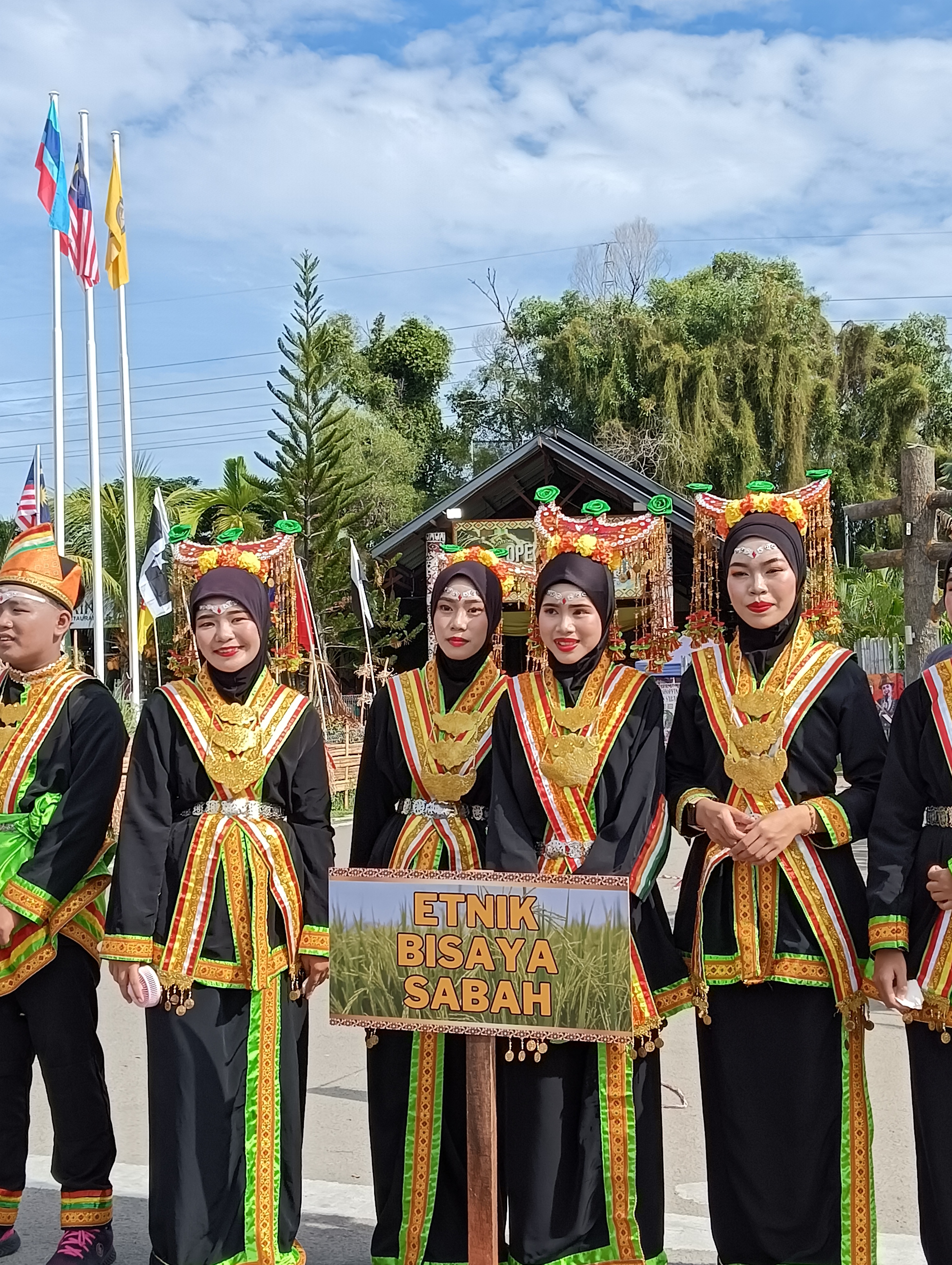
Sabah Bisaya women in traditional ethnic attire combined with the Muslim tudong headscarf

Traditional Bornean Bisaya attire from both Sabah and Sarawak is known for its black colour, similar to that of the Kadazan, Dusun, Murut, and Rungus as well as the Kedayan of Labuan and the Belait of Brunei. This is combined with a red, green, or yellow sash. These outfits are often highlighted with bold, intricate stitching and silver/gold embroidery and traditional silver buttons. Among the Bisaya of Beaufort, females wear the timbuku ("bun") headdress, while males wear the sigar, which is similar to the tengkolok headgear. Among the Lawas and Limbang of Sarawak, the mianai is a common outfit for males, while females wear the masuk and kebamban. Both are commonly worn during traditional ceremonies, celebrations, thanksgiving rituals, weddings, and various social events, especially during festive occasions such as the Adau Janang Gayuh festival. In Brunei, the kebamban limo is a traditional outfit, specifically for bridegrooms. In the past, Bisaya clothing was made from ordinary cloth, but since their introduction, higher-quality resources that last longer have been used. Modern Bisaya attire has evolved to include shorter, contemporary sarongs made of songket adorned with gold thread, as well as beaded headscarves and other accessories, although traditional elements continue to be preserved to maintain the authenticity of their original designs.

=== Handicrafts ===
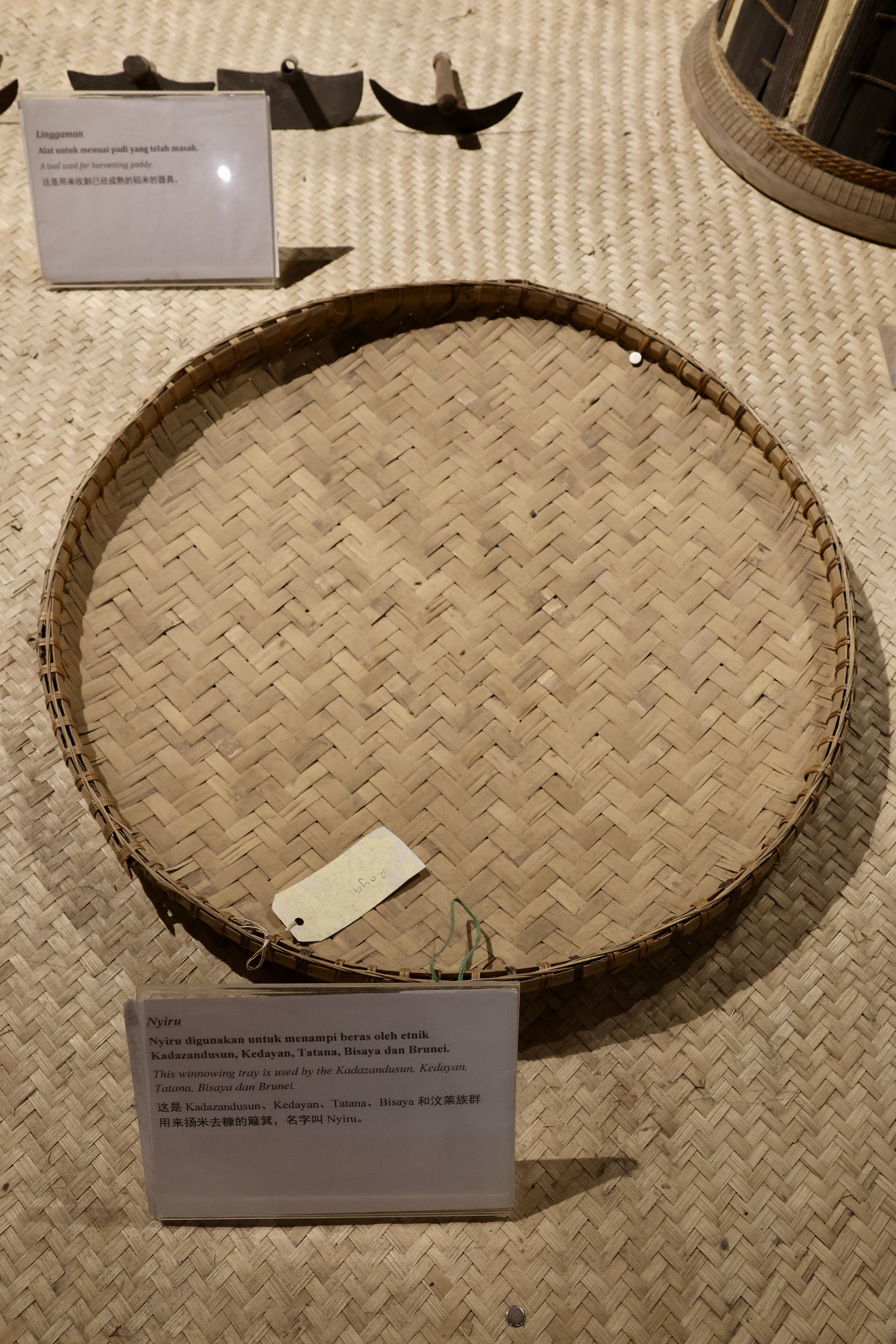
The nyiru (winnowing tray), commonly used by the Kadazan, Dusun, Kedayan, Bisaya, and Bruneian Malays, exhibited at the Sabah Museum

The Bisaya are known for their handicraft and weaving skills, using various natural resources gathered from the forests of their native regions, such as bamboo, rattan, sago palm, wood, animal skins, and Pandanus tectorius (pandan). This includes the kalambigas, (Note: A different item with a similar name, the kalambigas also existed among the Visayas of the Philippines, particularly in the Western Visayas, as an armlet, although there is no indication of whether it was worn by men or women.) a tool placed on the neck of a water buffalo to pull the rumbia (Metroxylon sagu) during agricultural activities. Another is lasok, a basket used to carry crop yields and other necessities, and the salihid, made from bamboo and used to catch fish. Takiding, a traditional woven basket of different sizes with shoulder straps, is common among the Bisayas of Brunei, Sabah, and Sarawak, where it is also referred to as saging. It is made from either bamboo, rattan, salingkawang (Dicranopteris linearis), or other natural resources and used to carry or store goods such as fruits, vegetables, and rice.

A nyiru (winnowing basket) is common among indigenous people of central Borneo, including the Bisaya, and traditionally used in agriculture and presently in cultural performances and ceremonies, such as the lilibu dance. Bisaya handicrafts reflect indigenous coastal traditions, often featuring intricate beadwork and woven bamboo as well as aspects of traditional attire, with key items including beaded accessories, handmade mats, and baskets. These traditional crafts can be found in local markets and through specialised cultural showcases. The Bisaya of Sarawak are known for their specialised traditional weaving, with common motifs including flora and fauna. The Bisaya have also been known for their traditional weapons, such as the andiban (spear), parang (large knife), sumpit (blowgun), and kris (dagger).

=== Marriage ===
Bisaya wedding customs in Sabah and Sarawak are known for their unique ancestral elements, such as merisik (surveying), bertunang (engagement), and berinai (henna). The ceremony involves traditional costumes and a procession, with the groom being carried, as well as the pusing naga custom of circling a pillar three times. Merisik is carried out by the male side to investigate the female's background and to ensure that the prospective bride is not already married. It also aims to introduce the groom and the bride's families and to negotiate a dowry. A three-day period is granted to the bride's family to decide whether or not they will accept the groom. The bertunang ceremony takes place when both parties have reached an agreement. Traditionally, up to a year is given to the male side to prepare the engagement. The berinai ceremony involves the application of henna to the bride's nails and fingers, which symbolises her marriage.

=== Cuisine ===
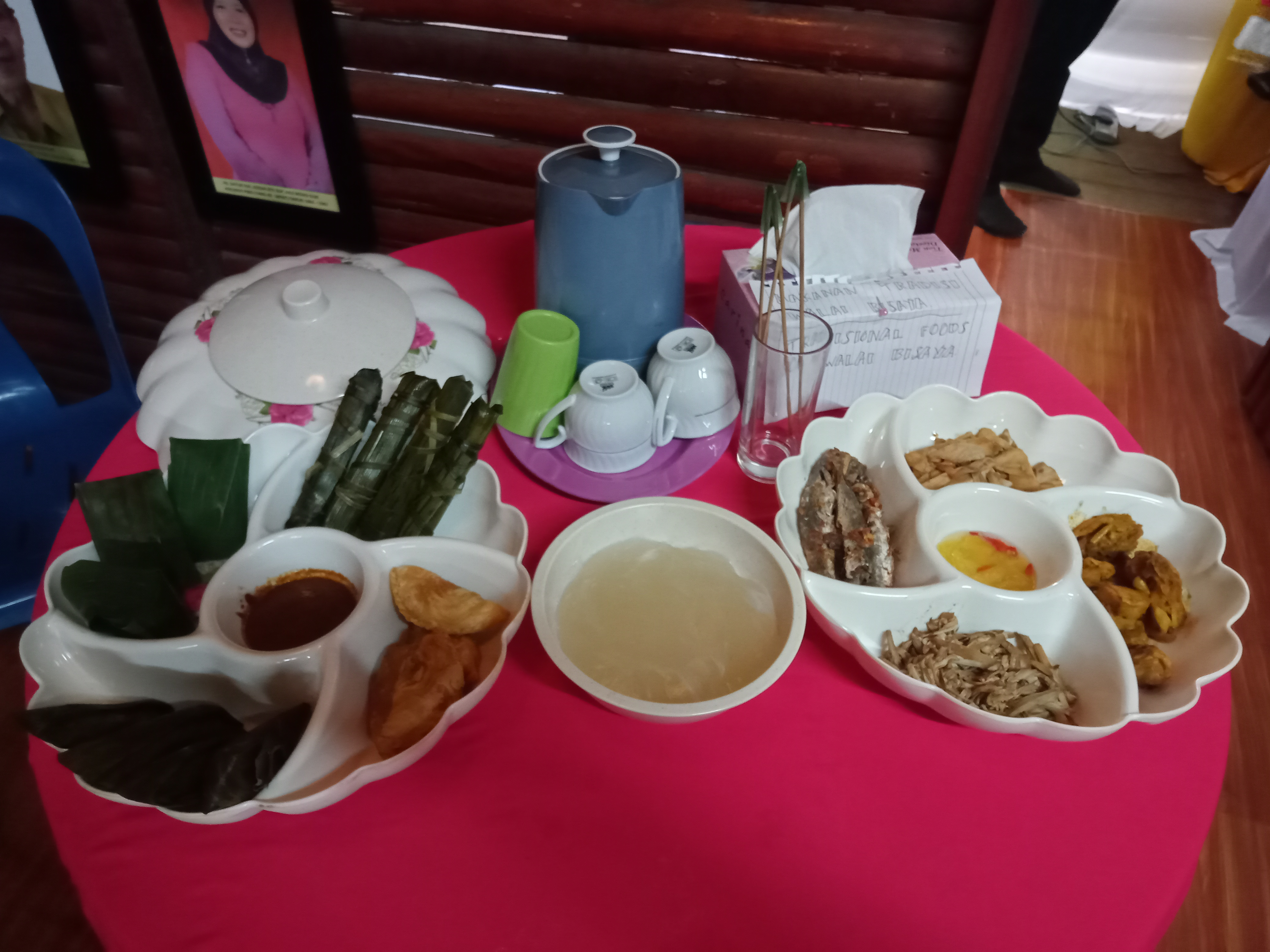
Traditional food and drinks of the Bisaya

Ambuyat is the main traditional dish of both the Bisaya and Bruneian Malays within both Brunei and Malaysia, with its origins in Bisaya culture. Popular especially among the Bisaya in Kuala Penyu District of Sabah, it is made using sago flour obtained by processing the trunk of the rumbia tree (Metroxylon sagu), commonly called among the locals as ampulung, though the dish is also enjoyed by closely related indigenous groups of western coastal Borneo, such as the Tatana Dusun, the Kadazan-Dusun, the Lundayeh, and the Bajaus. Bisaya cuisine is replete with sago-based dishes, including umbut (heart of palm). Kelupis, another snack frequently associated with the Bruneian Malays, Kedayan, and Dusun, is also a common snack for the Bisaya. Another traditional food is bubur kacang hijau (mung bean porridge), commonly eaten during the month of Ramadan for iftar by Bisaya Muslims in Labuan and Sabah.

=== Religion ===
The majority of contemporary Bisaya in Brunei, Sabah, and Labuan are Muslim, while those in Sarawak are mostly Christian. Traditionally, their belief system was animist—revering nature spirits and ancestors with a pagan worldview that emphasised maintaining balance with nature and caring for the dead. It also included oath-taking practices to settle major disputes and the belief in ipon, a spirit with the power to hunt and kill wrongdoers. The conversion of the Bisaya to Islam began with their leader Lok Batata in the 14th century. Prior to this event, local Bisaya governments were influenced by Buddhist and Hindu beliefs. Christian Bisaya, especially within Limbang, are either members of the Catholic Church or the Borneo Evangelical Church. The spread of Christianity within the region started in the 1930s, when two Bisaya children, whose mother had died during childbirth, were adopted by Australian missionaries.

=== Language ===
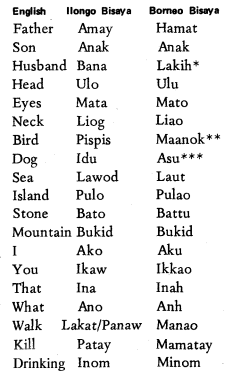
Bornean Bisaya and Ilonggo Bisaya comparison, with English translation

The Bisaya language of Sabah is very closely related to Tatana, one of the Dusun dialects, with which it shares 90% intelligibility, mainly due to intermarriage. It has 58% lexical similarity to the Sarawak dialects of Bisaya as well as 57%–59% with the Bruneian dialect. The Dusunic languages also have connections with many languages of the Philippines. Sarawak's Bisaya dialect shares at least 60% of its features with the Bruneian dialect.

== Notable people ==
- Lajim Ukin (1955–2021) – Malaysian federal deputy minister, Sabah state cabinet minister, Sabah Bisaya Association president
- Azizah Mohd Dun – former Beaufort MP
- Kamarlin Ombi – former Sabah state assistant minister and former member of the Sabah State Legislative Assembly for Lumadan
- Matbali Musah – Sipitang MP and former member of the Sabah State Legislative Assembly for Lumadan
- Ruslan Muharam – former State Assistant Minister to the Chief Minister of Sabah and member of the Sabah State Legislative Assembly for Lumadan
- Siti Aminah Aching – Beaufort MP
- Isnin Aliasnih – State Assistant Minister of Housing and Local Government of Sabah
