= Malaysia Federal Route 1 (Sabah) =

Road in Sabah, Malaysia

Federal Route 1

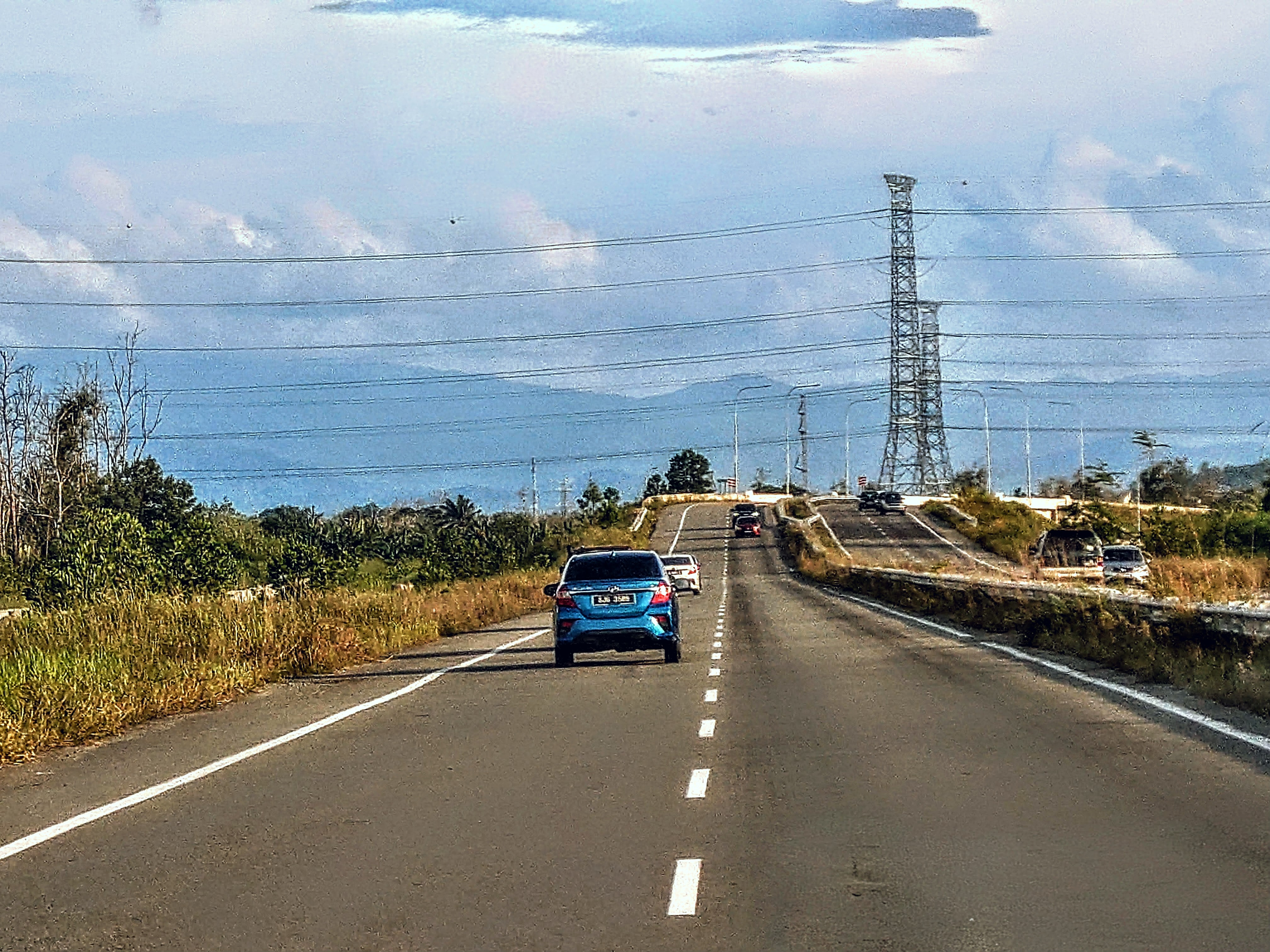
- Sabah Federal Route 1 in the Papar District, which is a new full dual carriageway to Kimanis and Beaufort.

Route information
- Part of AH150
- Maintained by Malaysian Public Works Department
- Length: 428 km (266 mi)

Major junctions
- Northeast end: Kudat
- SA12 Sapi–Nangoh Highway; FT 503 Berungis–Kota Belud Highway; FT 22 Federal Route 22; FT 606 Sepanggar Bay Highway; FT 500 Federal Route 500; FT 501 Jalan Penampang; Papar Spur Road; Kimanis–Keningau Highway; FT 502 Federal Route 502; SA3 Tenom–Sipitang Highway
- Southwest end: Sindumin (continues as Federal Route 1 (Sarawak))

Location
- Country: Malaysia
- Primary destinations: Kota Belud, Tamparuli, Kota Kinabalu, Donggongon, Papar, Kimanis, Beaufort, Sipitang

Highway system
- Highways in Malaysia; Expressways; Federal; State

The Sabah section of the Federal Route 1, Asian Highway Route AH150, is a 428 kilometres (266 mi) federal highway in Sabah, Malaysia, which is also a component of the larger Pan Borneo Highway network, specifically Phase 1A. The route was formed in 1996 during the merging of two former routes A1 (northern route, from Kota Kinabalu to Kudat) and A2 (southern route, from Kota Kinabalu to Sindumin near the Sabah-Sarawak border). The merging of the former routes formed an alternate route of Route 1 within the city of Kota Kinabalu. However, most maps still use the older route numbering scheme by referring to the northern section as A1 and the southern section as A2.

Generally, the highway runs along the west coast of Sabah. The highway continues as the Federal Route 1 (Sarawak) at the Sabah–Sarawak border. While the highway runs along the coastal, certain inland area are also rugged and hilly as it crosses the Crocker Range (on Route A1) which can quickly summit at 279 m (915 ft) above sea level. Its main route concurrency is Federal Route 22 and 503.

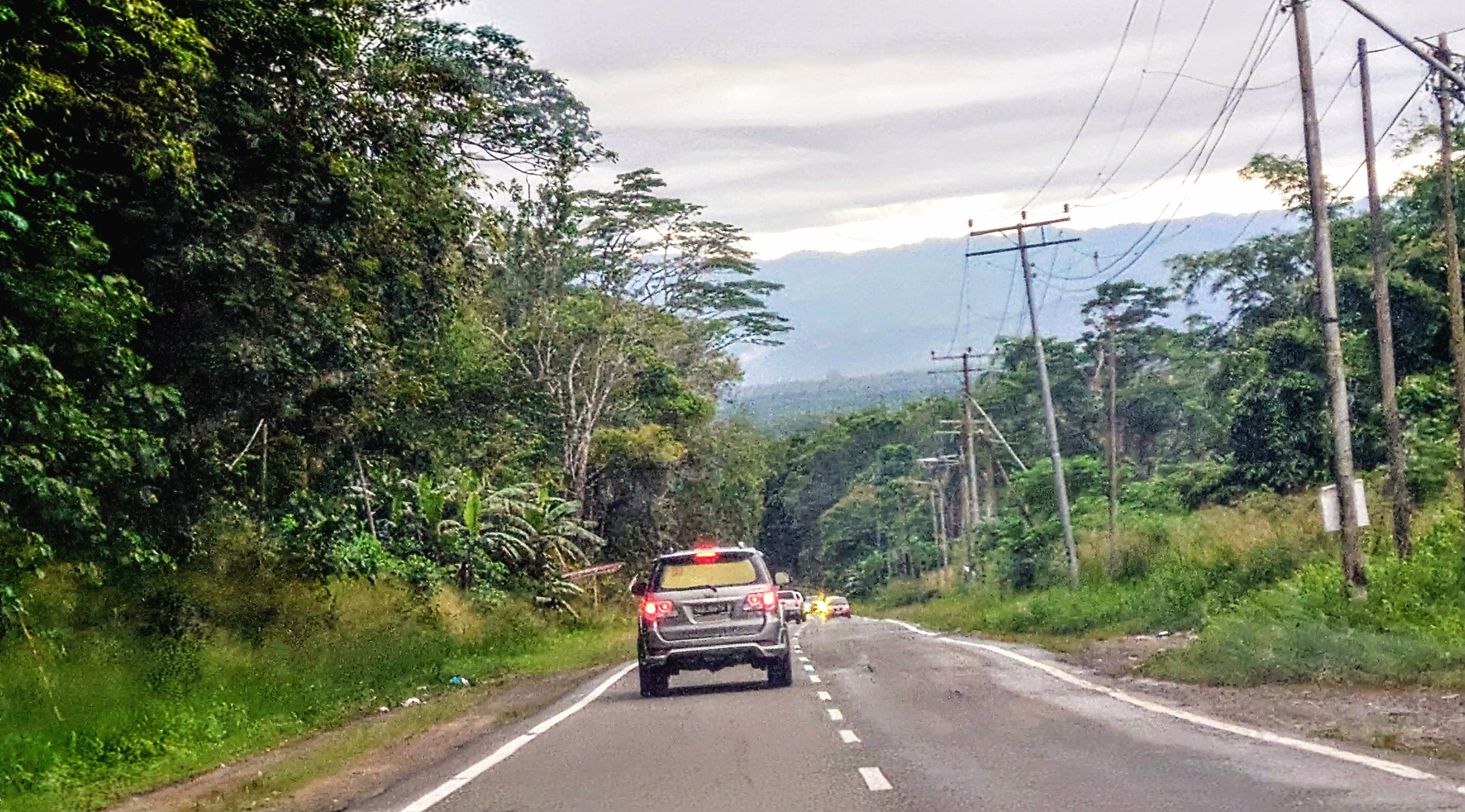
The highway where it traverses rugged high-altitude hilly area, near Langkon, Kota Marudu. The road is also one of the hilly routes in Sabah, considered as a hill pass.

One interesting feature about this federal highway is motorists crossing the Sabah-Sarawak border through the Federal Route 1 must pass through a customs and immigration checkpoint at Sindumin, even though the two neighbouring states are part of the federation of Malaysia.

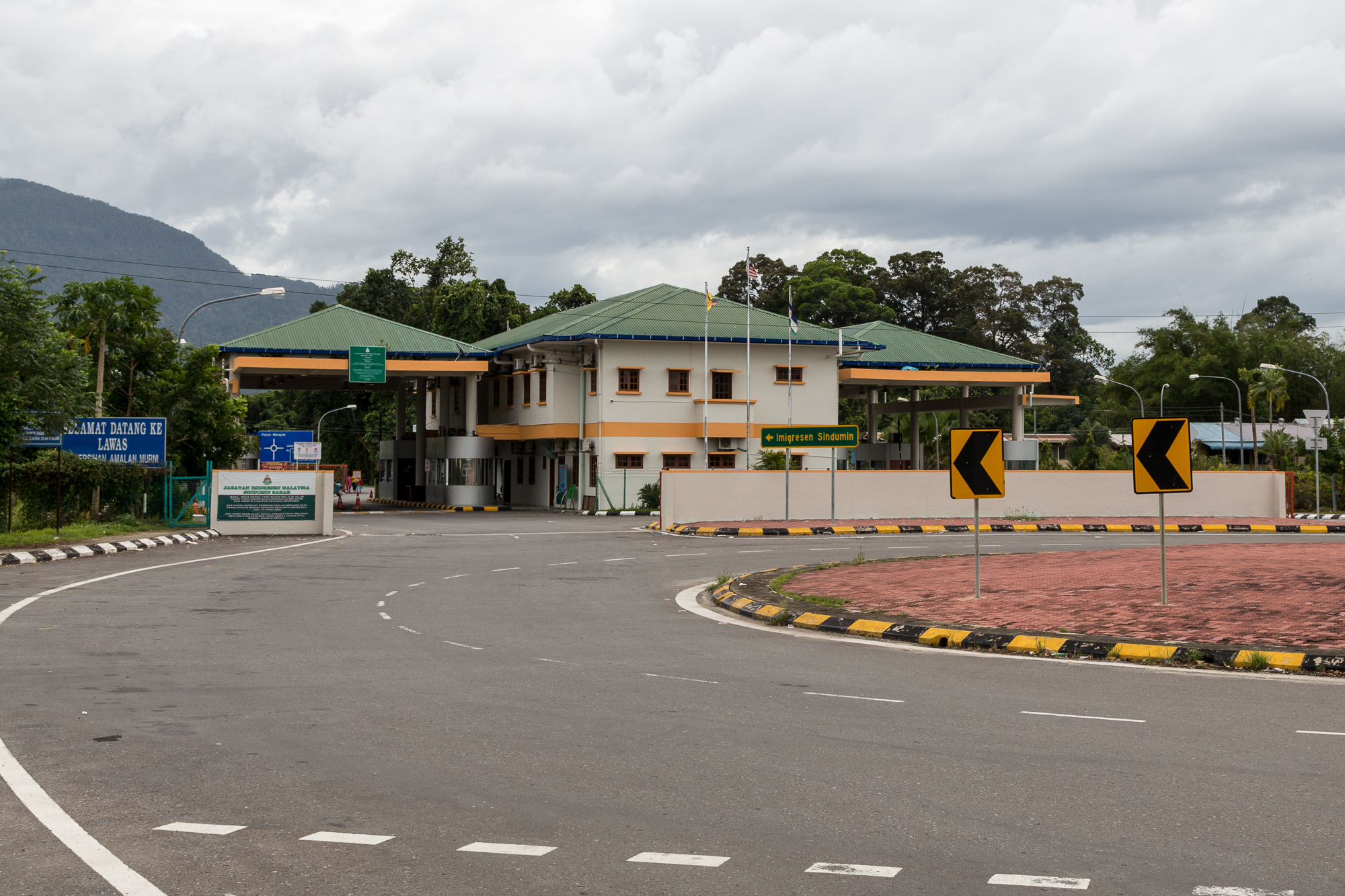
Sabah-Sarawak state border, Sindumin.

== Interchange lists ==
The entire route is located in Sabah.

Legend:

- I/C - Interchange, I/S - Intersection, RSA - Rest and service area, OBR - Overhead bridge restaurant, R/R - Restaurant and rest plaza, L/B - Layby, V/P - Vista point, TN - tunnel, T/P - Toll plaza, BR - Bridge
- C - Cloverleaf, S - Stack, T-A - Trumpet-A, T-B - Trumpet-B, DT - Directional-T/Y, SDT - Semi-Directional-T/Y, P-Y - Partial-Y, D - Diamond, P-C - Partial cloverleaf, D-D - Diverging diamond, D-R - Direct ramp

=== Northern route (former A1 section) ===
Division	District	Location	Km	Exit	Name	Destinations	Notes
Kudat	Kudat	Kudat			Kudat	Kudat town centre Jalan Bawah – Kudat airport	Roundabout; End/start of dual-carriageway
Kudat	Kudat	Sikuati			Bandar Sikuati Baru	Sikuati town centre	T-junctions
Kudat	Kudat	Parapat			Kg. Parapat Darat	Jalan Parapat Limau-Limauan	Junctions
Kudat	Kudat	Tambuluran			Kg. Tambuluran		
Kudat	Kudat	Matunggong			Matunggong	Matunggong town centre	Roundabout
Kudat	Kudat	Matunggong			Kg. Matunggong		
Kudat	Kota Marudu	Tigaman			Kg. Tigaman		
Kudat	Kota Marudu	Langkon			Langkon	SA12 Sapi–Nangoh Highway – Kota Marudu, Pitas, Paitan, Sandakan	T-junctions
Kudat	Kota Marudu	Mangaris			Kg. Mangaris		
Kudat	Kota Marudu	Mangaris			Kota Marudu bound, Engage lower gear -- m above sea level		
Kudat	Kota Marudu	Mangaris		R/R	Mangaris R&R complex (Kota Marudu bound)		
West Coast	Kota Belud	Nalapak			Nalapak	Kinabalu Park – Nalapak	Junctions
West Coast	Kota Belud	Kukut			Ulu Kukut Forest Reserve		Kota Belud bound
West Coast	Kota Belud	Kukut			Kota Belud bound, Engage lower gear -- m above sea level		
West Coast	Kota Belud	Kukut			Kg. Kukut		
West Coast	Kota Belud	Kota Belud			Kawang–Kawang Rosok	Jalan Kawang–Kawang Rosok – Jalan Botong Rosok	Junctions
West Coast	Kota Belud	Kota Belud			Kg. Jawi Jawi		
West Coast	Kota Belud	Kota Belud			Kota Belud; Kota Belud town centre	Jalan Kota Belud–Ranau – Kota Belud, Kundasang, Ranau	Roundabout
West Coast	Kota Belud	Kota Belud			Jalan Kota Belud Bypass I/S	FT 503 Berungis–Kota Belud Highway – Kota Marudu, Kudat	Signalised junctions
West Coast	Kota Belud	Kelawat			Kg. Kelawat		
West Coast	Kota Belud	Kelawat			Tuaran bound, Engage lower gear -- m above sea level		
West Coast	Kota Belud	Kelawat			Kelawat Forest Reserve		
West Coast	Tuaran	Tenghilan			Tenghilan		
West Coast	Tuaran	Tenghilan			Kg. Betotai		
West Coast	Tuaran	Tuaran		BR	Sungai Tuaran bridge		
West Coast	Tuaran	Tuaran			Tuaran	Tuaran town centre	Roundabout
West Coast	Tuaran	Berungis			Berungis Roundabout	FT 22 Tamparuli–Ranau Highway – Tamparuli, Ranau, Sandakan	Roundabout; Start/end of dual-carriageway
West Coast	Tuaran	Telipok			Telipok		
West Coast	Kota Kinabalu	Kota Kinabalu			Jalan Sepanggar I/C	FT 606 Sepanggar Bay Highway – Likas, Universiti Malaysia Sabah, Kota Kinabalu city centre	Upgraded to interchange
West Coast	Kota Kinabalu	Kota Kinabalu			Inanam		
West Coast	Kota Kinabalu	Kota Kinabalu			Kota Kinabalu; Luyang	Jalan Bukit Nenas – Karamunsing, Kota Kinabalu city centre Jalan Kolam– Bukit Padang, Jalan Bundusan	LILO with roundabout
West Coast	Kota Kinabalu	Kota Kinabalu			Kota Kinabalu; Jalan Penampang	FT 501 Jalan Penampang – Kota Kinabalu city centre, Penampang, Donggongon, Lok Kawi	Signalised intersection
West Coast	Kota Kinabalu	Kota Kinabalu			Kota Kinabalu; Jalan Pintas Penampang	FT 500 Penampang Bypass – Sembulan, Donggongon, Kota Kinabalu city centre, Tambunan, Keningau	Roundabout
West Coast	Kota Kinabalu	Tanjung Aru			Tanjung Aru; Kota Kinabalu International Airport	FT 1 Jalan Kepayan – Kota Kinabalu city centre, Beaufort, Sindumin	Diamond interchange

=== Southern route (former A2 section) ===
Division	District	Location	Km	Exit	Name	Destinations	Notes
West Coast	Kota Kinabalu	Tanjung Aru			Sepanggar-Tanjung Aru	see also Jalan Tun Fuad Stephens	
West Coast	Kota Kinabalu	Tanjung Aru			Tanjung Aru; Kota Kinabalu International Airport	FT 1 Tuaran Bypass – Kota Belud, Tuaran	Diamond interchange
West Coast	Putatan	Putatan			Putatan		
West Coast	Papar	Papar			Sabindo I/S	South; Papar Spur Road – Papar, Melinsung, Kinarut	Signalised T-junctions
West Coast	Papar	Papar			Lok Kawi	North; FT 501 Jalan Penampang – Penampang, Kota Kinabalu city centre	Signalised T-junctions; End/start of dual-carriageway
West Coast	Papar	Papar			Kinarut Spur Road	Kinarut town centre	
West Coast	Papar	Papar			Jalan Kawang	Kawang town centre	
West Coast	Papar	Papar		BR	Sungai Papar bridge		
West Coast	Papar	Papar			Papar Spur Roundabout	Papar Spur Road – Papar town centre Jalan Bongawan Estate – Bongawan, Bongawan Estate	Roundabout
West Coast	Papar	Kimanis			Kimanis	Kimanis-Keningau Highway – Crocker Range National Park. Keningau	Roundabout
West Coast	Papar	Bongawan			Bongawan Roundabout	Bongawan Spur Road – Bongawan town centre Jalan Bongawan Estate – Bongawan Estate, Papar	Roundabout
Interior	Beaufort	Bandau			Simpang Bandau	Jalan Bandau Kuala Penyu – Kuala Penyu, Sitompok	Signalised junctions
Interior	Beaufort	Membakut			Membakut		
Interior	Beaufort	Beaufort			Beaufort	FT 502 Federal Route 502 – Kuala Penyu, Menumbok, Labuan (via ferry)	T-junctions
Interior	Beaufort	Beaufort		BR	Sungai Padas bridge Beaufort Bridge		
Interior	Beaufort	Lingkungan			Kg. Lingkungan	Jalan Weston – Weston	T-junctions
Interior	Sipitang	Sipitang			Mesapol		
Interior	Sipitang	Sipitang			Sipitang	Sipitang town centre	Junctions
Interior	Sipitang	Sipitang			Sabah Forest Industries		
Interior	Sipitang	Mengalong			Mengalong	SA3 Sabah State Route SA3 – Tenom, Keningau	Roundabout
Interior	Sipitang	Sindumin			Sindumin	Sindumin town centre	Roundabout
Interior	Sipitang	Sindumin			Sindumin Checkpoint	Custom Complex	
Sabah-Sarawak border Through to FT 1 Federal Route 1 (Sarawak)

== See also ==
- Pan Borneo Highway
  - Malaysia Federal Route 1 (Sarawak)
  - Malaysia Federal Route 22
  - Malaysia Federal Route 13 (Sabah)
