= Malaysia Federal Route 502 =

Road in Malaysia

Federal Route 502

Route information
- Maintained by Malaysian Public Works Department
- Length: 70 km (43 mi)

Major junctions
- Southeast end: Beaufort
- FT 1 Federal Route 1 SA71 Jalan Kuala Penyu
- Northwest end: Menumbok

Location
- Country: Malaysia
- Primary destinations: Kuala Penyu; Labuan (via ferry)

Highway system
- Highways in Malaysia; Expressways; Federal; State

Federal Route 502 (formerly Federal Route A7) is a 70-km federal highway in Sabah, Malaysia, connecting Beaufort to Menumbok, before proceeding to Labuan via ferry services. It is commissioned as a tributary of the larger Pan Borneo Highway network, as it is the main highway from the main link (Federal Route 1) to Labuan.

== List of interchanges ==
Km	Exit	Interchange	To	Remarks
		Beaufort	North; FT 1 Kota Kinabalu; FT 1 Papar; FT 1 Kimanis East; FT 1 Beaufort town centre FT 1 Sipitang; FT 1 Sindumin	T-junction
		Kg. Limbawang	West; Jalan Bintuka; Kg. Bintuka; Kg. Lupak; Gadong	Roundabout
		Kg. Pilajau		
		Sungai Klias bridge		
		Kg. Kota Klias		
		KG. Kayul	Northeast; SA71 Jalan Kuala Penyu; Kuala Penyu; Bundu	Roundabout
		Kg. Malikai	FELCRA Kuala Penyu; Tanjung Balai	T-junction
		Menumbok	Menumbok town centre Mempakul; Menumbok jetty	Roundabout
