= Sapi–Nangoh Highway =

Road in Malaysia

Sabah Route R12
- Sapi–Nangoh Highway
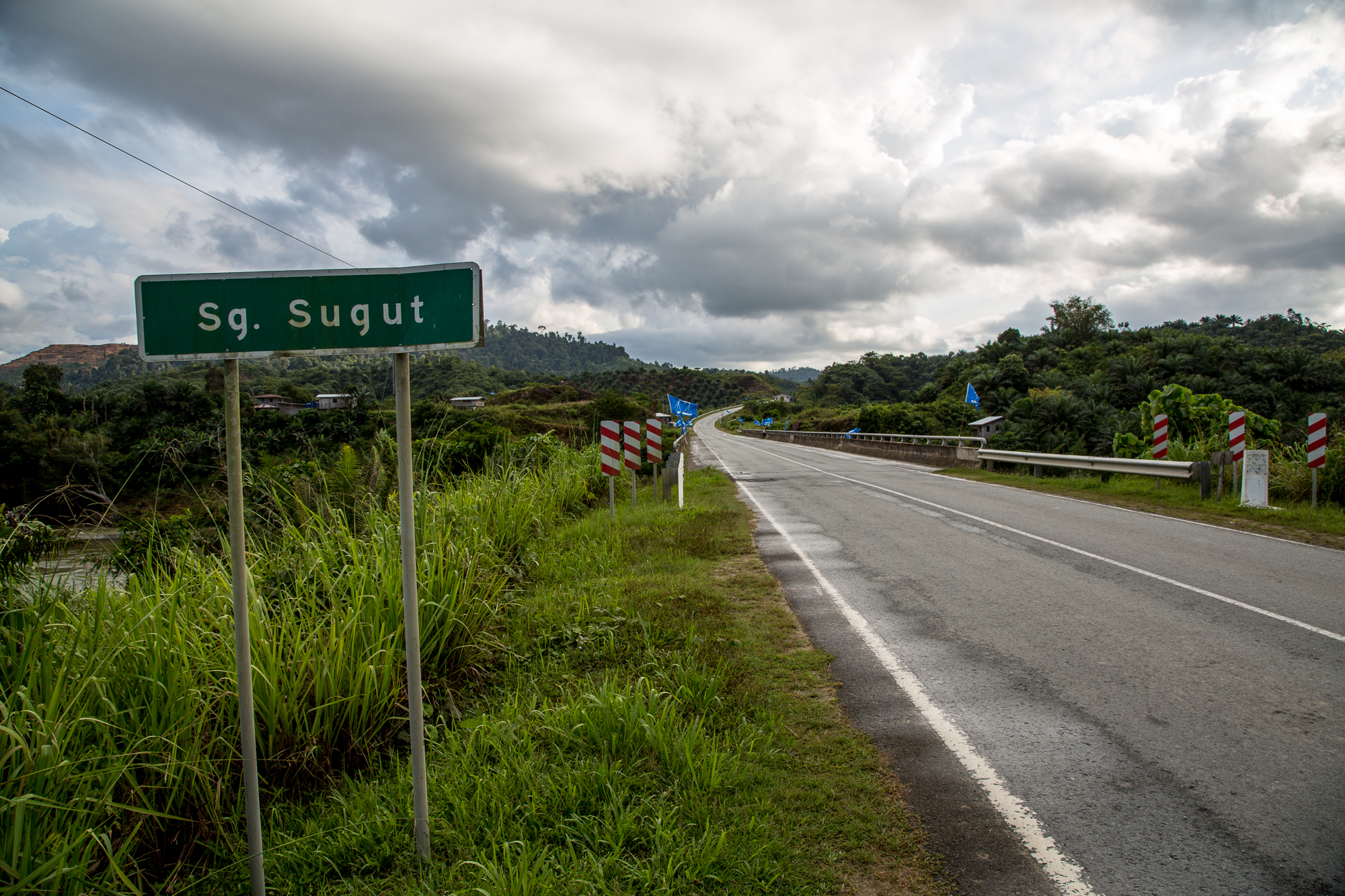
- The Sugut River bridge in the Jalan Nangoh Paitan Kanibungan.

Route information
- Length: 251 km (156 mi)

Major junctions
- North end: Kg. Langkon
- FT 1 Federal Route 1 FT 22 Federal Route 22
- South end: Sg. Sapi

Location
- Country: Malaysia
- Primary destinations: Kudat; Kota Marudu; Pitas; Paitan; Telupid; Beluran; Sandakan

Highway system
- Highways in Malaysia; Expressways; Federal; State

Sapi–Nangoh Highway (Malay: Jalan Sapi–Nangoh) is one of the major state highways in Sabah, Malaysia. This highway was constructed to connect the rural areas in northeast Sabah with Kudat and Sandakan, as well as to shorten the traveling distance from Kudat to Sandakan. The highway originally started as a road connecting Kudat to Kota Marudu, Pitas and the nearby areas before being extended southwards. It is coded as Route R12.

== Route background ==
Sapi–Nangoh Highway traverses through rugged and remote forest, including oil palm plantation. After passing through the town of Pitas, petrol station is more than 200 kilometres (120 mi), but petrol can still be obtained in small quantities in remote villages, but at a higher price than a regular petrol stations. Most remote area along the highway are also filled with potholes and gravel, including the one after passing the town of Paitan, which primarily causes by oil palm lorries. Just 49 kilometres (30 mi) away from the main town of Paitan, the road crosses a rugged hill passes, called Snake Hill (Malay: Bukit Ular) with too many bend, with heavily twisties road shape, only for 20 kilometres (12 mi), with road gradients exceeding up to 10%, quite steep. The road summit at 370 metres (1,210 ft) as being a hilly road in the Timimbang Forest Reserve of Sandakan Division though it can also feel mountainous due to its rugged topography and its winding road geometry which resembling a snake, hence why the hill pass named Snake Hill.

The road intersect with Telupid–Sandakan Highway after reaching Sungai Sapi. Unlike other state highway in the state that uses the 'SA' or 'A' suffix, the Sapi–Nangoh Highway uses the 'R' suffix code instead, though it can still be 'A12'.

== List of interchanges ==
Km	Exit	Interchange	To	Remarks
		Langkon	Jalan Langkon–Pitas; North; FT 1 Kudat West; FT 1 Kota Belud; FT 1 Tuaran; FT 1 Kota Kinabalu; FT 1 Beaufort; FT 1 Sindumin	T-junction
		Kg. Langkon		
		Kota Marudu	Kota Marudu town centre	Roundabout; Start/end of dual-carriageway
		Sg. Sumbilingon		End/start of dual-carriageway
		Popok	North; Popok South; Marak Parak Highway; Poring; Ranau	Roundabout
		Tandek	Tandek town centre	Junctions
		Kg. Pinggan Pinggan		
		Pitas	Pitas town centre	Junctions
		Sg. Bengkoka bridge		
		Jalan Kanibongan	Northwest; Jalan Bongkol; Bongol; Telaga; Mongkubau Laut Southeast; Jalan Kanibongan; Kanibongan; Paitan	T-junction
		Kg. Kabatasan Laut		
		Kanibongan	Jalan Nangoh Paitan Kanibungan Northeast; Kanibongan	Junction
		Jalan Paitan	North; Jalan Paitan; Paitan	T-junction
		Sungai Sungai		
		Kg. Lingkabau		
		Sg. Sugut		
		-- m above sea level		Kota Marudu bound, Engage lower gear
		Timimbang Forest Reserve -- m above sea level		
		-- m above sea level		Sandakan bound, Engage lower gear
		Kg. Botitian		
		Kg. Basai		
		Kg. Ulu Sapi		
		Jalan Sandakan–Telupid	West; FT 22 Telupid; FT 22 Ranau; FT 22 Tamparuli; FT 1 Kota Kinabalu East; FT 22 Sandakan; FT 13 Lahad Datu; FT 13 Tawau	T-junction

== Gallery ==
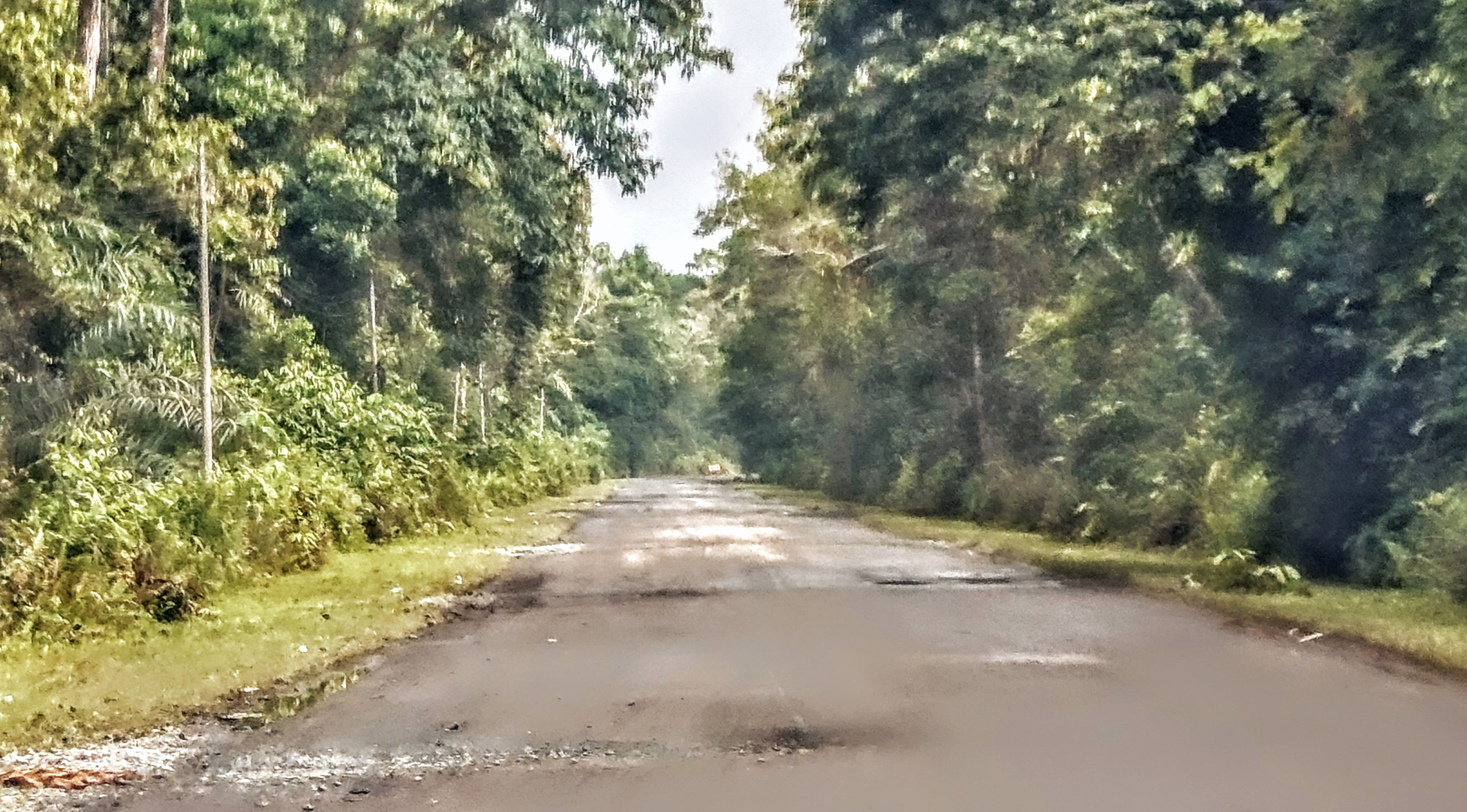
A damaged road in some section of Jalan Nangoh Paitan Kanibungan.

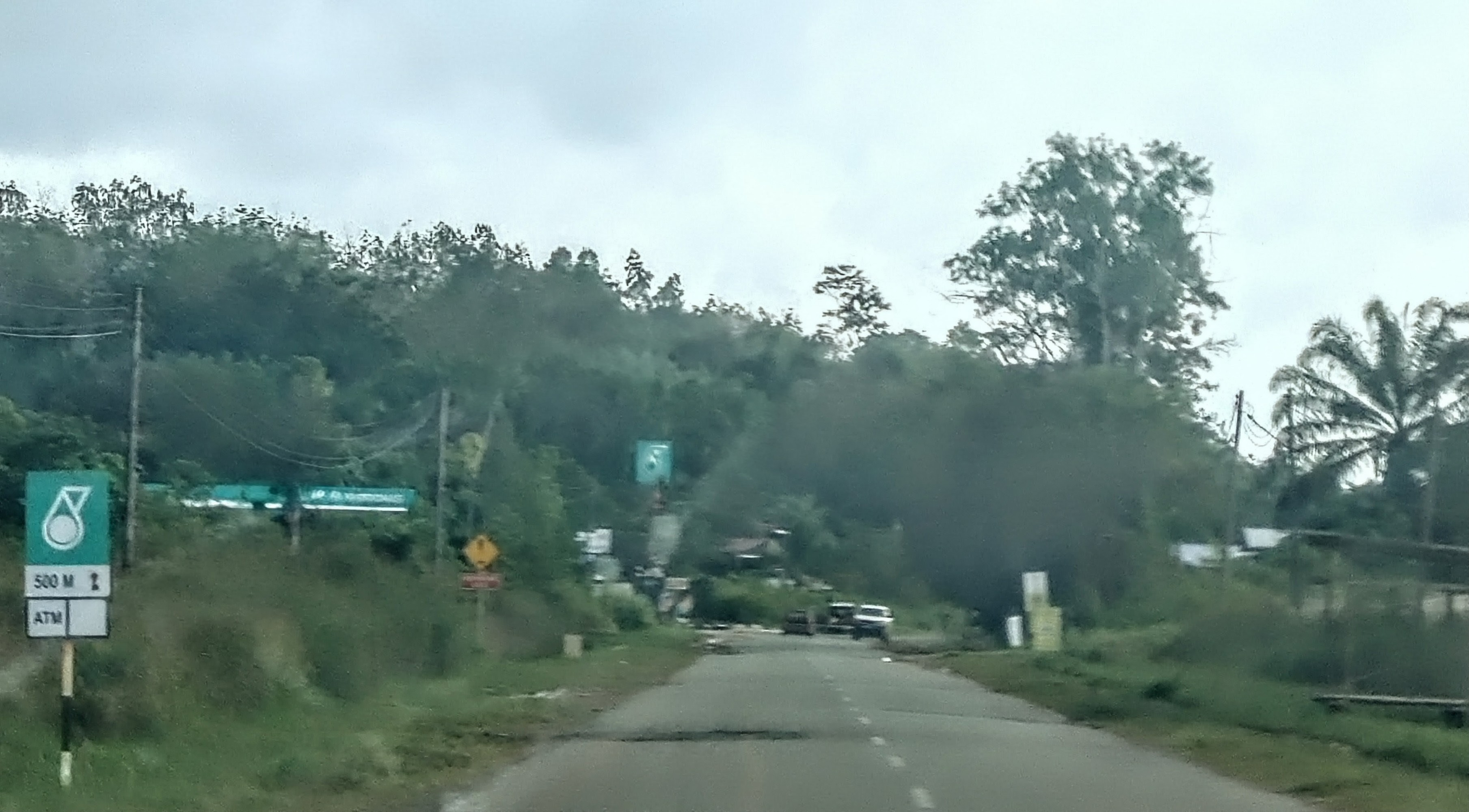
Around the Paitan Town, a Petronas gas station provided. Formerly Shell in 2020.

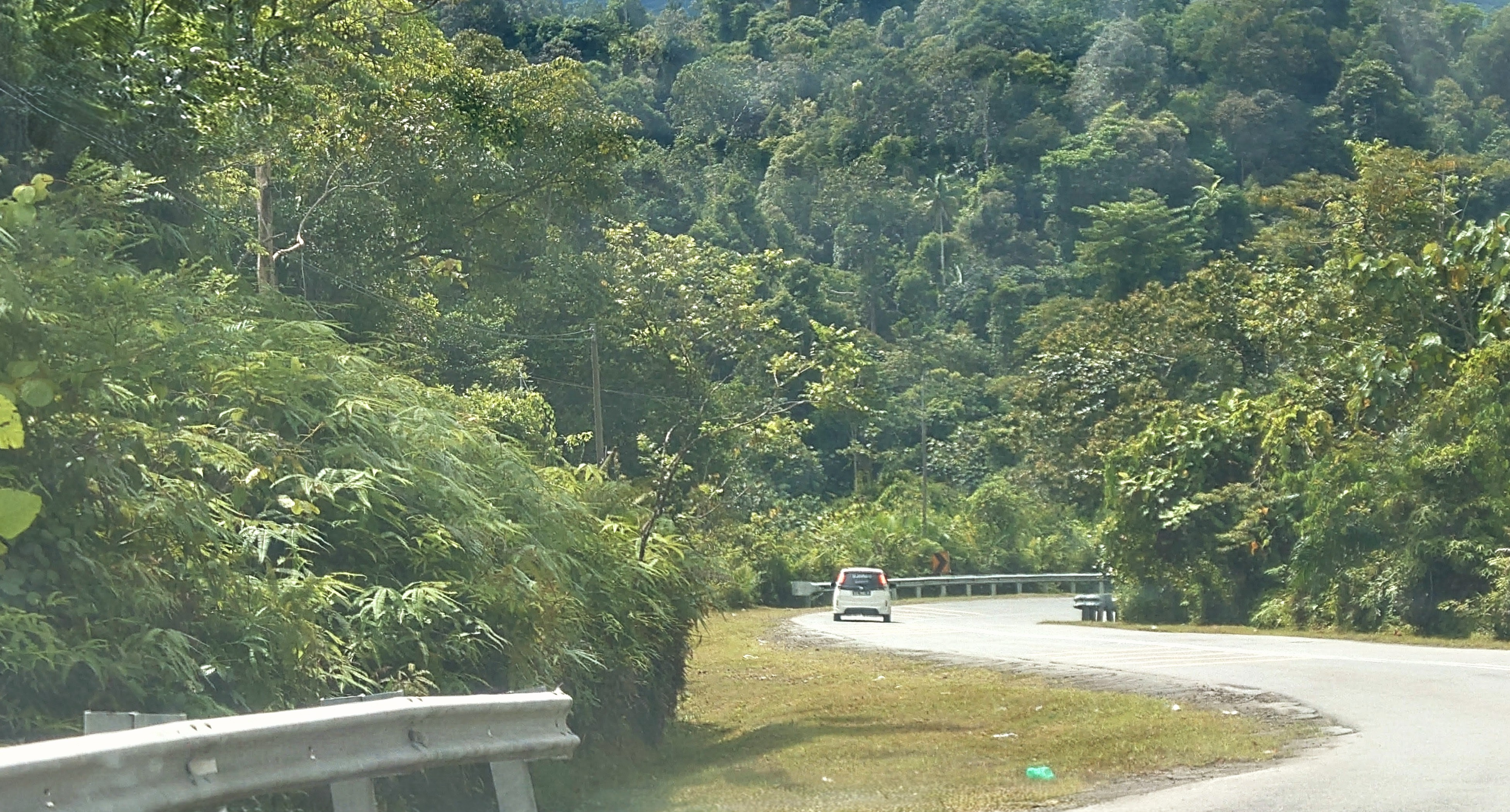
The 20 km (12 mi) Snake Hill Pass.

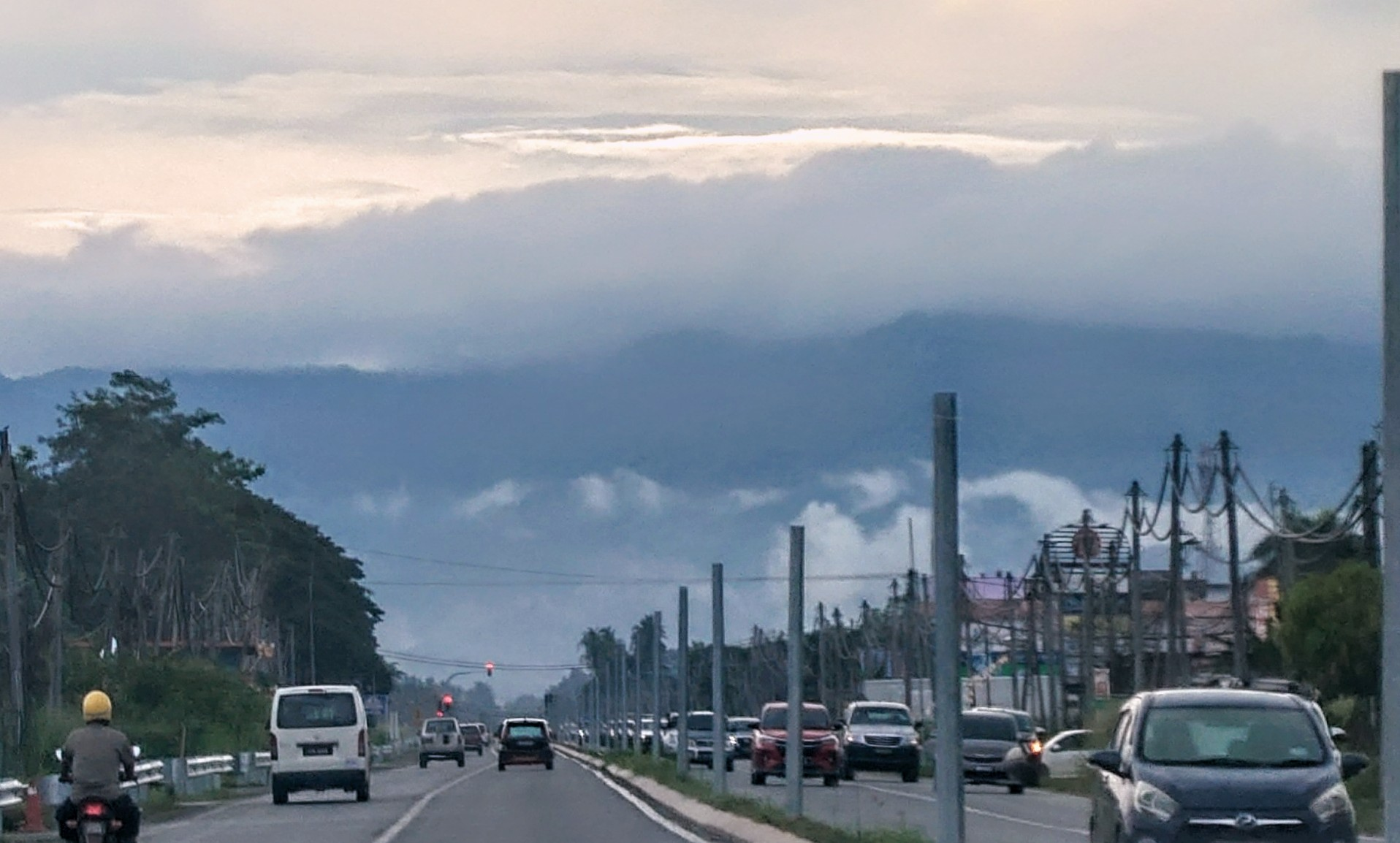
Jalan Langkon Pitas, in the town of Kota Marudu.
