= Malaysia Federal Route 503 =

Road in Malaysia

Federal Route 503
- Jalan Berungis–Kota Belud
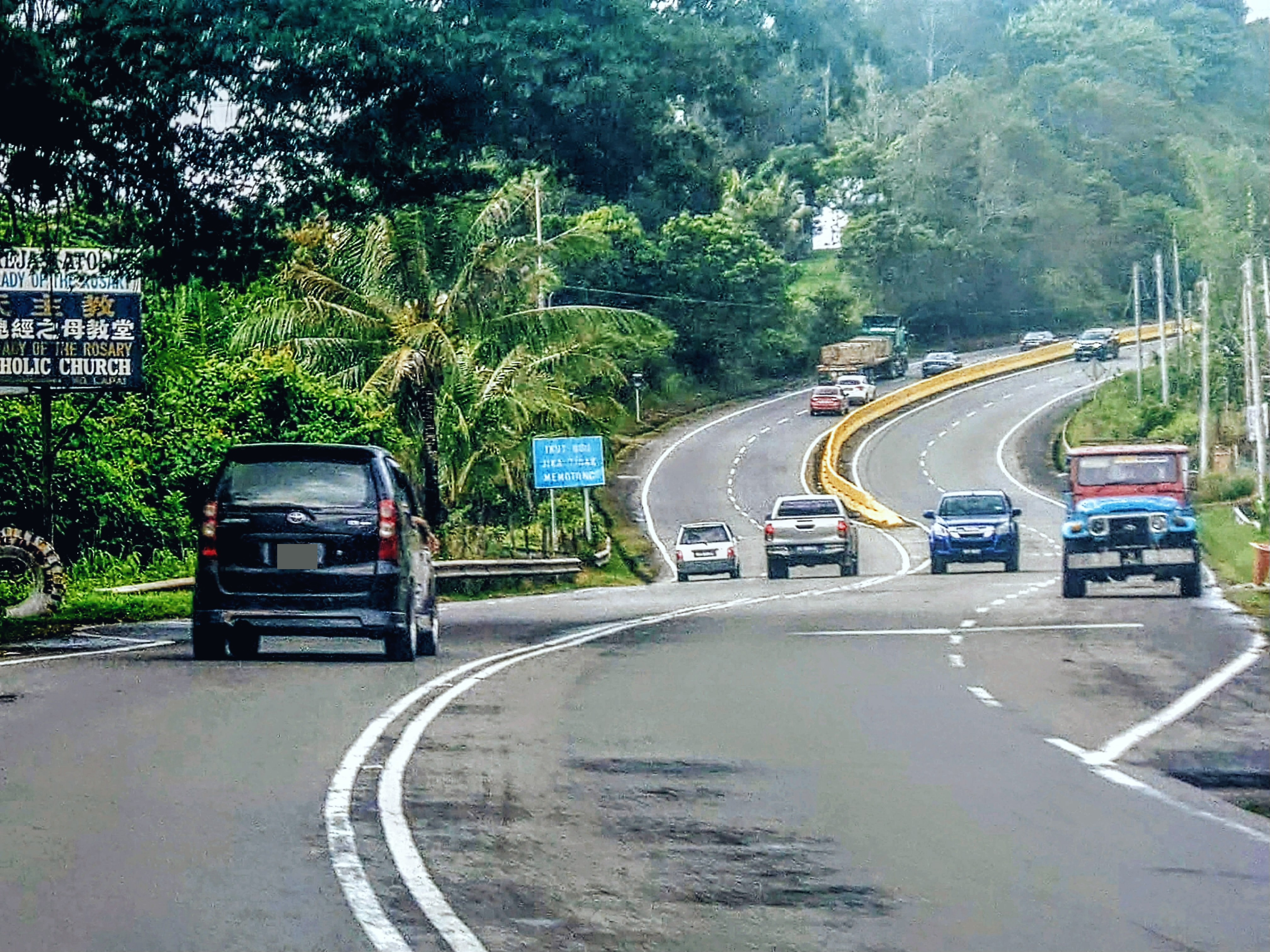
- The federal highway, near Tenghilan where the hilly sections start. Note the dual carriageway (2+2) as climbing lane.

Route information
- Part of AH150
- Maintained by Malaysian Public Works Department
- Length: 38.1 km (23.7 mi)

Major junctions
- South end: Tuaran
- FT 22 Federal Route 22; FT 1 Federal Route 1 Kota Belud–Ranau Highway
- Northeast end: Kota Belud

Location
- Country: Malaysia
- Primary destinations: Tuaran, Kota Belud (continues to Kota Marudu, Kudat)

Highway system
- Highways in Malaysia; Expressways; Federal; State

Federal Route 503 (also known as Berungis–Kota Belud Highway) is a 38.1 kilometres (23.7 mi) federal highway in Sabah, Malaysia that connects the Berungis roundabout all the way to Kota Belud town. Part of the Pan-Borneo Highway, it is frequently used by driver from Kota Kinabalu to Kudat.

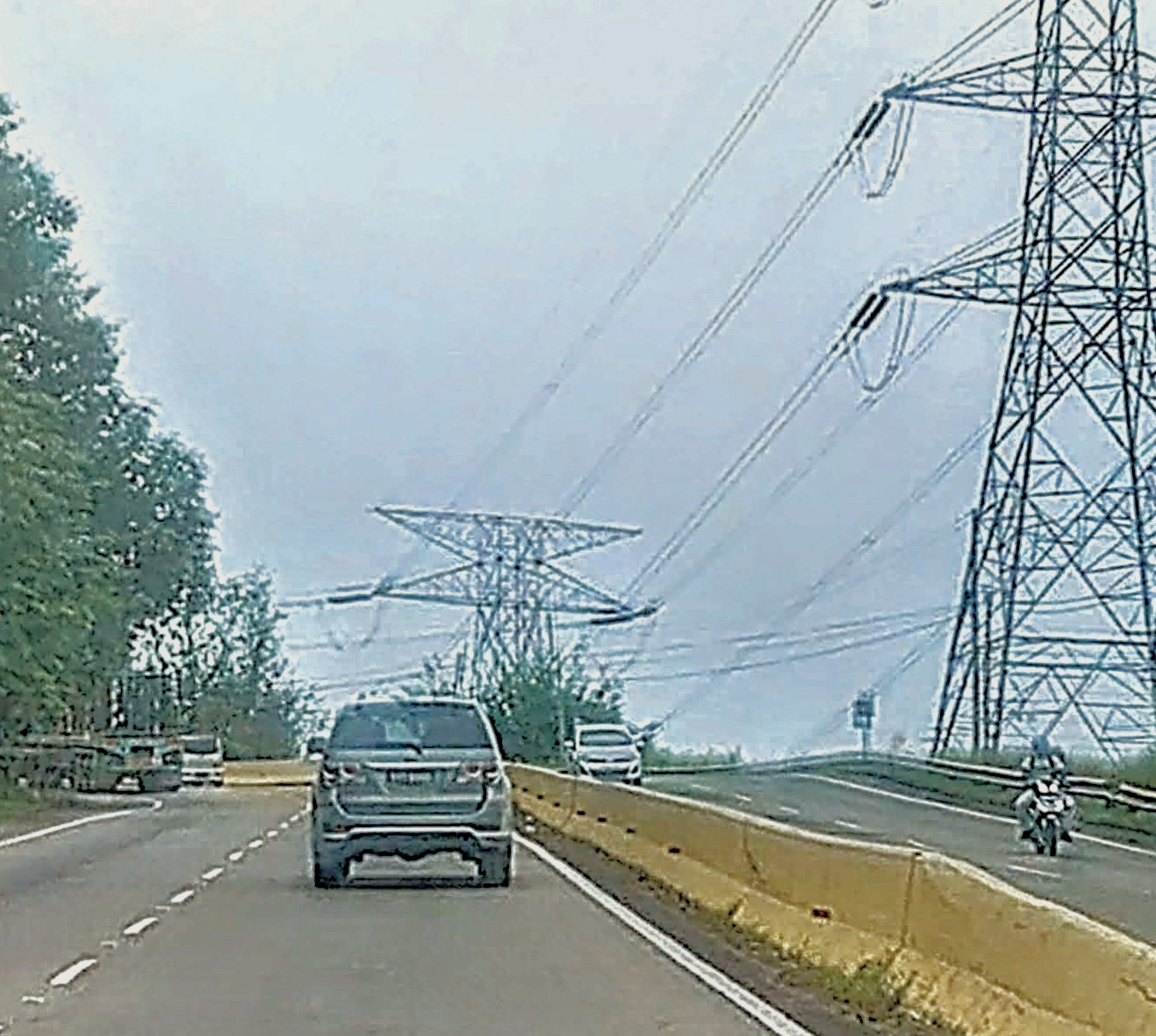
Steepest road of the highway, featuring a climbing lane as a dual carriageway.

== Route background ==
Federal Route 503 starts from the Berungis Roundabout where it intersect with Federal Route 22, as well as part of a route concurrency with Sabah Federal Route 1. The road is flat to gently undulating road with speed limit between 60 and 80km/h to Tenghilan. The road which runs between Tenghilan and Kampung Kelawat crosses the foothill of Crocker Range, which only summit at 200 m (660 ft) on Kelawat Forest Reserve. It is a hilly road with dedicates climbing lane configured as dual carriageway (2+2 road), with gradients mostly ranging between 10% and 12%, most light vehicle are still fast enough though a heavy-duty vehicle like a lorry will stay on the left lane. Within this hilly section, most declines are only up to 50km/h speed limit.

Because of its gradient with the addition of climbing road lane as 2+2 road, it is considered as one of the steepest road in the Malaysian state of Sabah. Additionally, it also provides a view of the Mount Kinabalu along the Crocker Mountains. Considered as a hill pass that only elevated on 200 metres (660 ft), the hill pass was often called Kelawat Hill (Malay: Bukit Kelawat) by most people in Kota Belud.

== History ==
The FT503 Jalan Bulatan Berungis–Bulatan Mengkabong upgrade project amounted RM150.7 millions is finalised in specify surface designation final stage in December 2024 by Ministry of Works.

== Junction lists ==
The entire route is located in West Coast Division, Sabah.

Legend:

- I/C - Interchange, I/S - Intersection, RSA - Rest and service area, OBR - Overhead bridge restaurant, R/R - Restaurant and rest plaza, L/B - Layby, V/P - Vista point, TN - tunnel, T/P - Toll plaza, BR - Bridge
- C - Cloverleaf, S - Stack, T-A - Trumpet-A, T-B - Trumpet-B, DT - Directional-T/Y, SDT - Semi-Directional-T/Y, P-Y - Partial-Y, D - Diamond, P-C - Partial cloverleaf, D-D - Diverging diamond, D-R - Direct ramp

District	Location	km	mi	Name	Destinations	Notes
Tuaran	Tuaran			Berungis roundabout	FT 22 Federal Route 22 – Tamparuli, Ranau, Sandakan FT 1 Federal Route 1 – Telipok, Menggatal, Kota Kinabalu	Roundabout; End/start of dual-carriageway
Tuaran	Tuaran			Tuaran		Roundabout
Tuaran	Tuaran			Sungai Tuaran bridge		
Tuaran	Tuaran			Kg. Betotai		
Tuaran	Tamparuli				FT 1 Tamparuli–Kota Belud Highway – Topokon, Tamparuli	Signalised junctions
Tuaran	Tamparuli			Tenghilan		
Tuaran	Tamparuli			-- m above sea level Tuaran bound, Engage lower gear		
Tuaran	Tamparuli			Kelawat Forest Reserve I/S		Engage lower gear
Kota Belud	Kota Belud			-- m above sea level Kota Belud bound, Engage lower gear		
Kota Belud	Kota Belud			Kg. Kelawat	Jalan Lama Kota Belud	T-junction
Kota Belud	Kota Belud			Kota Belud; Jalan Kota Belud Bypass I/S	Jalan Kota Belud Bypass – Kota Marudu, Kudat	Junctions
Kota Belud	Kota Belud			Kota Belud; Kota Belud town centre	Kota Belud–Ranau Highway – Kota Belud, Kundasang, Ranau FT 1 Federal Route 1 – Kota Marudu, Pitas, Kudat	Roundabout
1.000 mi = 1.609 km; 1.000 km = 0.621 mi: Concurrency terminus

== Gallery ==
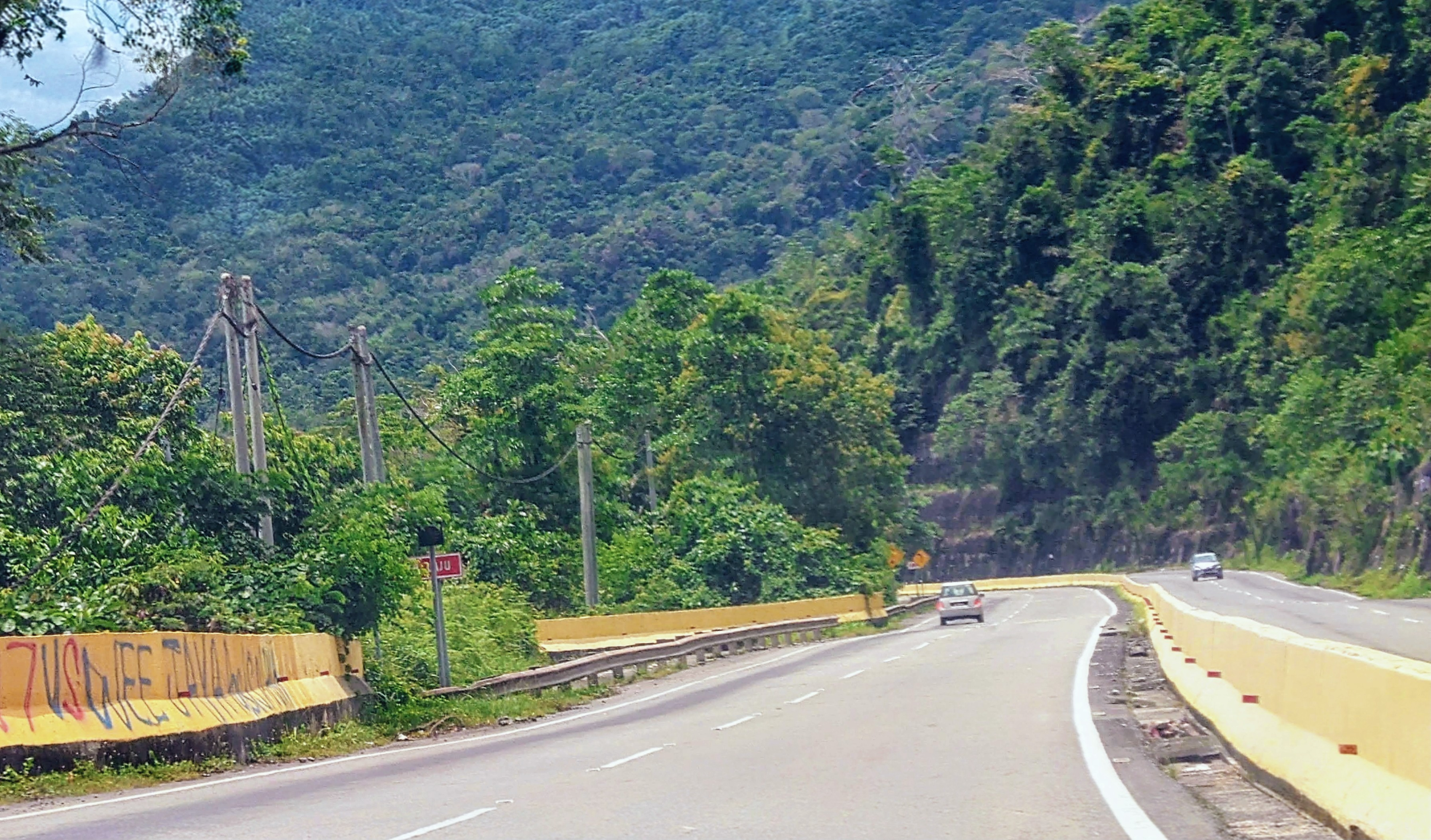
The steepest downhill of FT503 Berungis–Kota Belud Highway, which reach up to 12% steep road gradient.
