= Marak Parak Highway =

Road in Malaysia

- The rugged drive to Marak Parak.

Route information
- Length: 83 km (52 mi)

Major junctions
- North end: Kota Marudu (continues as Pan Borneo Highway)
- SA12 Sapi–Nangoh Highway; FT 22 Federal Route 22
- South end: Poring, Ranau (continues as Federal Route 22/Interior North–South Highway)

Location
- Country: Malaysia
- Districts: Kota Marudu, Ranau
- Primary destinations: Kota Marudu, Kudat, Pitas, Ranau

Highway system
- Highways in Malaysia; Expressways; Federal; State

Marak Parak Highway (Malay: Jalan Marak Parak) is a state highway in the Malaysian state of Sabah. The highway used to connects the nearby town of Kota Marudu to Ranau.

Usually, when taking a trip to Ranau from Kota Marudu or nearby northern area such as Kudat or Pitas would take driver to a longer route via Kota Belud (Kota Belud–Ranau Highway) or Tuaran (Federal Route 22) since the highway is formerly a logging road until 2014 where it was upgraded to a two-lane paved highway.

== Route background ==
450 metres (1,480 ft) road section, known as part of the fog zone in the highway.

Marak Parak Highway starts from a single roundabout within the Sapi–Nangoh Highway in Kota Marudu and terminus at the junction to Poring at Federal Route 22. The road runs parallel to the Kinabalu Park and crosses rugged mountainous terrain of the Crocker Range. Although the road only peaks at 770 metres (2,530 ft), the road feature highly steep road gradient from 10 to 16% after passing through the village of Marak Parak and like other hilly road, the road feature twisties, with climbing road lane. Apparently, only the entire route to Marak Parak from Kota Marudu is moderately steep, which the road also summit at 262 metres (860 ft).

The road used JKR R4 road standard, with every speed limit of the hilly road is 50km/h, while a short straight segment is 70km/h. The road also used the yellow line road marking for its foggy area up to 770 m (2,530 ft), as well as a transverse rumble strips before descending into a 13% road grade near Kampung Melangkap.

== Junction lists ==
The entire route is located in Sabah.

Legend:

- I/C - Interchange, I/S - Intersection, RSA - Rest and service area, OBR - Overhead bridge restaurant, R/R - Restaurant and rest plaza, L/B - Layby, V/P - Vista point, TN - tunnel, T/P - Toll plaza, BR - Bridge
- C - Cloverleaf, S - Stack, T-A - Trumpet-A, T-B - Trumpet-B, DT - Directional-T/Y, SDT - Semi-Directional-T/Y, P-Y - Partial-Y, D - Diamond, P-C - Partial cloverleaf, D-D - Diverging diamond, D-R - Direct ramp

Division	District	Location	km	mi	Name	Destinations	Notes
Kudat	Kota Marudu	Kota Marudu	0.0	0.0	Kota Marudu town centre	SA12 Sapi–Nangoh Highway – Kota Marudu, Kudat, Kota Kinabalu, Tandek, Pitas, Kanibongan, Paitan	Roundabout
Kudat	Kota Marudu	Kota Marudu	4.1	2.5	Timbang Batu	Jalan Timbang Batu – Timbang Batu Jalan Lotong – Kota Marudu	Roundabout
Kudat	Kota Marudu	Kota Marudu	10.0	6.2	-- 200m above sea level		
Kudat	Kota Marudu	Marak Parak	28	17	Kg. Marak Parak	Jalan Sorinsim – Sorinsim	T-junction
Kudat	Kota Marudu	Marak Parak	36	22	-- 300m above sea level		
Kudat	Kota Marudu	Marak Parak	37.6	23.4	Kg. Surun-Surun		
Kudat	Kota Marudu	Marak Parak	39	24	Kota Marudu bound, Engage lower gear -- +300m above sea level With extreme steep gradient		
Kudat	Kota Marudu	Marak Parak	40.4	25.1	-- 450m above sea level		
Kudat	Kota Marudu	Marak Parak	41.4	25.7	Mensalong Forest Reserve -- 600m above sea level		
West Coast	Ranau	Ranau	42.8	26.6	-- 770m above sea level Descending from highlands		
West Coast	Ranau	Ranau	47	29	Kg. Monggis	Jalan Monggis – Monggis	Junctions
West Coast	Ranau	Ranau	51.8	32.2	Kg. Pinawantai		T-junction
West Coast	Ranau	Ranau	59.5	37.0	Terawas; Jalan Togop Poring	Jalan Terawas – Terawas	Signalised T-junction
West Coast	Ranau	Ranau	60	37	Ranau bound, Engage lower gear -- 400m above sea level With extreme steep gradient		
West Coast	Ranau	Ranau	65.7	40.8	Kg. Perancangan		
West Coast	Ranau	Ranau	72.9	45.3	-- 400m above sea level		
West Coast	Ranau	Ranau	74.8	46.5	Togop Poring	Jalan Bongkud Singaron Baru – Poring	Roundabout
West Coast	Ranau	Ranau	83	52	Kg. Kilimu	FT 22 Federal Route 22 – Ranau, Kundasang, Tamparuli, Kota Kinabalu, Telupid, Beluran, Sandakan, Lahad Datu, Tawau	Signalised T-junction
1.000 mi = 1.609 km; 1.000 km = 0.621 mi

== Highway use ==
Although the highway is quite long, Marak Parak Highway serves as a short alternative to the Sapi–Nangoh Highway when driving from Kudat to Sandakan, reduced the distance by 37 (407km > 370km). The highway also feature a much good road condition compared to the Sapi–Nangoh Highway, which was damaged and riddles with potholes. Additionally, the highway can also led driver to the village of Interior Division area, after passing through the Ranau Town.

== See also ==
- Infrastructure in Kota Marudu

== Certain incidents ==
- In 23 November 2018, a bus loses control when descending off the high-altitude mountainous section. All 29 people suffered minor injuries, seven other victim was reported with a serious condition, but five people died.
- 12 January 2018, the 36 km (22 mi) part of the road, the road collapse by landslide, and two locals on a motorcycle were buried alive by the landslip.
- At 26 January 2023, Marak Parak Highway was once closed by a falling bush due to landslide causes by flood in Kota Marudu.
- 30 January 2025, KM 6.4 of Marak Parak Highway is closed, due to a flood and landslide.
