= Beaufort District =

Beaufort District Daerah Beaufort
- District
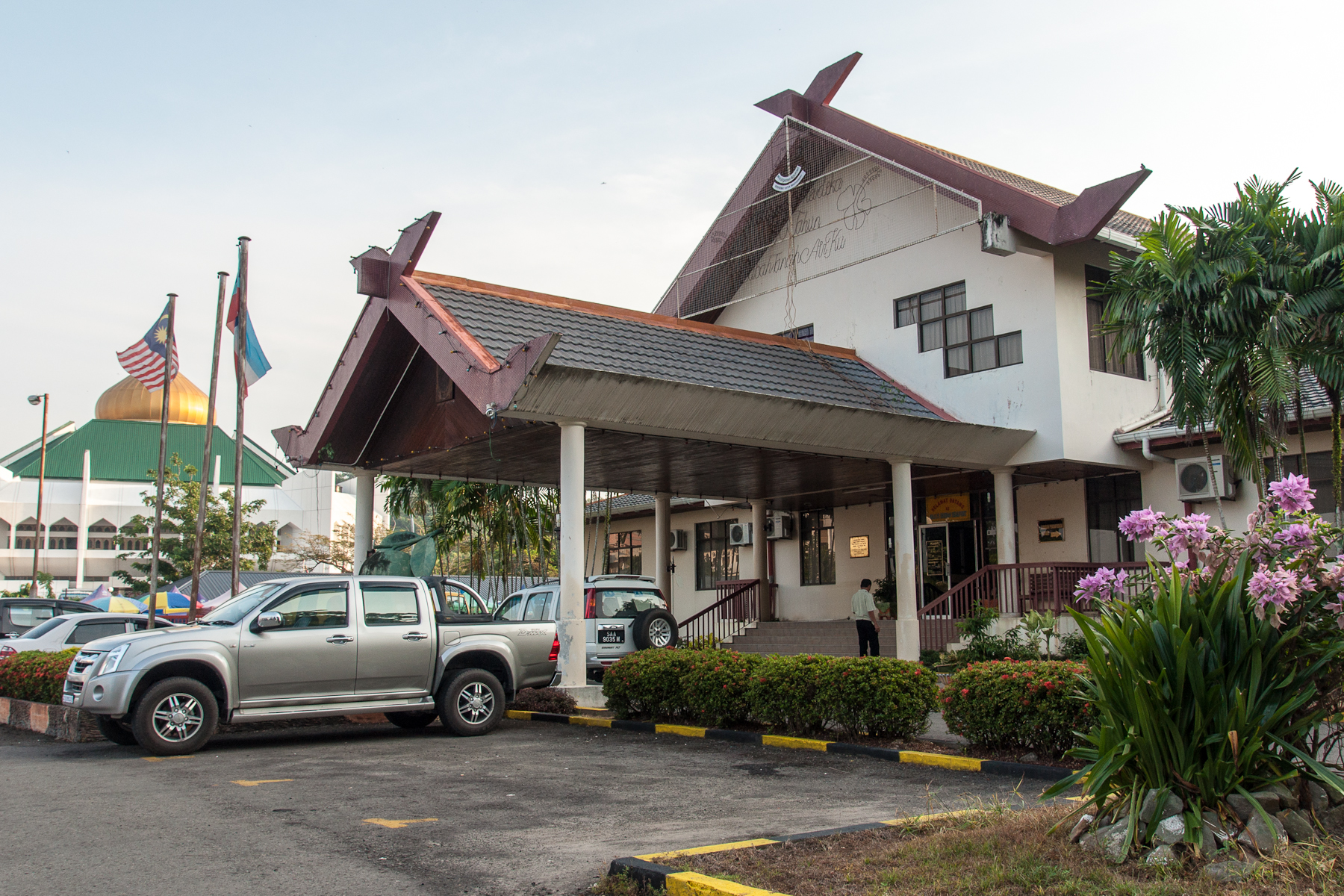
- Beaufort District Council office.

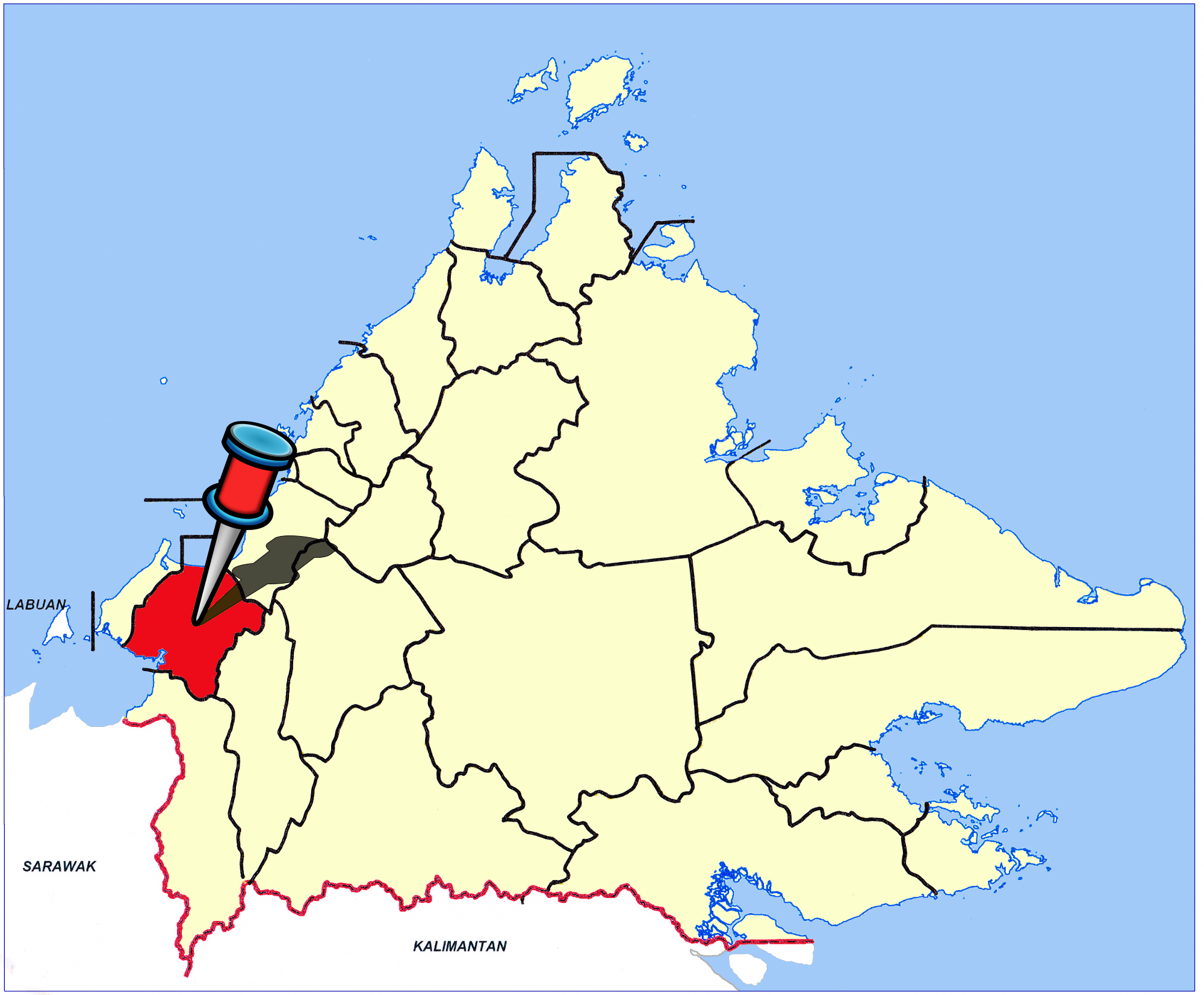

- Coordinates: 5°20′44.84″N 115°44′40.43″E
- Country: Malaysia
- State: Sabah
- Division: Interior
- Capital: Beaufort

Government
  - District Officer: Mohd. Nazri Ajun

Area
  - Total: 1,735 km^{2} (670 sq mi)

Population (2020)
  - Total: 83,463
  - Density: 48.11/km^{2} (124.6/sq mi)
- Postcode: 89XXX
- Vehicle registration plates: SB
- Website: mdbeaufort.sbh.gov.my pdbeaufort.sbh.gov.my

The Beaufort District (/ˈboʊfərt/ BOH-fərt; Malay: Daerah Beaufort) is an administrative district in the Malaysian state of Sabah, part of the Interior Division which includes the districts of Beaufort, Keningau, Kuala Penyu, Nabawan, Sipitang, Tambunan and Tenom. The population of Beaufort is composed mainly of Bisaya, Brunei Malays, Kadazan-Dusuns, Lun Bawang/Lun Dayeh, Muruts and Chinese (mainly Hakkas).

== Etymology ==
The district was named after the former British North Borneo governor, Leicester Paul Beaufort.

== History ==
The area of Beaufort was discovered by the British in 1898 during the administration of the North Borneo Chartered Company.

== Demographics ==
Historical population
Year	Pop.	±%
1991	48,742	—
2000	62,200	+27.6%
2010	64,350	+3.5%
2020	75,716	+17.7%

According to the 2020 census, the population by constituency was 52,107 inhabitants. The main indigenous people of Beaufort are Bisaya, Brunei Malay as well as Kadazan-Dusun (Dusun Tatana, Klias River Dusun, Kadazan Tangaa' Bakud-Kuizou and Tinagas tribes) and minorities of Murut, Chinese and Lun Bawang/Lundayeh peoples resident in this district.

Ethnic composition of Beaufort District (2020)
Ethnicities	Percentage
Malays (incl. Bruneian Malays)	24.23%
Kadazan-Dusun	28.87%
Bajau	10.05%
Murut	2.32%
Other Bumiputeras	28.97%
Chinese	4.49%
Indians	0.17%
Others	0.89%

Composition of Malaysian and non-Malaysian in Beaufort District (2020)
Nationality	Percentage
Malaysian	93.08%
Non-Malaysian (incl. illegal immigrants)	6.92%

Ethnicity	2020	
Ethnicity	Pop.	%
Malays (incl. Bruneian Malays)	11754	22.56%
Kadazan-Dusun	14004	26.88%
Bajau	4875	9.36%
Murut	1123	2.16%
Other Bumiputeras	14053	26.97%
Chinese	2176	4.18%
Indians	83	0.16%
Others	434	0.83%
Malaysian total	48502	93.08%
Non-Malaysian	3605	6.92%
Total	52107	100.00%

The population by state legislative assembly are as follows:

Beaufort (federal constituency)	52,107 inhabitants
N.32 Klias	28,397
N.33 Kuala Penyu	23,710

== Gallery ==
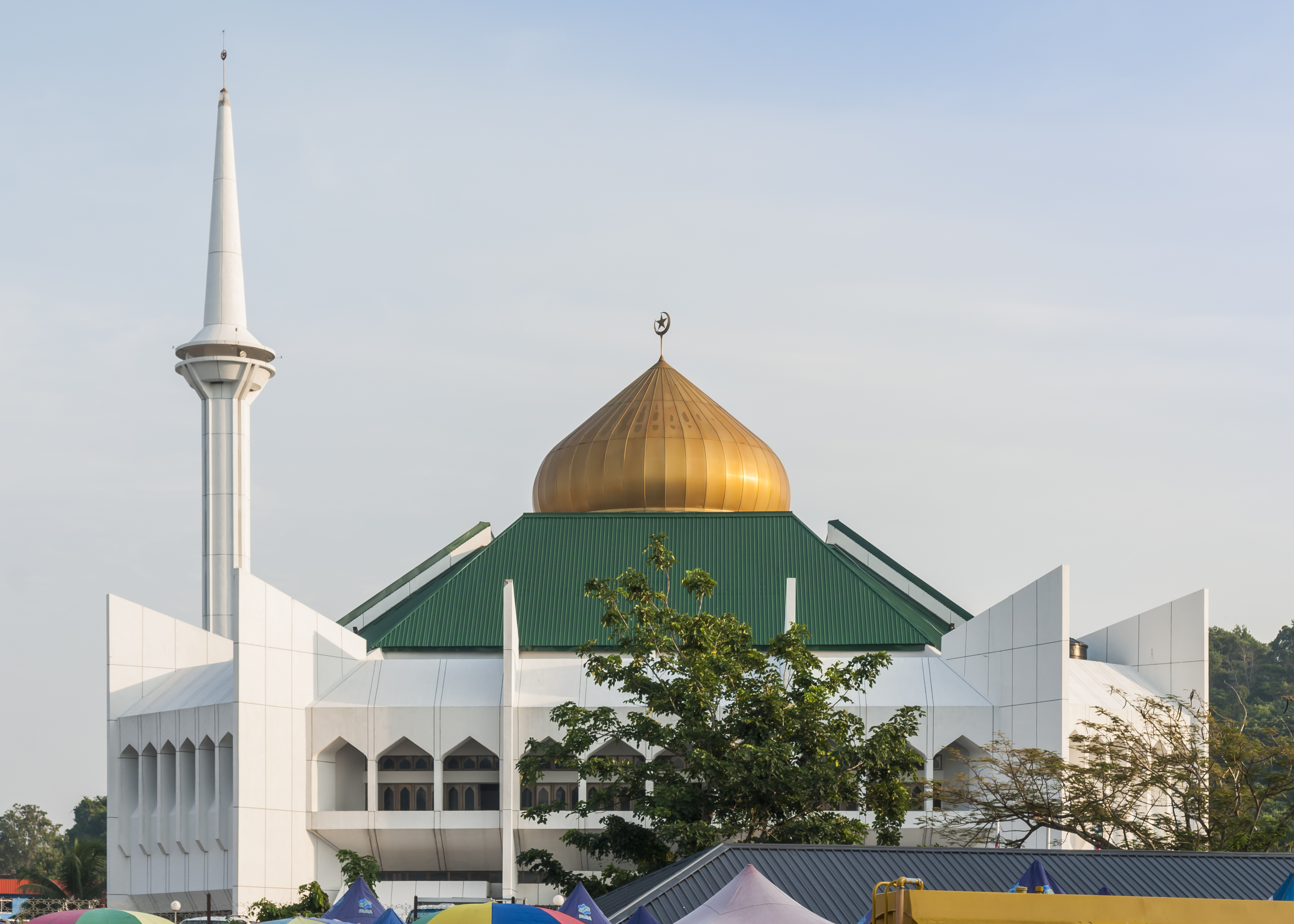
Beaufort Mosque.

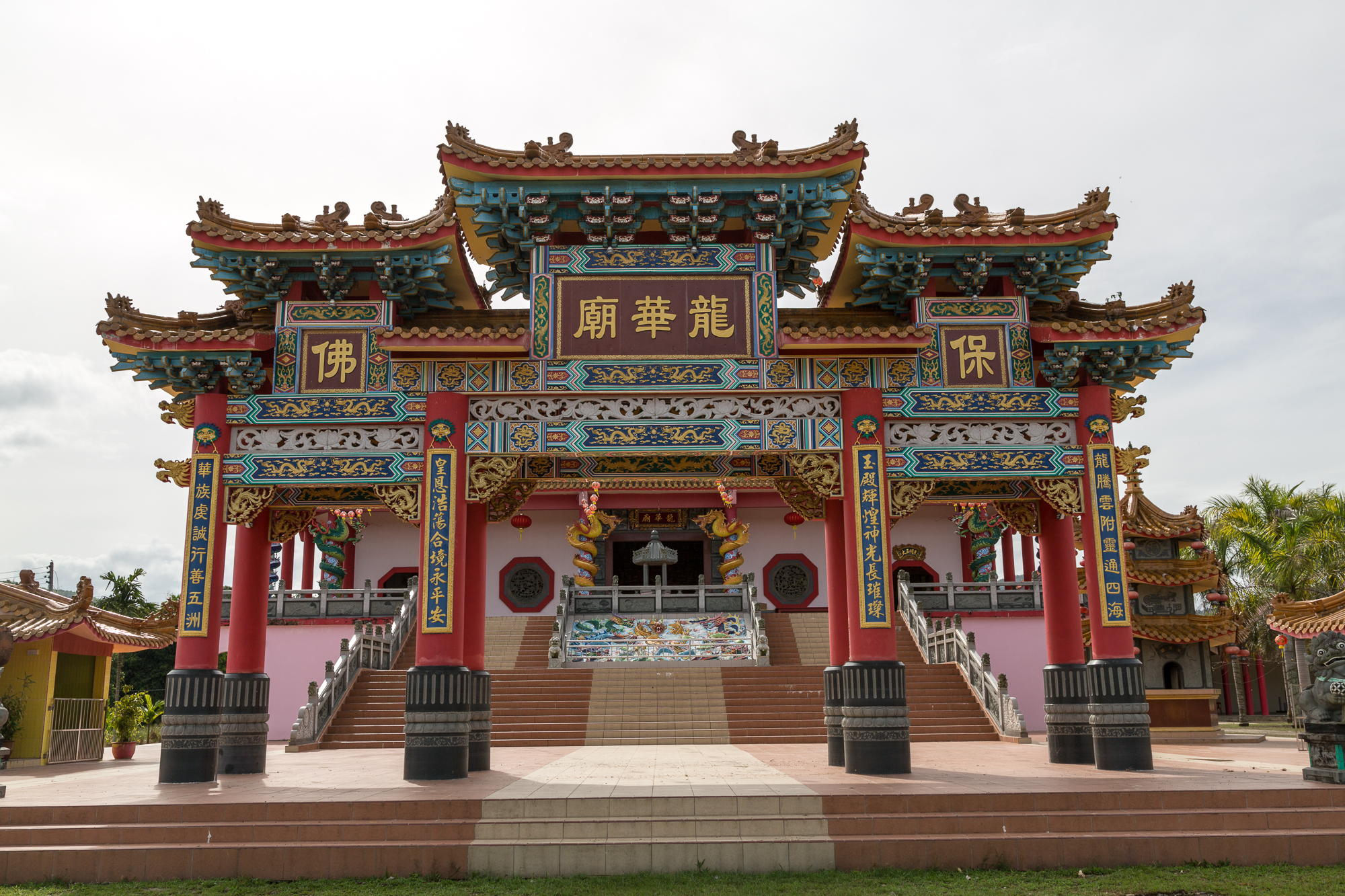
Lung Hwa Temple.

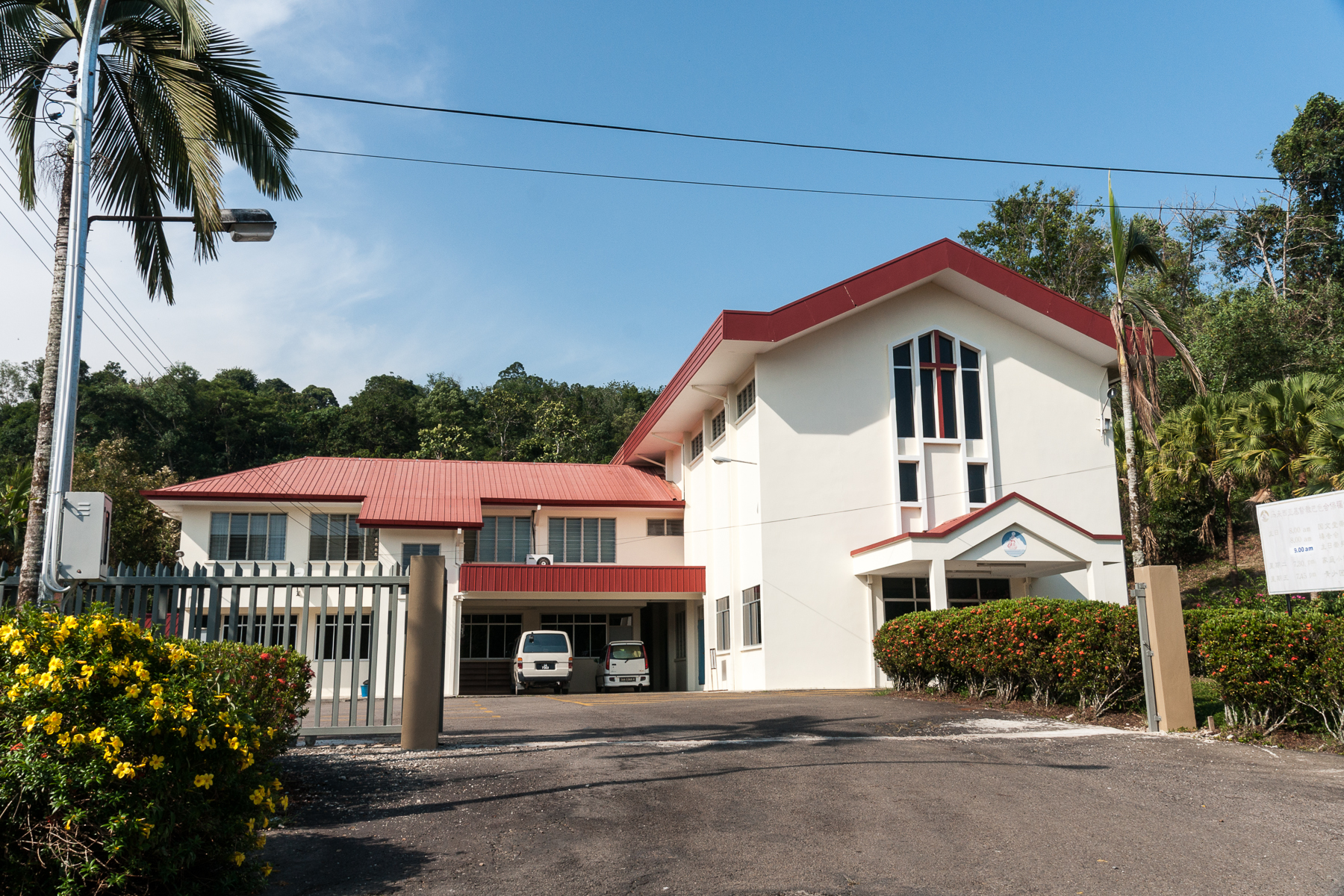
Beaufort Basel Church.

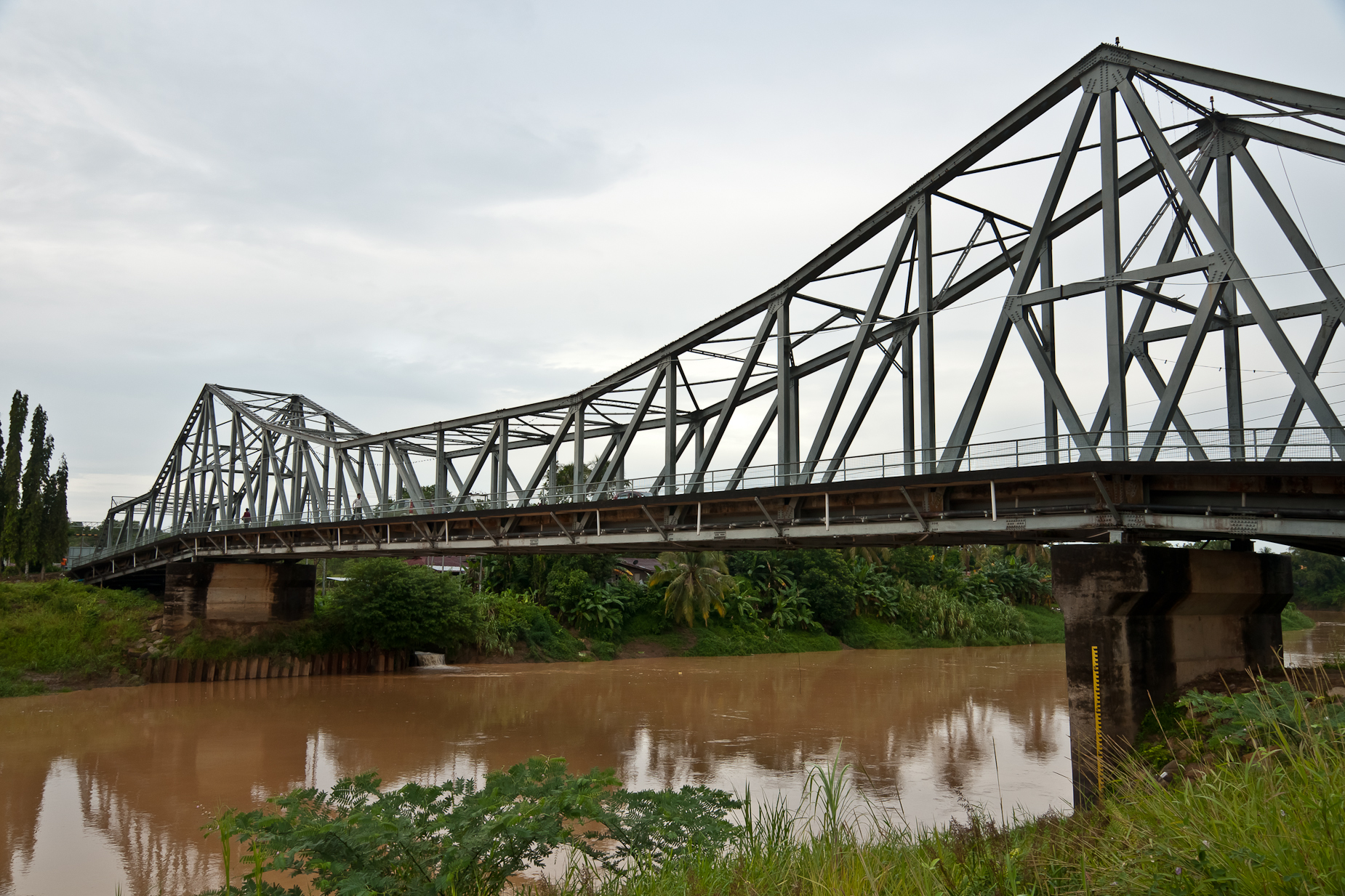
Beaufort Bridge.

== See also ==
- Districts of Malaysia
