= Babulang =

Festival of the Bisaya community of Limbang, Sarawak, Malaysia

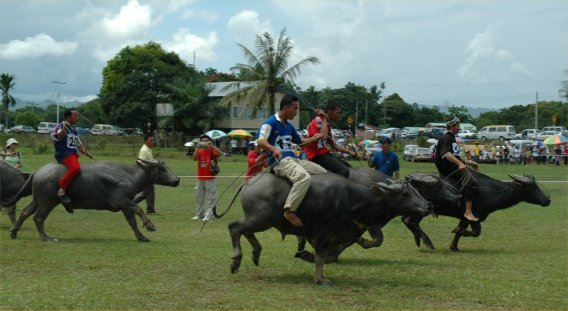
Water Buffalo racing at Babulang 2006

Pesta Babulang is the largest festival of the traditional Bisaya community of Limbang, Sarawak. The festival usually will be held on June ever year which showcases various music, songs, dances, colourful traditional costumes, decorations and handicrafts.

The festival includes a Ratu Babulang competition, and Water buffalo races.
