= Derek Headly =

British colonial administrator (1908–1998)

Derek Headly CMG OStJ

British Resident of Kelantan
- In office 1953–1957
- Preceded by: Alexander Noel Ross
- Succeeded by: George Shirley Rawlings

Personal details
- Born: 1908
- Died: 11 March 1998 (aged 89) Somerset
- Children: 2
- Education: Corpus Christi College, Cambridge
- Occupation: Colonial administrator

Derek Headly (1908 – 11 March 1998) was a British colonial administrator who was British Adviser of Kelantan from 1953 to 1957. He served with Force 136, a branch of Special Operations Executive, in Malaya during the Japanese occupation.

== Early life and education ==
Headly was born in 1908, the son of L. C. Headly of Woodhouse Eaves, Leicestershire. He was educated at Repton School and Corpus Christi College, Cambridge.

== Career ==
Headly joined the Malayan civil service in 1931. He first served with the Retrenchment Committee before he was transferred to the post of private secretary to the Chief Secretary of the Federated Malay States. In 1933 he was seconded for service in Terengganu; in 1936 he served as assistant adviser in Johore and Muar, and in 1937 was appointed to act as District Officer, Pekan. Later, he was seconded to the Palestine Mandate where he served from 1938 to 1944.

In 1944, he joined the military service. He was recruited into Force 136, a branch of Special Operations Executive in the Far East after receiving commando training from the British military in England, and was infiltrated into Japanese occupied Malaya in April 1945. Selected for his knowledge of Malaya gained while serving as a colonial officer, he along with several other agents were tasked with recruiting and training Malayans to operate as resistance fighters. He led Operation Multiple with the objective of establishing a guerrilla base in Lower Pahang and Negeri Sembilan but was hindered by the Chinese MPAJA who opposed the establishment of an organised resistance movement by the Malay population while seeking to control resistance against the Japanese themselves. As a result, Headly failed to establish a base in the designated area and was able to recruit only a handful of Malay guerrillas. He rose to the rank of lieutenant colonel; was mentioned in dispatches, and wrote a book about his experiences.

After the war, he was attached to the British Military Administration in Malaya. From 1949 to 1953, he was British Resident of North Borneo, and from 1953 to 1957 served as British Adviser, in Kelantan.

After retiring from the Malayan civil service in 1957, he joined the family firm of Vipan & Headly Ltd in Leicester, which manufactured dairy equipment, metalware and utensils, serving as a director until the firm closed in 1964. From 1966 to 1977, he was Midlands Secretary of the Independent Schools Careers Organisation.

== Personal life and death ==
Headly married Joyce Freeman in 1946 and they had a son and a daughter. Headly was appointed officer the Order of St John (OStJ). During the 1930s, he served as an officer in the Federated Malay States Volunteer Force.

Hedley died on 11 March 1998 in Somerset, aged 89.

== Honours ==
Hedley was appointed Companion of the Order of St Michael and St George (CMG) in the 1957 Birthday Honours.
