= Beaufort Bridge =

Bridge in Sabah, Malaysia

The Beaufort Bridge is a landmark bridge across Padas River in Beaufort District, Sabah, Malaysia. It is maintained by Sabah Public Works Department. It is a truss girder bridge.
