= Early 2014 Sabah floods =

Natural disaster in Malaysia

- Date: 13 January – 18 February 2014
- Location: Interior Division and several other areas
- Deaths: 2 confirmed dead
- Property damage: Millions of ringgit

High intensity rainfall since 13 January 2014 caused major flooding across the Interior Division of Sabah including some towns in other divisions such as Kota Kinabalu (Menggatal area), Penampang and Tuaran. Another follow-up heavy rainfall events caused repeated flash flooding in the interior areas in early February.

== Affected areas ==
The floods affected three districts in the Interior Division such as Beaufort, Keningau and Tenom. As of 15 February, more than 4,000 people had been evacuated to 22 relief centres in Beaufort and Tenom. Continuous rain in Beaufort has worrying officials despite water levels dropping slightly in some parts of the district.

== Responses ==
Minister in the Prime Minister's Department, Shahidan Kassim and Chief Secretary to the Government, Dr. Ali Hamsa have flown to Beaufort to assess the flood situation there. Relevant authorities such as the Royal Malaysia Police, Royal Malaysian Air Force and Sabah Air has been directed by the Chief Minister of Sabah, Musa Aman to help deliver food and basic necessities to areas that cannot be accessible by road. The state government of Sabah has proposed to create more reservoirs, rain harvesting and tidal gates at river mouths to resolve floods problem that affecting several districts in the state. Sabah Deputy Chief Minister, Yahya Hussin also inspected the situation at the flood-hit agricultural areas in the district and delivered around 200 sacks of rice and 300 packs of food supplies contributed by Bernas and Rural Development Corporation (KPD) for distribution by the district council to the flood victims. The Minister of Rural and Regional Development, Shafie Apdal said his ministry is more than ready to help repair flood damaged houses in Beaufort and Tenom respectively after assessing the losses while agencies like the National Security Council will help provide food supplies to the victims. While Sabah Football Association (Safa) in collaboration with the supporters clubs, Juara Futsal centre and Suria FM organised a programme to help flood victims.
