= Sipitang =

- Town and district capital
- Pekan Sipitang; Sipitang Town

Other transcription(s)
  - Jawi: سيڤيتاڠ
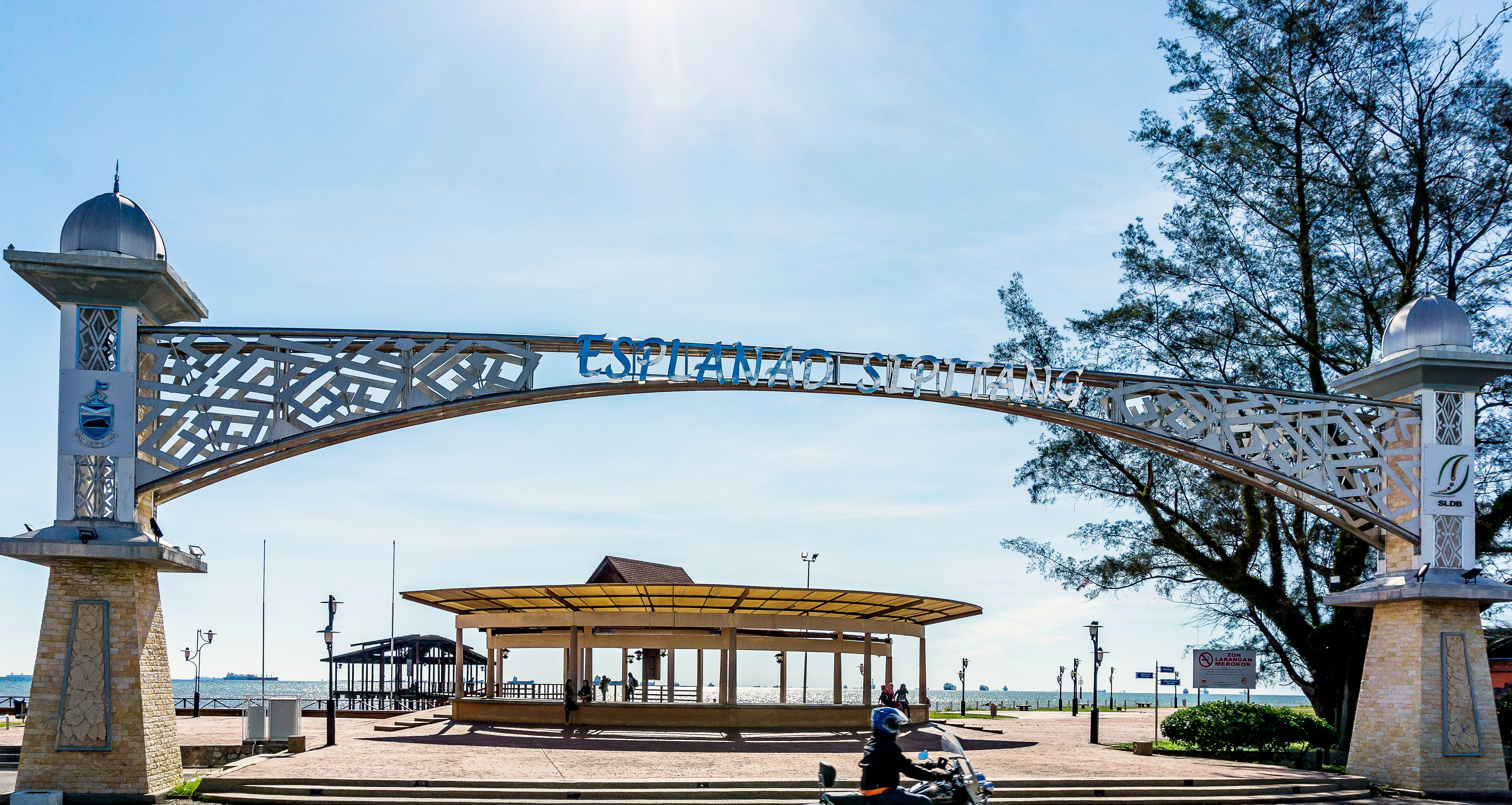
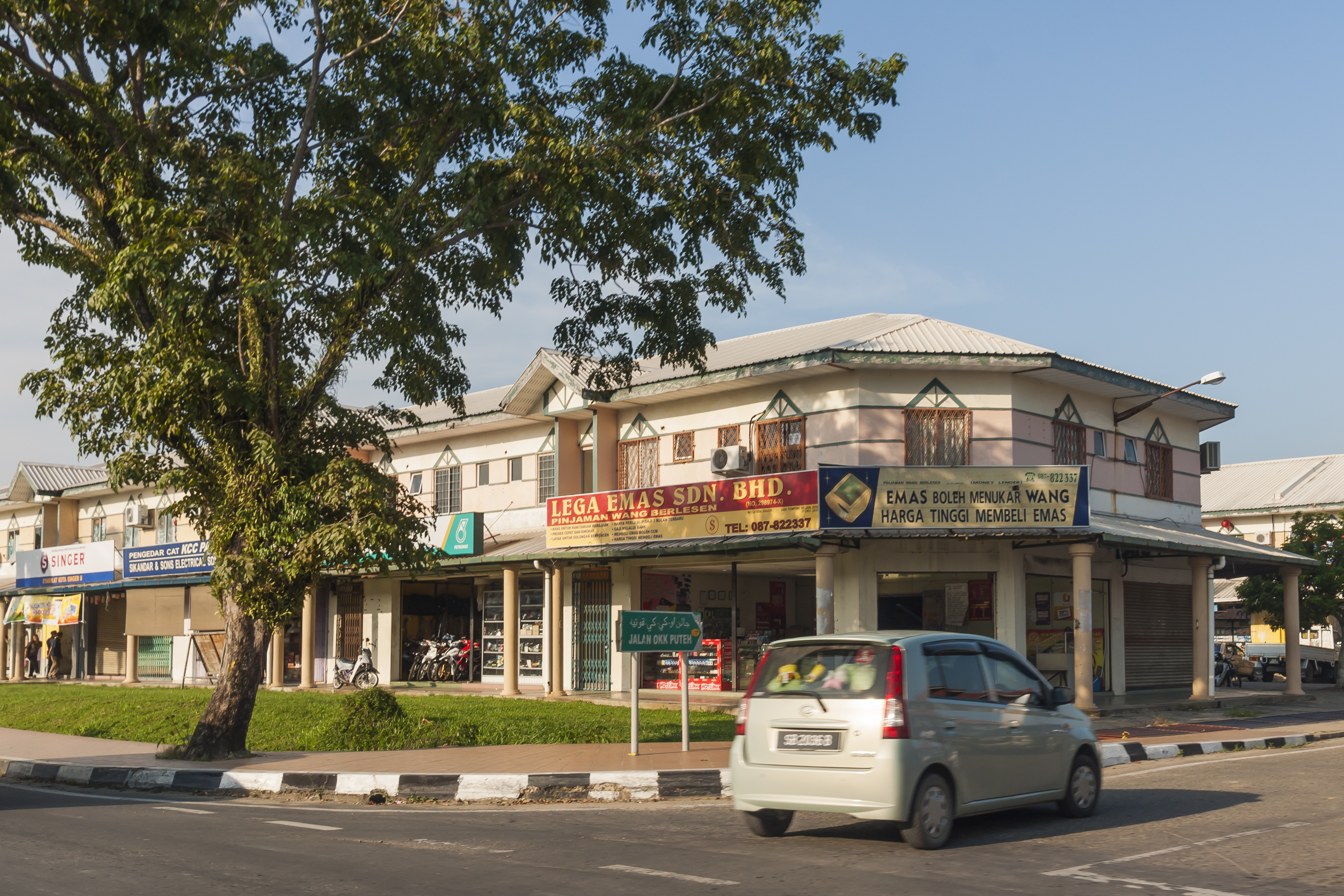
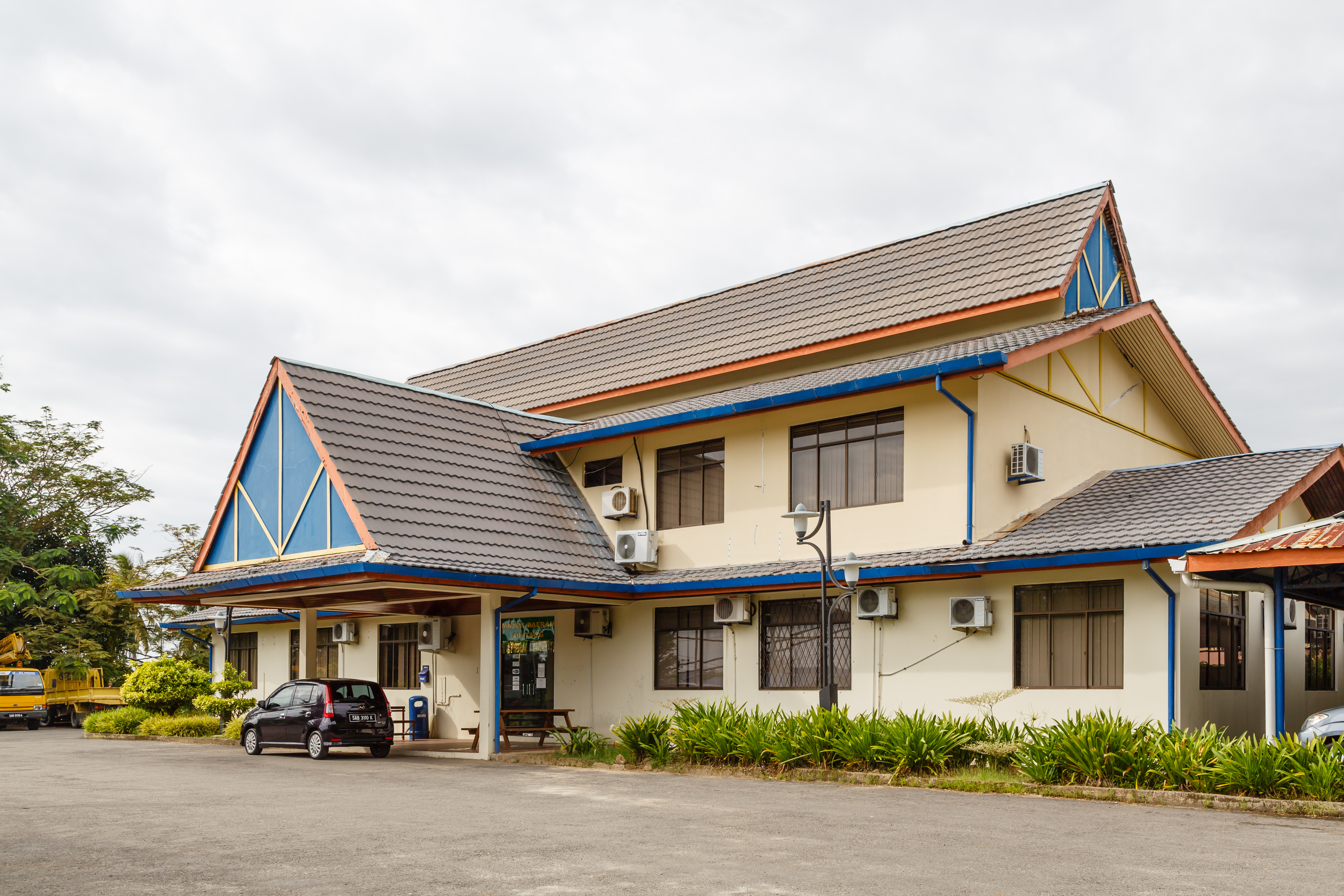
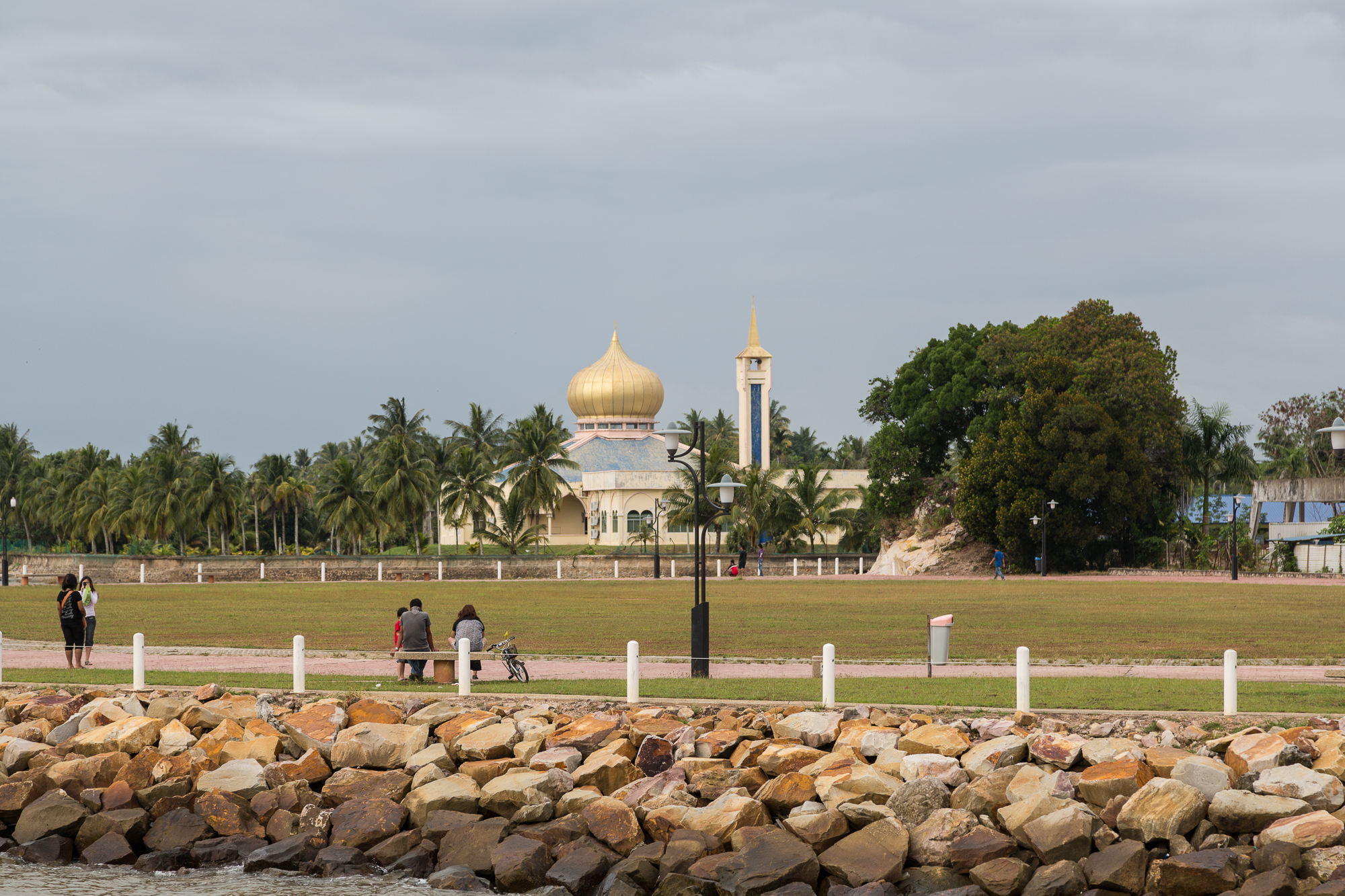
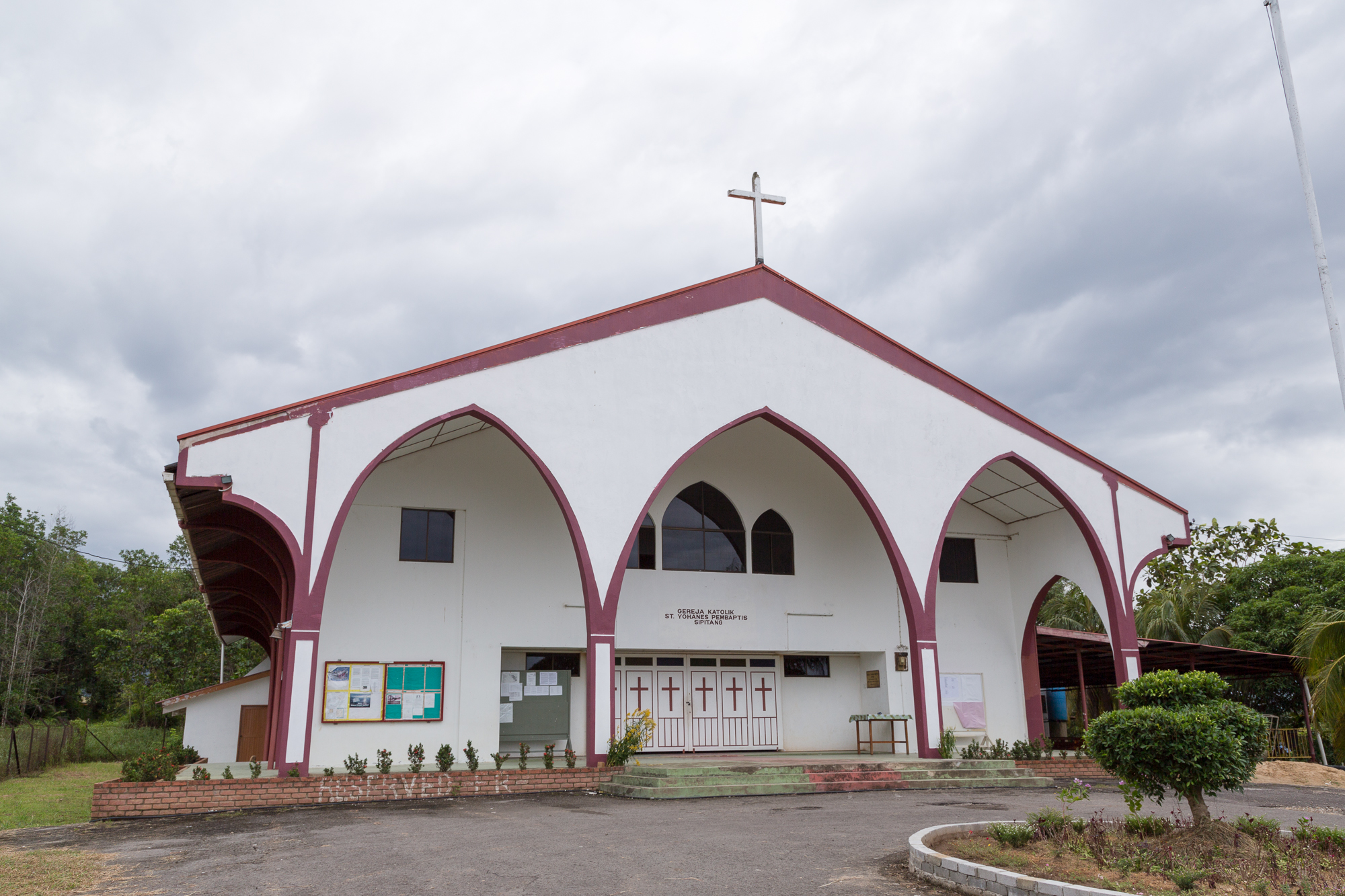
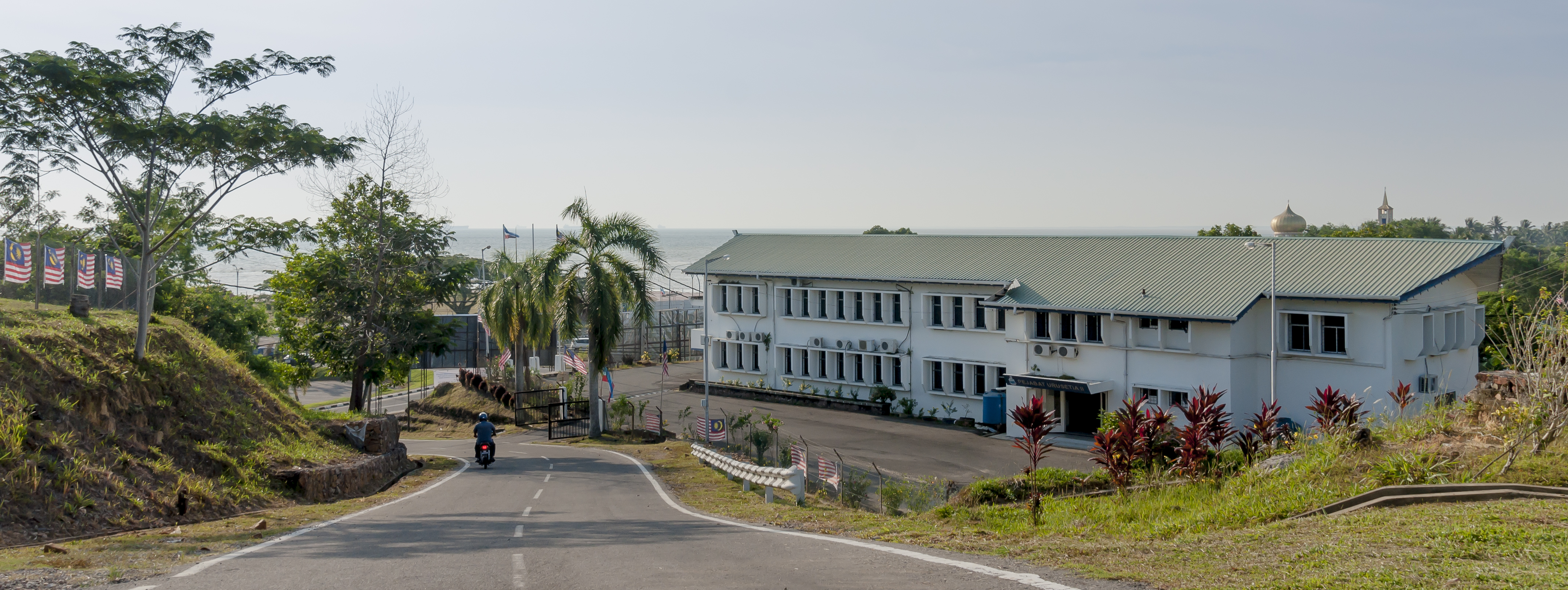
- From top, left to right: Esplanade Sipitang, the Shophouse in Downtown, the District Council Building, the City Mosque, the St. John Baptist Church, and the District Office

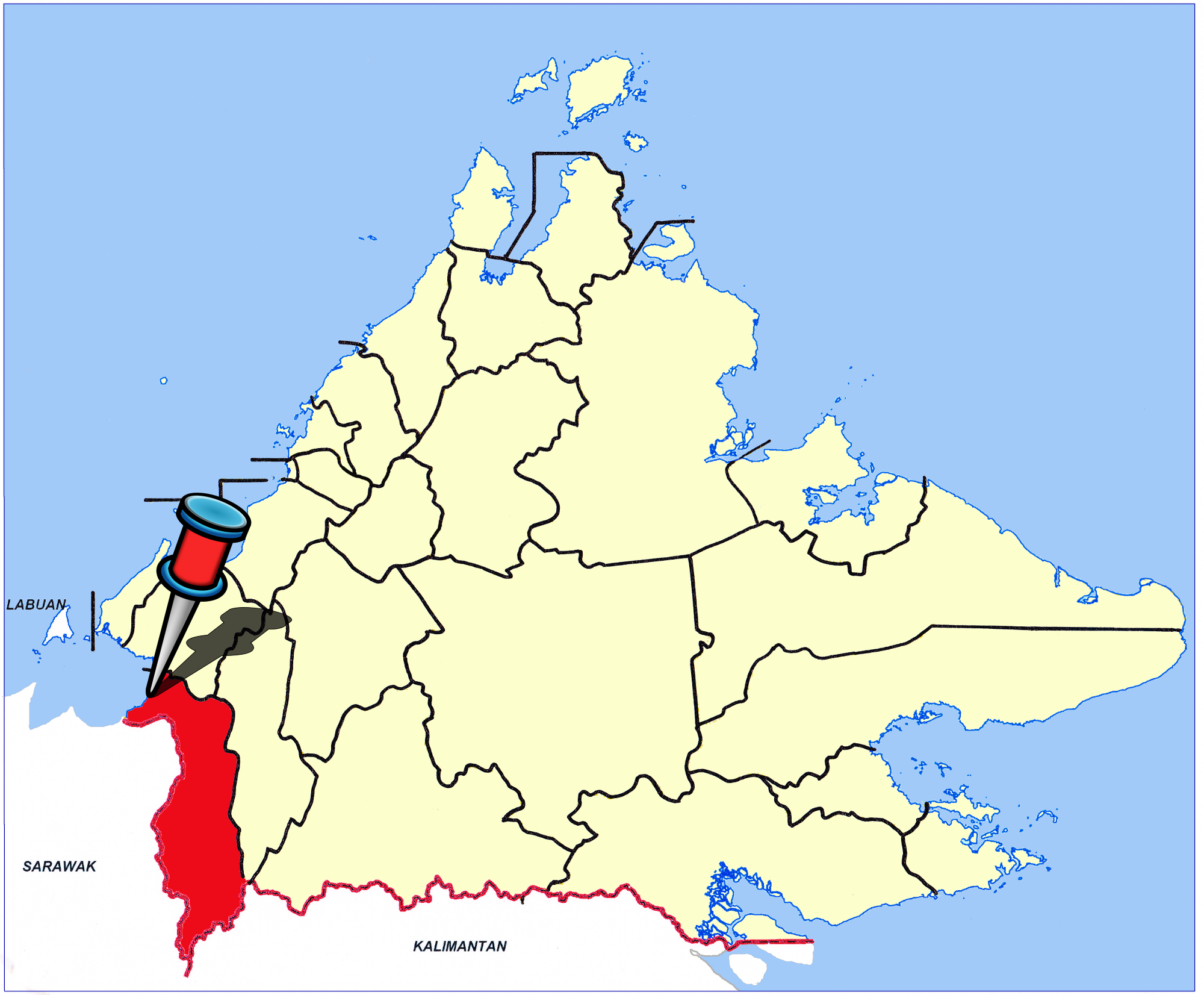
- Coordinates: 5°5′N 115°33′E
- Country: Malaysia
- State: Sabah
- Division: Interior
- District: Sipitang

Population (2010)
  - Total: 4,298

Sipitang (Malay: Pekan Sipitang) is the capital of the Sipitang District in the Interior Division of Sabah, Malaysia. Its population was estimated to be around 4,298 in 2010. It is the closest town in Sabah to the Sarawak border, and is 44 kilometres south of Beaufort and 144 kilometres south of Kota Kinabalu, the state capital and also is 123 kilometres north of Long Pasia, one of the famous attraction in Sabah.

== Economy ==
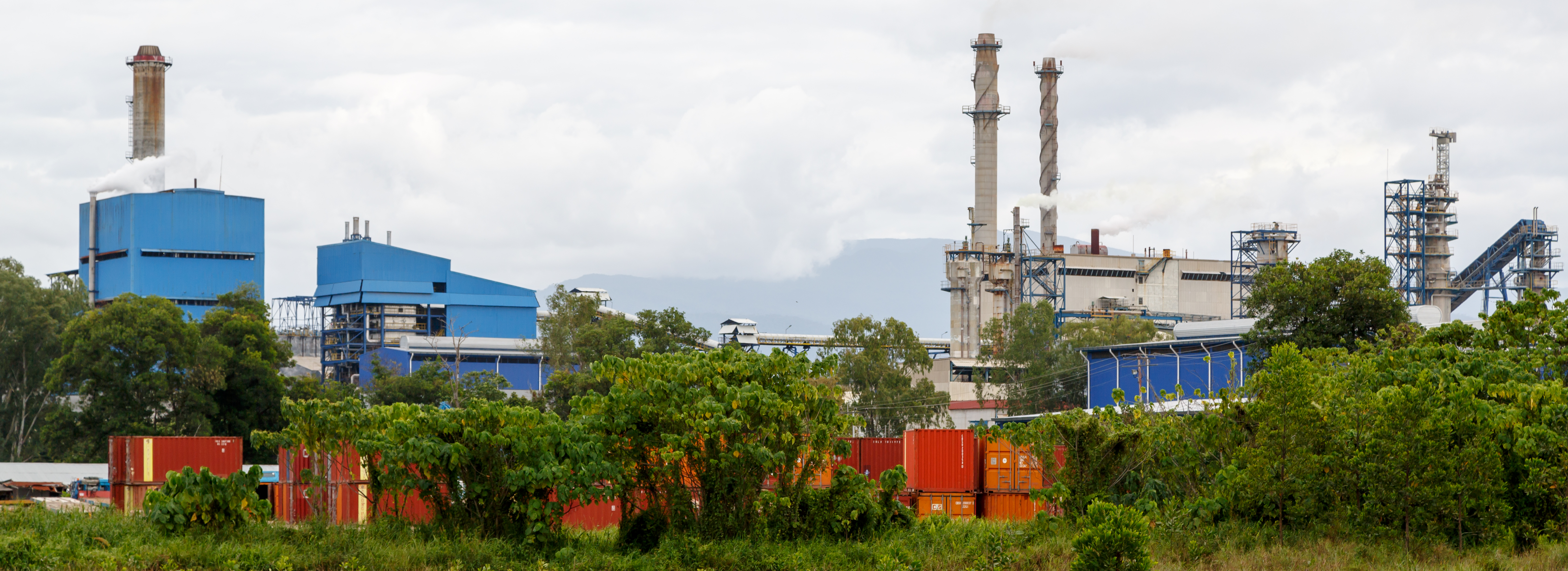
Sabah Forest Industry factory

The major economic activities in Sipitang are timber related. A pulp and paper mill plant was constructed in 1987 and is operated by Sabah Forest Industries, currently a subsidiary of Indian company, Ballarpur Industries Limited. Generally, these activities does not directly benefit the locals. Most of the locals are involved in subsistence farming and fishing.

The town is set to become one of Sabah's oil and gas industry centre following the state government's decision to build an oil and gas industrial park in Sipitang and the national oil company - Petronas's decision to build Sabah ammonia and urea plant in this town. The urea plant is planned to double Petronas's current total production capacity of urea to 2.6 million tonnes per annum (mtpa), while the ammonia plant will produce 740,000 million metric tons per annum.

== Culture and leisure ==
Sipitang town hosts the biennial GATA (Gasing and Tamu Besar) festival since 2003. This festival features cultural events such as traditional games, music and dance performances, mainly of the predominant indigenous group in Sipitang district, that is the Kedayan, Lundayeh/Lun Bawang, Murut and Brunei Malay.

A 10 million project for the construction of an esplanade and a welcoming arch in Sipitang district was launched in 2007. The esplanade and arch was completed in 2011. The villages of Long Pasia and Long Mio and their surrounding conservation area are located in Sipitang district. The Long Pasia area is one of the popular tourist destination in Sabah, which places among others, the Maga waterfall and Kerangas park.

== Other utilities ==
=== Healthcare ===
The first medical facility in Sipitang is a dispensary, established in the 1970s. This site was originally a rest house during the British colonial days. It provided limited medical services, among others are external patient service, maternal and infant care clinic, and tuberculosis and malaria control centre. The current Sipitang Hospital is located off Sipitang-Mesapol road. It officially commenced operations on 10 April 1995.

=== Education ===
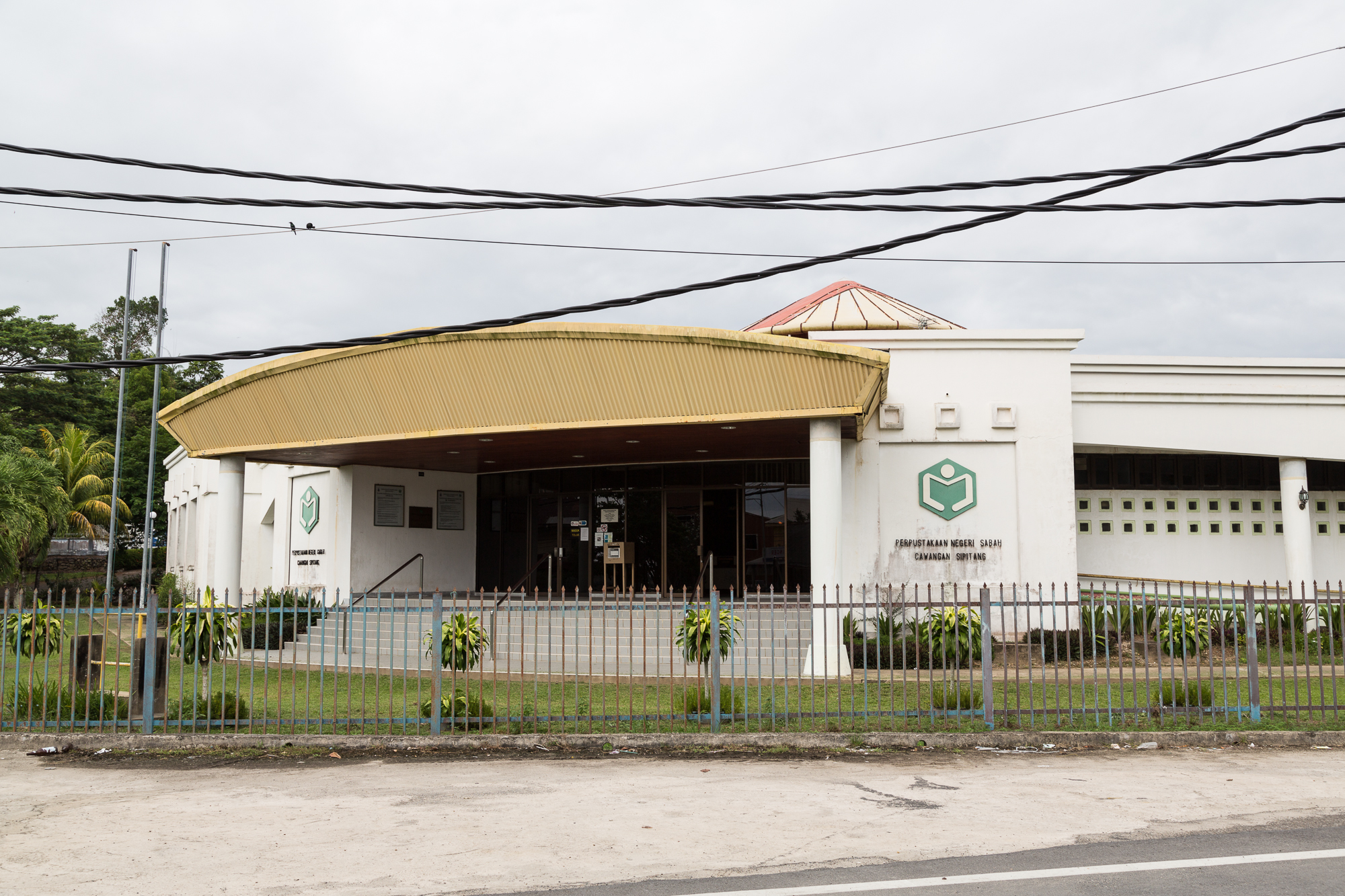
Sipitang Library.

As of 2017, there are 4 secondary schools in Sipitang; SMK Pengiran Omar, SMK Pengiran Omar II, SMK Padang Berampah and SMK Sindumin. These schools are all located in the vicinity of Sipitang town.

Libraries:

Sipitang branch library is located in Sipitang town. The library is operated by the Sabah State Library department. Other libraries or private libraries can be found in secondary and primary schools in Sipitang.

== Climate ==
Sipitang has a tropical rainforest climate (Af) with heavy to very heavy rainfall year-round.

Climate data for Sipitang
Month	Jan	Feb	Mar	Apr	May	Jun	Jul	Aug	Sep	Oct	Nov	Dec	Year
Mean daily maximum °C (°F)	30.0 (86.0)	30.0 (86.0)	30.9 (87.6)	31.6 (88.9)	31.6 (88.9)	31.4 (88.5)	31.1 (88.0)	31.0 (87.8)	31.0 (87.8)	30.8 (87.4)	30.5 (86.9)	30.4 (86.7)	30.9 (87.5)
Daily mean °C (°F)	27.1 (80.8)	27.1 (80.8)	27.7 (81.9)	28.2 (82.8)	28.3 (82.9)	28.0 (82.4)	27.7 (81.9)	27.6 (81.7)	27.6 (81.7)	27.5 (81.5)	27.4 (81.3)	27.3 (81.1)	27.6 (81.7)
Mean daily minimum °C (°F)	24.2 (75.6)	24.2 (75.6)	24.5 (76.1)	24.8 (76.6)	25.0 (77.0)	24.7 (76.5)	24.4 (75.9)	24.3 (75.7)	24.2 (75.6)	24.2 (75.6)	24.3 (75.7)	24.3 (75.7)	24.4 (76.0)
Average rainfall mm (inches)	279 (11.0)	176 (6.9)	222 (8.7)	268 (10.6)	334 (13.1)	260 (10.2)	276 (10.9)	308 (12.1)	354 (13.9)	382 (15.0)	394 (15.5)	331 (13.0)	3,584 (140.9)
Source: Climate-Data.org
