= Sindumin =

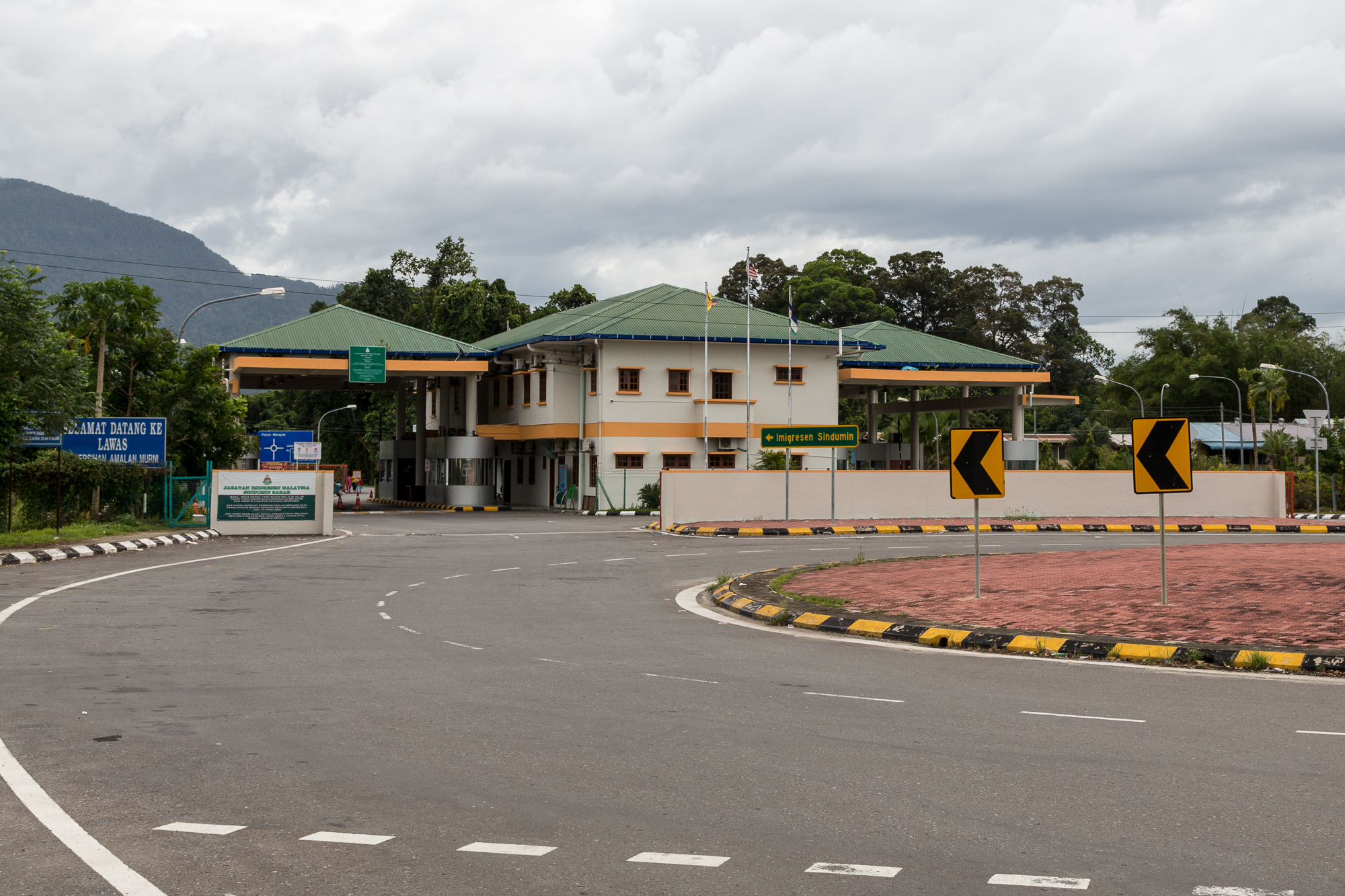
- An immigration checkpoint in Sindumin.
- Interactive map of Sindumin
- Coordinates: 4°58′N 115°30′E
- Country: Malaysia
- State: Sabah
- Division: Interior
- District: Sipitang
- Elevation: 15 m (49 ft)
- Highest elevation: 100 m (330 ft)

Sindumin is a town and sub-district, in the Sipitang District of Sabah, Malaysia. It was formerly known as Mengalong until the mid-20th century. It is situated on the Sabah-Sarawak border in the Interior Division of Sabah along the Mengalong river, and is also one of the towns within the Brunei Bay. Many residents here are of Kedayan, Murut and the Lundayeh/Lun Bawang descent. The town opposite Sindumin in Sarawak is Merapok, part of the Lawas District in Limbang Division. The immigration and Customs Checkpoint was open until midnight.
