= Sipitang District =

Sipitang District Daerah Sipitang
- District
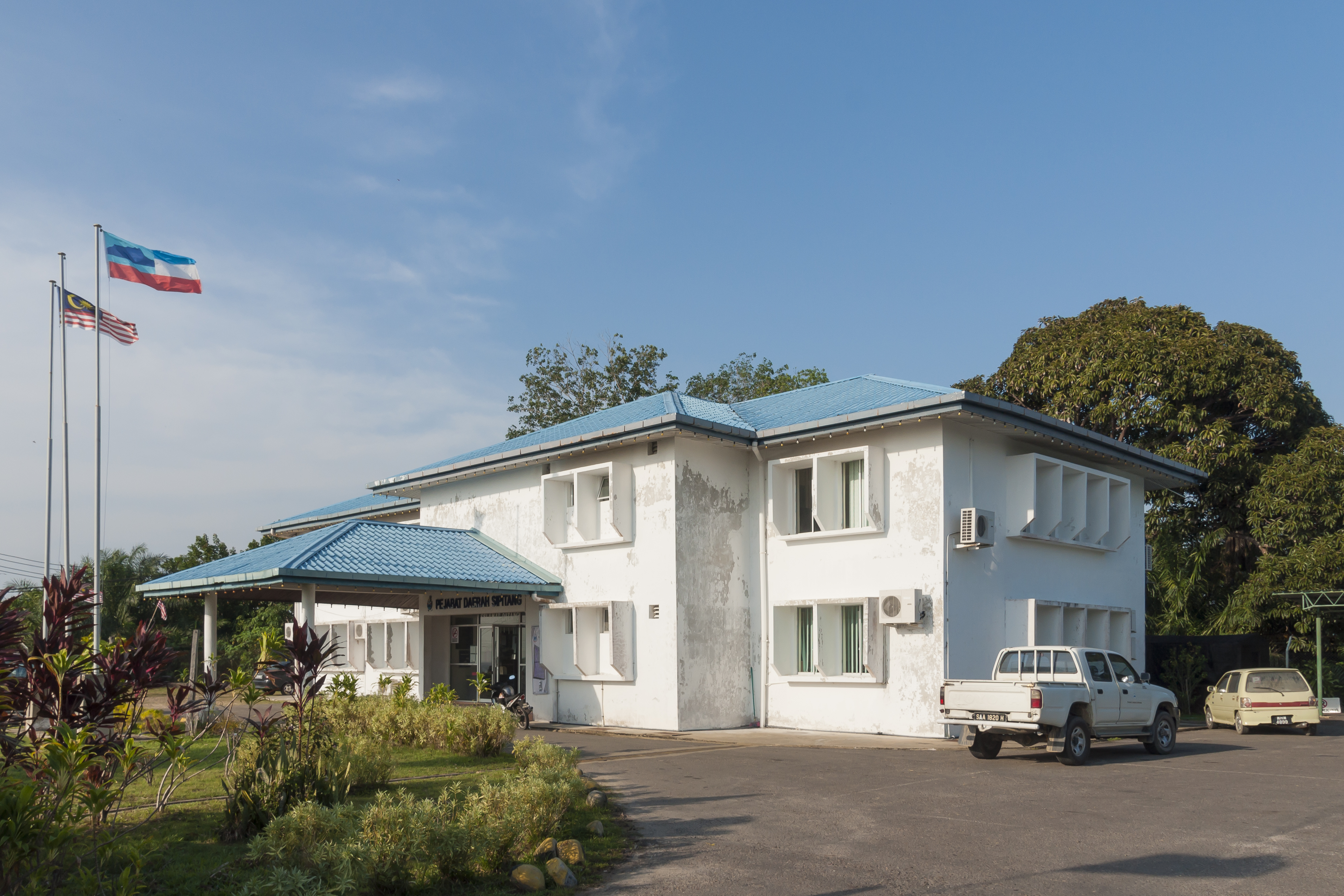
- Sipitang District office.

- Seal

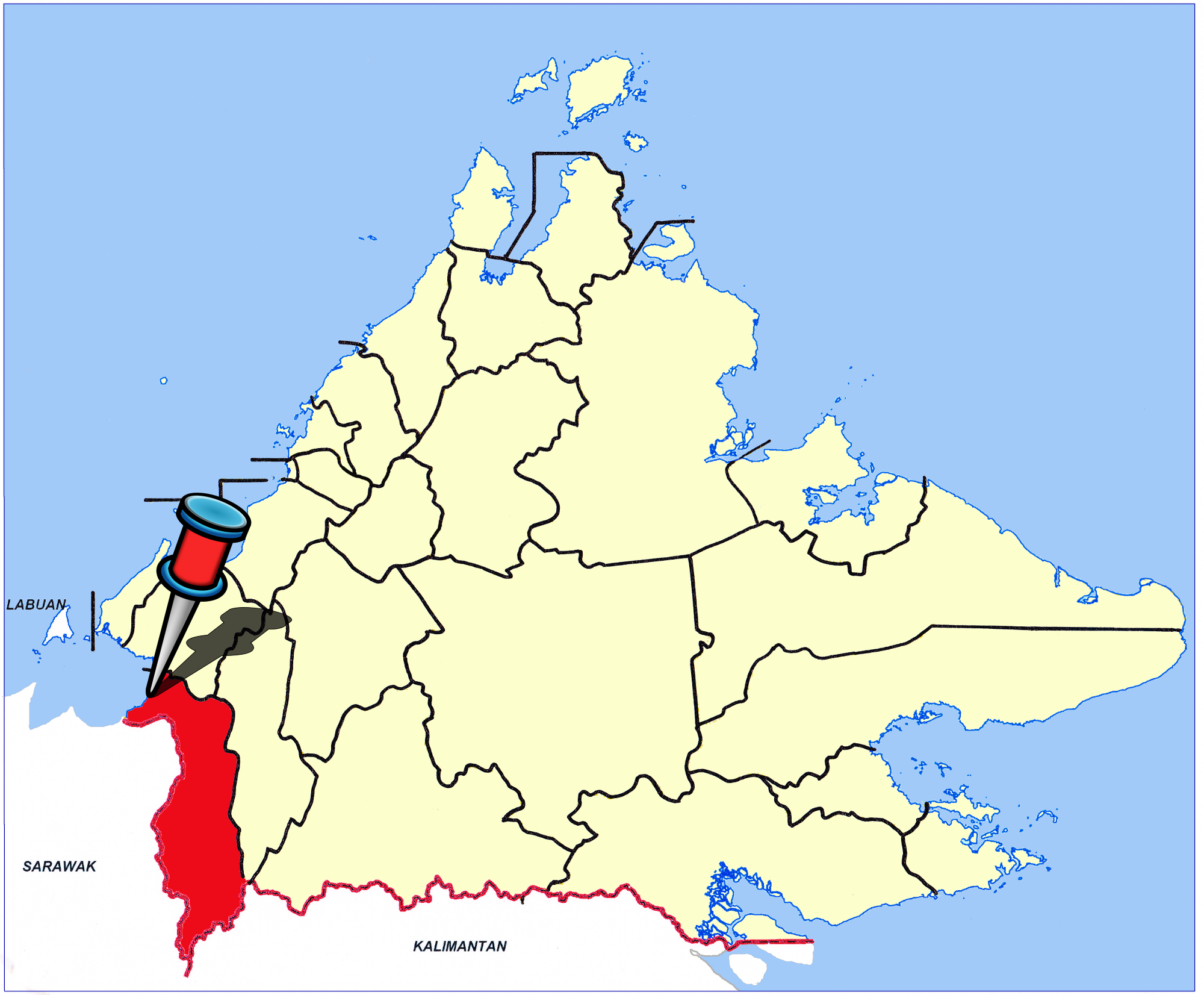
- Coordinates: 5°5′N 115°33′E
- Country: Malaysia
- State: Sabah
- Division: Interior
- Capital: Sipitang

Government
  - District Officer: Pengiran Raimy Awangku Abdul Rahman

Area
  - Total: 2,732.5 km^{2} (1,055.0 sq mi)

Population (2010)
  - Total: 34,862
- Website: mdsipitang.sbh.gov.my pdsipitang.sbh.gov.my

Map of Sipitang District

The Sipitang District (Malay: Daerah Sipitang) is an administrative district in the Malaysian state of Sabah, part of the Interior Division which also includes the districts of Beaufort, Keningau, Kuala Penyu, Nabawan, Tambunan and Tenom. The capital of the district is in Sipitang Town. The ecotourism village of Long Mio and Long Pasia is located in this district, while the small town of Sindumin serves as a gateway to the state of Sarawak.

== History ==
Prior to 1884, Sipitang was part of Brunei. On 5 November 1884, the Sultan of Brunei ceded the territory from Sipitang towards Kuala Penyu to the British North Borneo Chartered Company (NBCC) following a bribe from William Hood Treacher, the inaugural Governor of North Borneo. On 7 December 1901, the company expand the area around the territory from Sipitang River to Trusan River. In addition, on 12 September 1901, the NBCC acquired the Mengalong and Merantaman area, which today is also within the district of Sipitang through a grant from Pengiran Tengah Damit ibni al-Marhum Pengiran Anak Bongsu, who is the hereditary ruler of the territory. Until the year 1900, the Sipitang River marked the border between North Borneo and Brunei.

The land acquisition between the river and Trusan River in 1901 resulted in the establishment of an administrative office in Sipitang called Province Clarke (named after Andrew Clarke). The main purpose of this administrative post was primarily due to the planned acquisition of additional territories. However, several problems led to the return of some lands, so that the demarcation line to Sarawak was finally placed on the still valid border line at Mengalong. When the Brunei Revolt broke out in Brunei on 8 December 1962, the rebellion spread rapidly across the border into Limbang, Lawas and Miri in Sarawak and Weston until Sipitang in northern Borneo, especially when these places were traditionally linked to the Sultanate of Brunei. With the intervention of the North Borneo Governor William Goode, many rebels in Sipitang and Weston were isolated and disarmed within several days. Another 73 rebels were arrested with a smaller amount of weapons confiscated.

== Geography ==
Sipitang district is located at the southwest portion of the state of Sabah. It is located between latitude 5°5' North and between longitude 115°33’ East. It spans an area of approximately 273,249.69 hectare.

Sipitang district is located within a national and international route. Southern Sabah Federal Route 1 of the Pan Borneo Highway passes through this district, hence it can be reached from Beaufort from the north, Tenom from the east and Lawas, Sarawak from southwest. At the same time, the coastline stretches 16 kilometre off Brunei Bay and is an entry point for travellers from Brunei and Labuan. The district has a long coastline and has 4 main rivers flowing through it, that is the Lukutan river, Sipitang river, Mengalong river and Padas river. The Crocker Range can also be seen from this district as it crosses the district from south to southwest. The presence of small hills and flat lands near the coastal area is one of the main reasons for the frequent floods in Sipitang during the monsoon season. This topography has also influenced the temperature and rainfall distribution of the district. At lower lands less than 1,524 metres, the temperature is around 28 °C – 34 °C, while the rainfall distribution in the lowlands is much lower than the highlands. The highest part of the district is Mount Lumaku, which is located in the southern end of Crocker Range and northern part of Meligan Range.

== Demographics ==
According to the last census in 2010, the population of the district of Sipitang is 34,862 inhabitants, while 2020 census shows that the population has grown to 37,828 inhabitant, showing a 0.8% average annual growth rate for that decade.

As the census only categorizes 6 major ethnics while others are lumped under Other Bumiputras and Others, majority of the inhabitants are of other Bumiputras not listed in the main categories.

Ethnicity of Sipitang	Population (2000 census)	Population (2010 census)	Population (2020 census)
Other Bumiputeras	11,037	13,419	11,793
Malay	4,605	5,534	10,762
Murut	4,087	4,709	5,570
Kadazan Dusun	3,225	3,874	2,891
Bajau	827	942	1,935
Total Bumiputera	23,781	28,478	33,266
Chinese	1,054	1,225	569
India	-	57	44
Others	1,282	1,384	165
Total Malaysian Citizen	26,117	31,144	33,729
Non-Malaysian Citizen	3,139	3,718	4,099
Total	29,256	34,842	37,828

A local census estimates that the population comprises 60% Kedayan, 30% Murut, Lun Bawang and Lundayeh, 10% Bruneian Malay as well as Chinese. The population is divided among the larger communities and the total area of the district as follows:

Ethnics group in Sipitang District
Ethnic	Percent
Kedayan	60%
Lun Bawang/ Lundayeh/ Murut	30%
Bruneian Malay and Chinese	10%

Sipitang District	34,862 inhabitants
Long Pasia	1000
Malaman	32
Mesapol	888
Sindumin	115
Sipitang	4,298
Remaining areas	29,529

== Notable people ==
=== Statesmen ===
- Tun Datuk Seri Panglima Pengiran Ahmad Raffae - The second Head of State of Sabah

=== Politicians ===
- Datuk Sapawi Ahmad - politician
- Datuk Dr. Haji Yusof Yacob - the former Deputy Speaker of the Dewan Rakyat and incumbent assemblyman for Sindumin

=== Sportsmen ===
- Ronny Harun - Malaysian football player
- Mafry Balang - Malaysian football player
- Randy Baruh - Malaysian football player
- Robson Rendy Rining - Malaysian football player

== Gallery ==
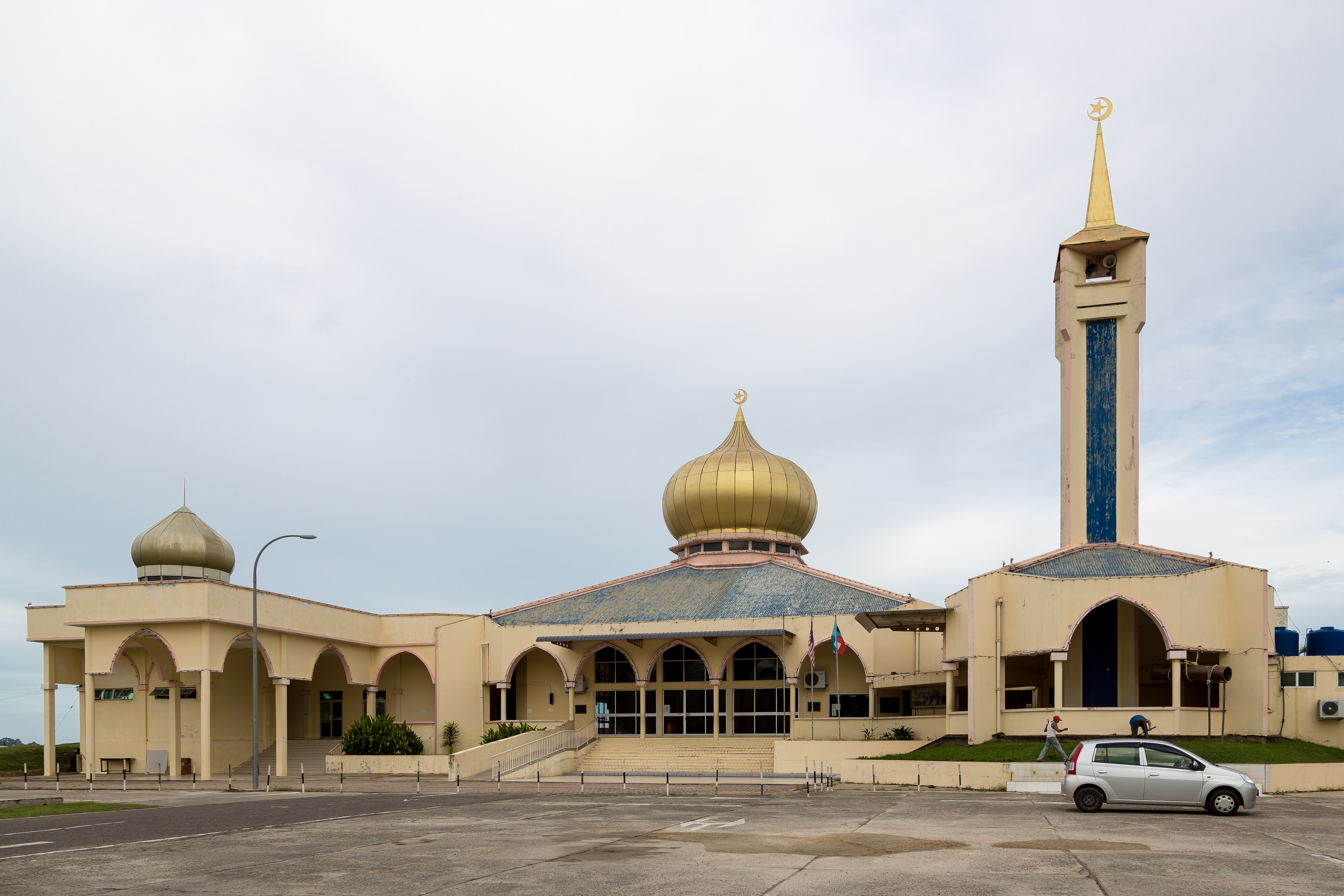
Haji Hassim Mosque.

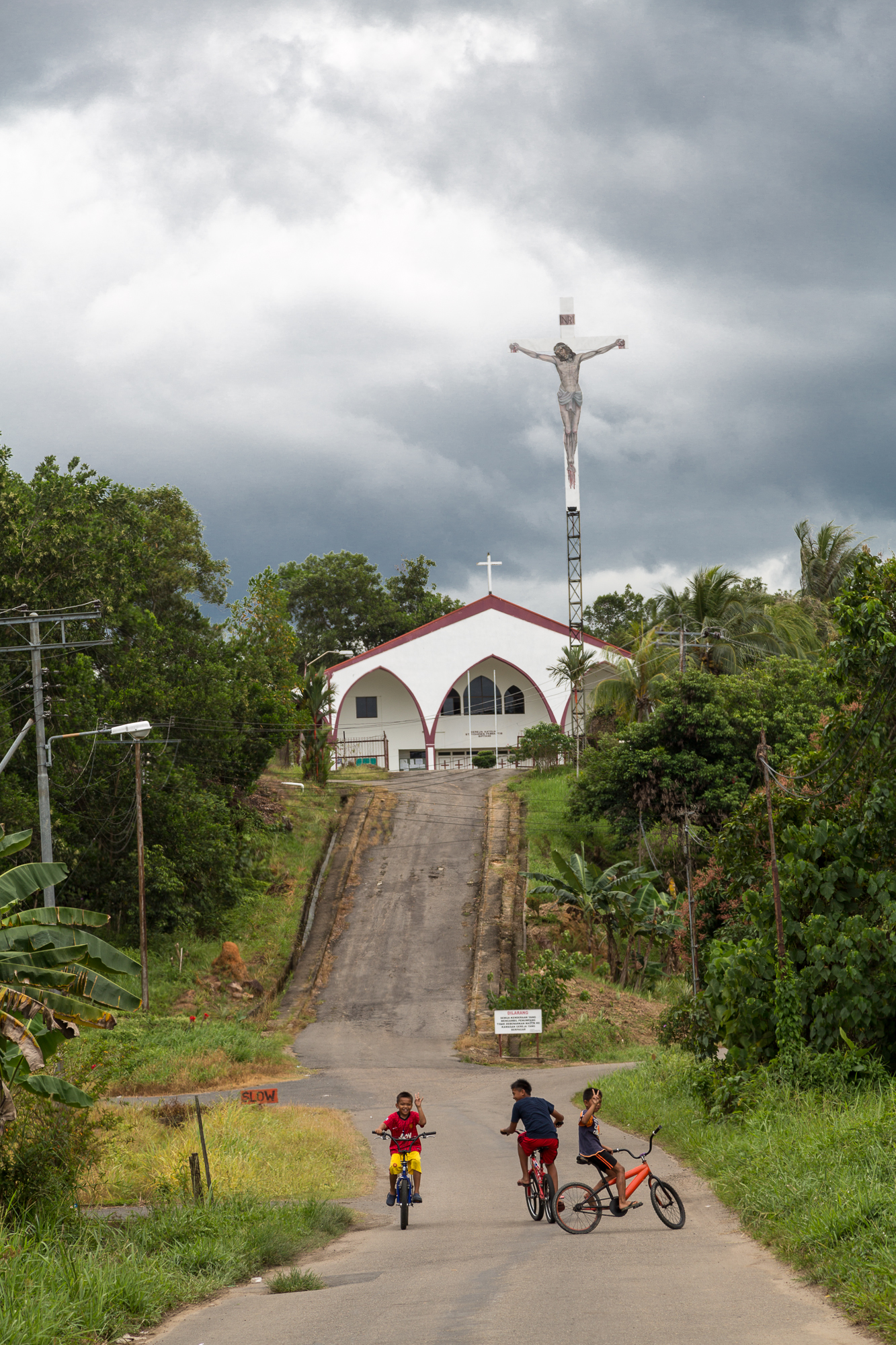
St. John the Baptist Catholic Church.

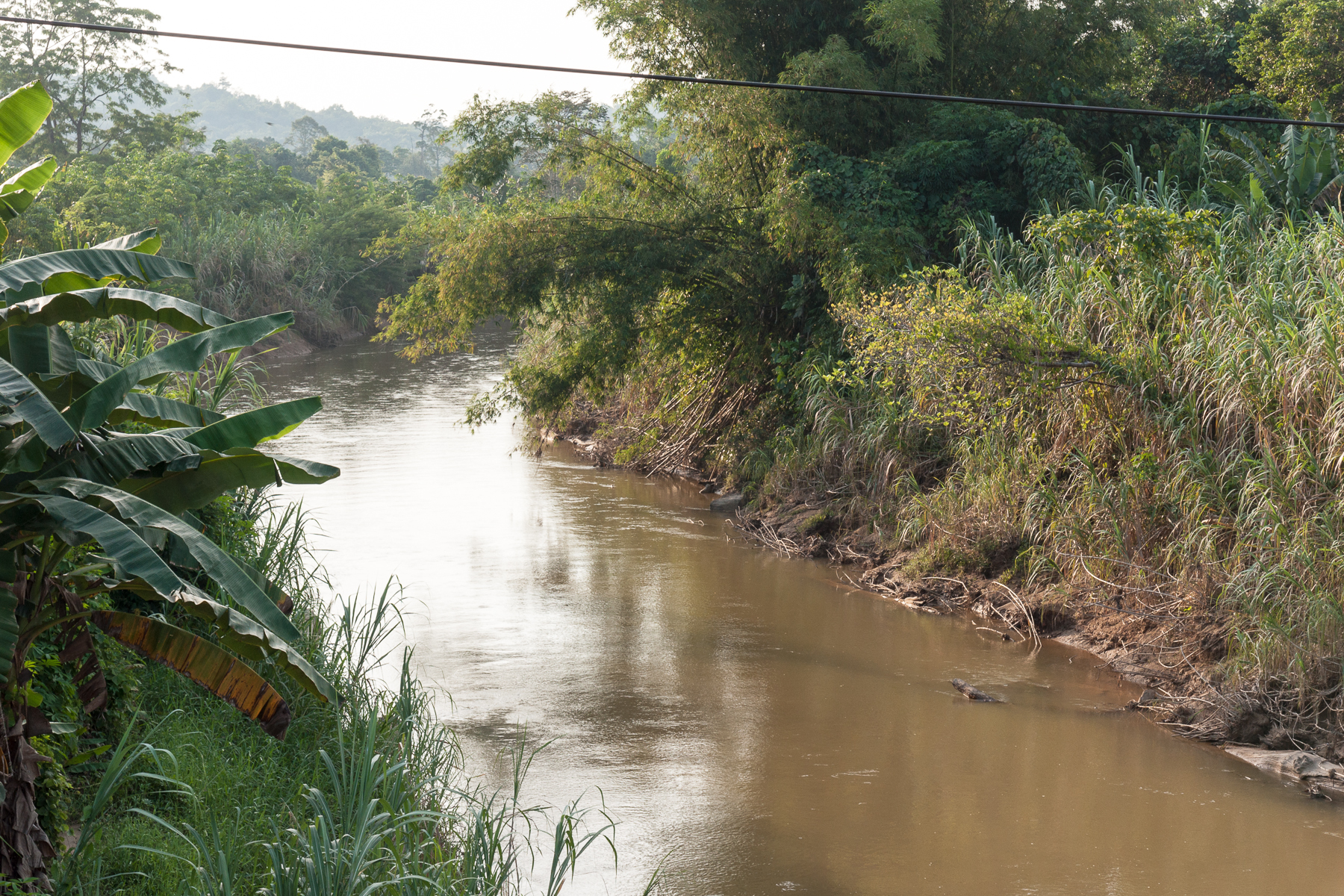
Lukutan River.

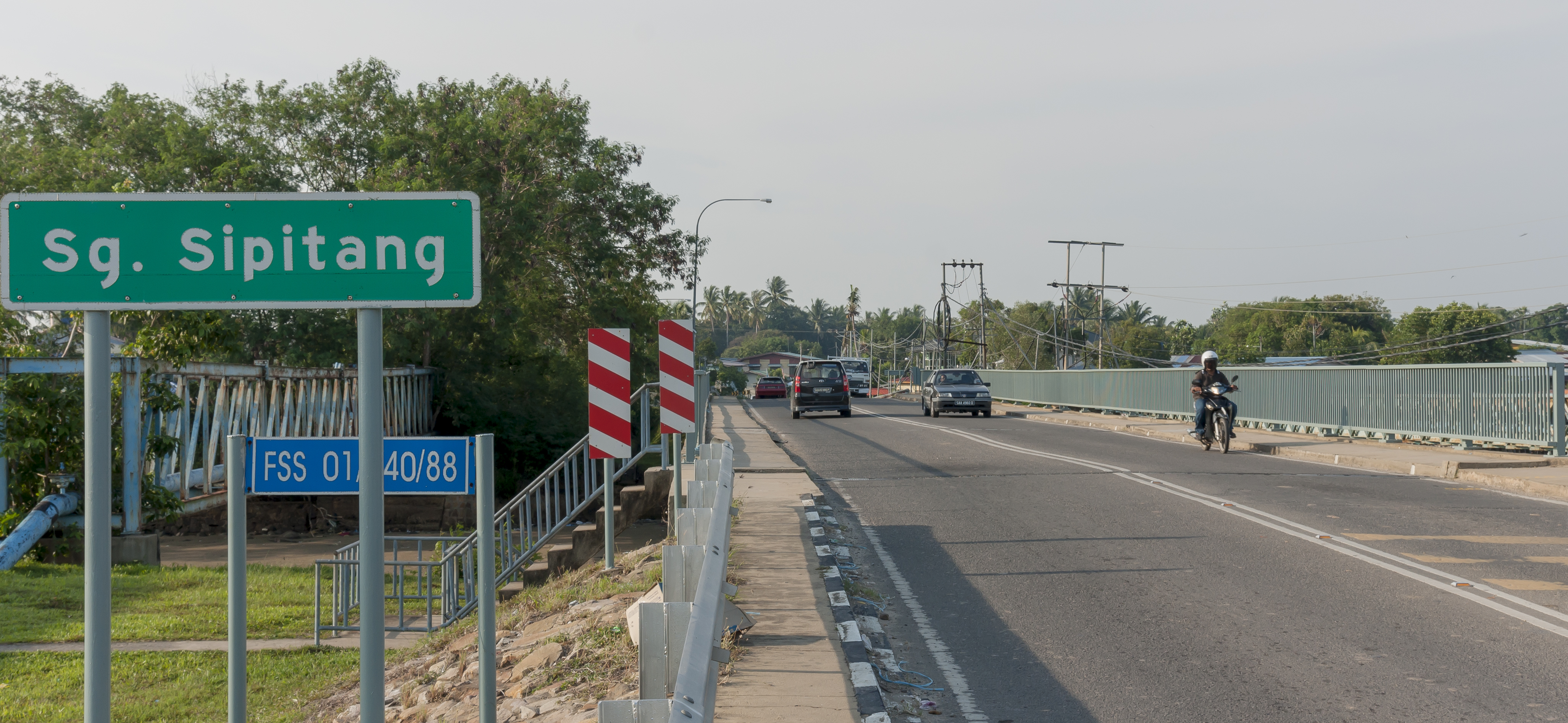
Sipitang Bridge.

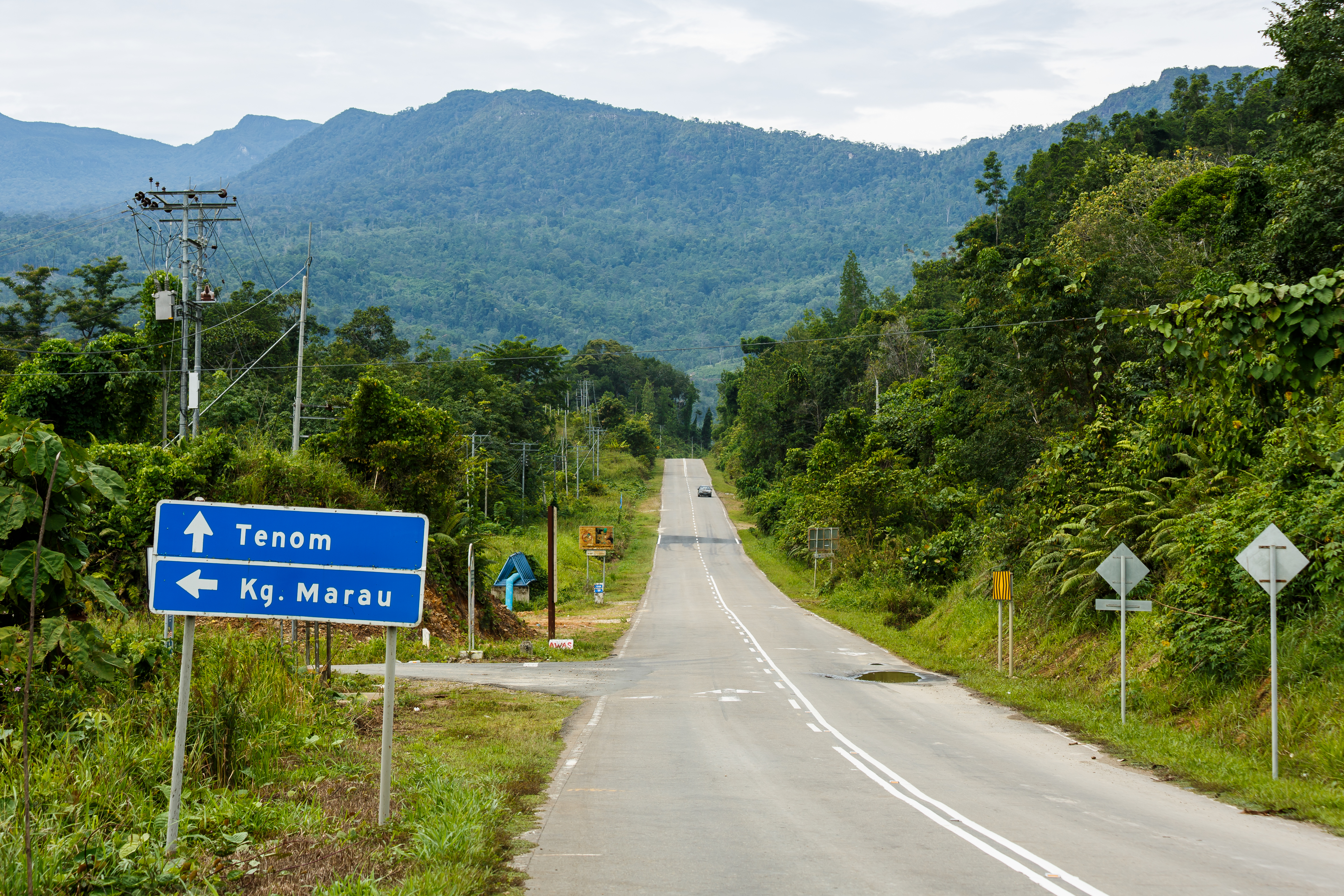
Sipitang-Tenom Road.

== See also ==
- Districts of Malaysia
- Long Pasia
