= SMK Pengiran Omar =

Sekolah Menengah Kebangsaan Pengiran Omar

Location
- Jalan SMKPO; Sipitang, Malaysia, Sabah; Malaysia
- Coordinates: 5.089517°N 115.553166°E

Information
- School type: Secondary School
- Motto: Cita Usaha Jaya
- Established: January 1965

Sekolah Menengah Kebangsaan Pengiran Omar (abbreviated SMKPO) is a secondary school located at the town of Sipitang, in the Interior Division of the state of Sabah, Malaysia. The school is listed as one of 90 pilot smart schools (Sekolah Bestari) in Malaysia. This school has achieved several awards for their academic and co-curricular performance and have also broken a Malaysian record.

== History ==
The school was first established in January 1965 and was originally called Government Junior Secondary School Sipitang. Its original site was in the middle of the Sipitang town. In 1968, the building was destroyed by a typhoon, hence the classes had to be moved to the new buildings which were still under construction at that time, which location is between Kampung Menengah and Kampung Pelakat in 1973, the school was upgraded to a Government Secondary School and the school's name was changed to Sekolah Menengah Pengiran Omar Sipitang in order to commemorate the late Pengiran Omar bin Syaifuddin for donating the land where the school was built. The school was nominated to be a smart school in 1999.

== Academic and co-curricular achievement ==
The school is active in rugby. On 6 April 2008 the school won 3rd place in the under 16 age category in the state finals.

The school was recently nominated to inquire two program from the Ministry of Education for F1 in school and for robot building. They also have broken the Malaysian record for the longest (thank you) card.
