= Long Pasia =

- Village
- Location within Borneo
- Coordinates: 4°24′28″N 115°43′19″E
- Country: Malaysia
- State: Sabah
- Division: Interior Division
- District: Sipitang

Government
  - Ketua Kampung: Yakub Sim

Population
  - Total: 1,000

Long Pasia is a tourist spot and eco tourism village in Ulu Padas River, Sipitang District, Sabah. Long Pasia is a home town of Lun Bawang/Lun Dayeh tribes and has a population of about 1,000 people, and all of them are Christians of Borneo Evangelical Church (SIB). It is located about 300 kilometres (190 mi) southwest of Kota Kinabalu.

Located at 1,000 m (3,300 ft) above sea level on the Maligan Highlands, it is adjacent to Payeh Maga.

Key economic activities are paddy planting and ecotourism. It is renowned for its diversity of orchid species, as well as pitcher plants which can be found in abundance in Long Pa' Sia' Kerangas Park and in forests around Ulu Padas river. It is also home to the Black Oriole, an endemic bird of Borneo.

There are several natural forest areas have been earmarked as potential areas to be developed as ecotourism attraction such as:

- Long Pasia Kerangas Conversation Area
- Long Pinasat Historical Stone
- Pulau Waterfall
- Reberuh Mekusul
- Tang Peu Long Midang burial site
- Ulu Padas River.
- Maga-Pasia Waterfall (Ruab Maga)
- Sinipung Mountain (Pegkung Sinipung)
- Sinipung Lake (Takung Sinipung)
- Sinipung View point
- Rekong Waterfall (Ruab Rekong)
- Estuary of Rekiran River (Pa' Rekiran)
- Pulau Waterfall (Pa' Pulau)
- Pinasat River (Long Pinasat)
- Matang River – Kuala Bayur, Yang Abpe, Batu Narit, Kuala Palanuk,
- Popokon, Yang Anang (Bukit Agathis)
- Fefuken Waterfall
- Other areas adjacent to Long Pasia Village and Resort Eco Etno Agrotourism Long Mio Village to be developed

== Notable visitors ==
Malaysian notable visitors:

- Musa Aman
- Shafie Apdal
- Hajiji Noor
- Acryl Sani Abdullah Sani
- Baru Bian
- Maximus Ongkili
- Yusof Yacob
- Yamani Hafez Musa
- Jailani Johari
- Jonathan Yasin
- Fairuz Renddan
- Mutang Tagal
- Isnaraissah Munirah Majilis

International notable visitors:

- Margrethe II of Denmark
- Henrik, Prince Consort of Denmark

== Notable Long Pasia ==
- Upai Semaring - Lundayeh the folk Legend
- Ronny Harun - former best ASEAN footballer player 2005/2006
- Jealius Ating - former Manager, Head Coach and player for Sabah FC
- Loro Wellkinson Peuji - former Malaysian Weightlifting athleti won bronze on SEA games.

== Facilities ==
- SK Long Pasia
- SIB Long Pasia Church
- Long Pasia Airport
- Klinik Kesihatan Desa Long Pasia
