= Lun Bawang =

Indigenous ethnic group of Borneo

Lun Bawang Lundayeh
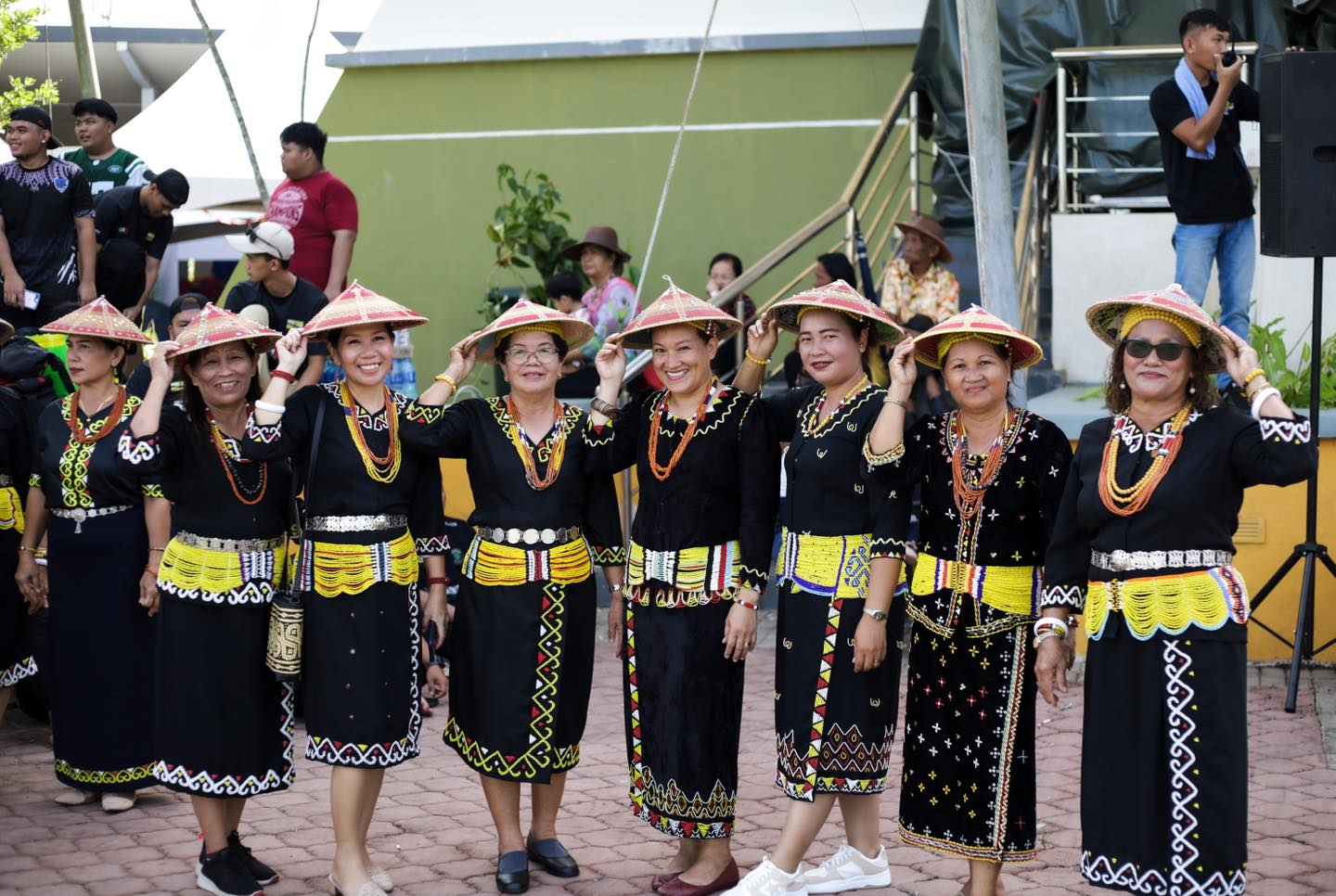
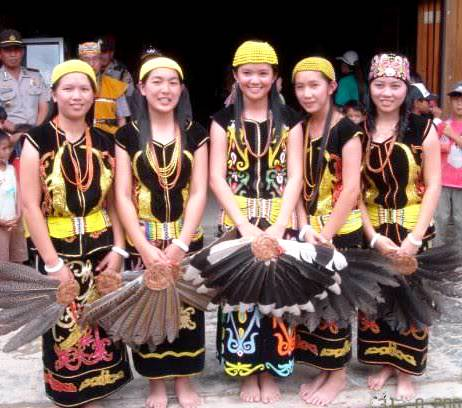
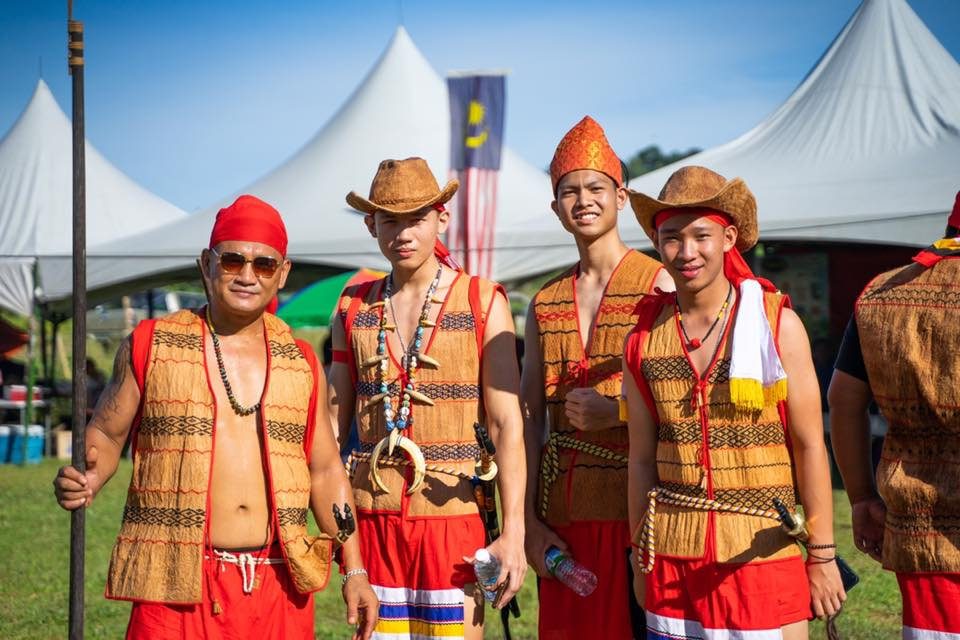
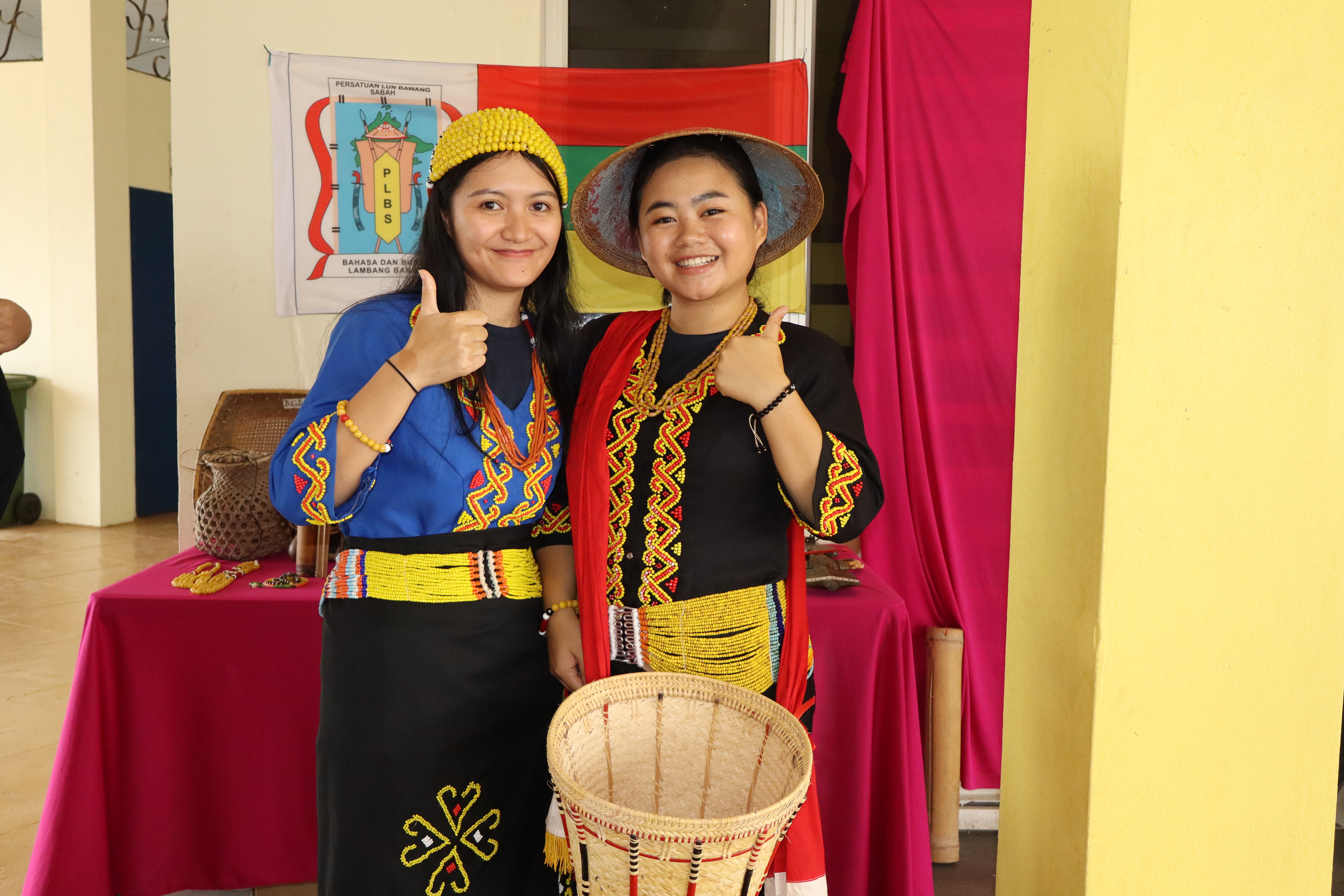
- From top to bottom: Lun Bawang elderly, young women and men in their respective traditional attire

Total population
- c. 50,550

Regions with significant populations
- Borneo
- Malaysia: 26,450 (2020 census)
- Sabah: 6,941 (2020 census)
- Sarawak: 17,676 (2020 census)
- Indonesia: 23,000 (2007 SIL)
- Brunei: 1,110 (2021 census)

Languages
- Lun Bawang (dialects include Trusan, Lun Daye, Papadi, Putoh/Putuk, Mengalong, Lun Dayah, Adang, Tabun, Treng, Kolur, Padas, Trusan and Lepu Potong), Malay, Malaysian, Indonesian, Brunei Malay, Sarawakian Malay, Sabahan, English

Religion
- Christianity (predominantly), Islam, Animism

Related ethnic groups
- Other Apo Duat peoples (Kelabit, Kiput, Berawan, Sa'ban), Lengilu, Putoh, Tring, other Orang Ulu

The Lun Bawang (formerly known as Trusan Murut and Mengalong Murut or Southern Murut) is an ethnic group found in Central Northern Borneo. They are indigenous to the southwest of Sabah (Interior Division including Labuan) and the northern region of Sarawak (Limbang Division), highlands of North Kalimantan (Long Bawan, Krayan, Malinau, Mentarang), and Brunei (Temburong District).

In the Malaysian state of Sarawak, the Lun Bawang (through the term Murut) are officially recognised by the Constitution as a native of Sarawak and are categorised under the Orang Ulu people; whilst in the neighbouring state of Sabah and Krayan highland in Kalimantan, they are sometimes named Lundayeh or Lun Daye. In Brunei, they are also identified by law as one of the 7 natives (indigenous people) of Brunei, through the term Murut. Nevertheless, in Sabah, Kalimantan, and Brunei, the term Lun Bawang is gaining popularity as a unifying term for this ethnicity across all regions. There are also other alternative names such as Lun Lod, Lun Baa', and Lun Tana Luun.

Lun Bawang people are traditionally agriculturalists and practise animal husbandry such as rearing poultry, pigs, and buffaloes. Lun Bawangs are also known to be hunters and fisherman.

== Etymology ==
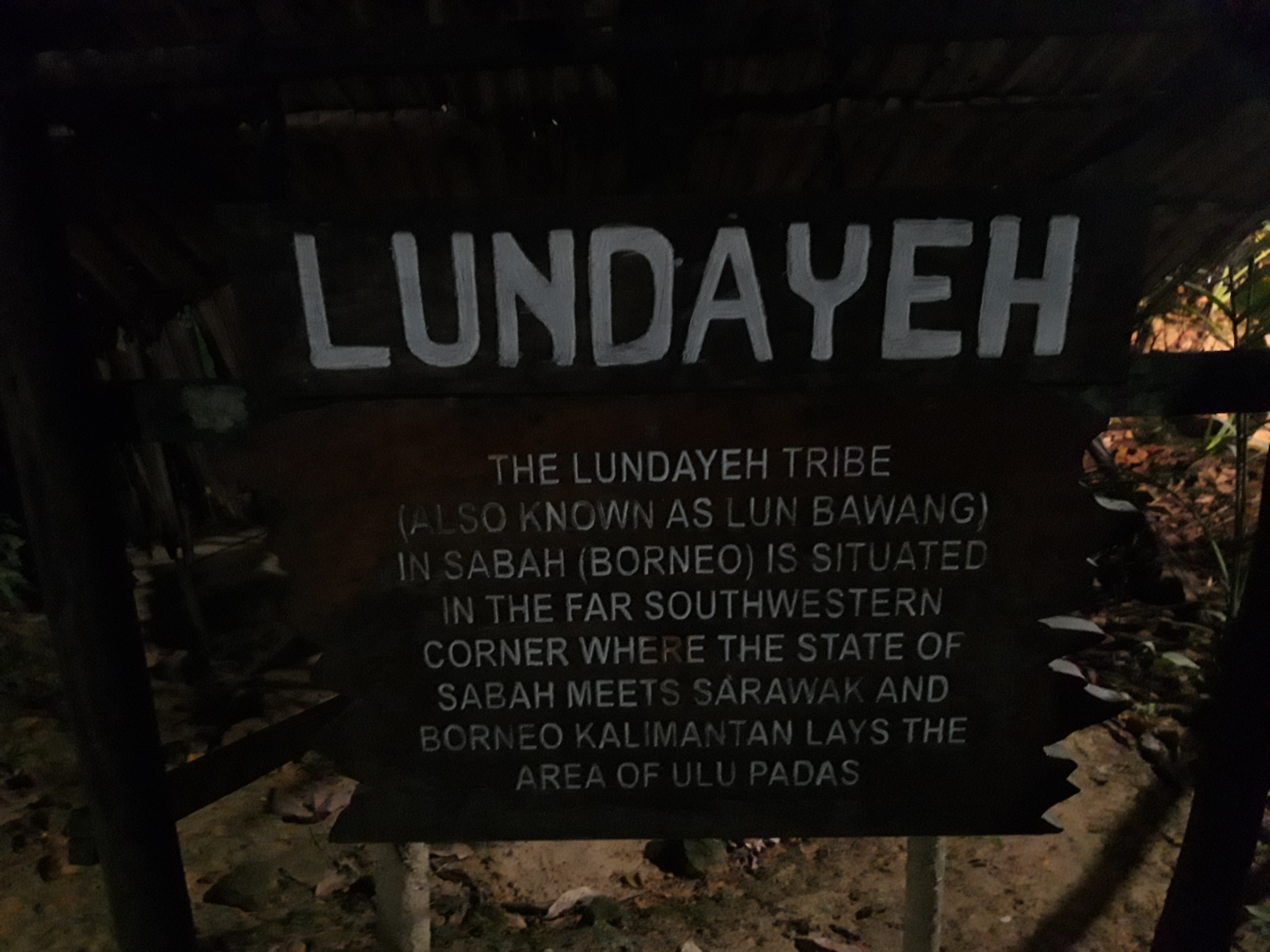
Lundayeh tribe sign at the Mari Mari Cultural Village in Inanam, Kota Kinabalu District of Sabah, Malaysia

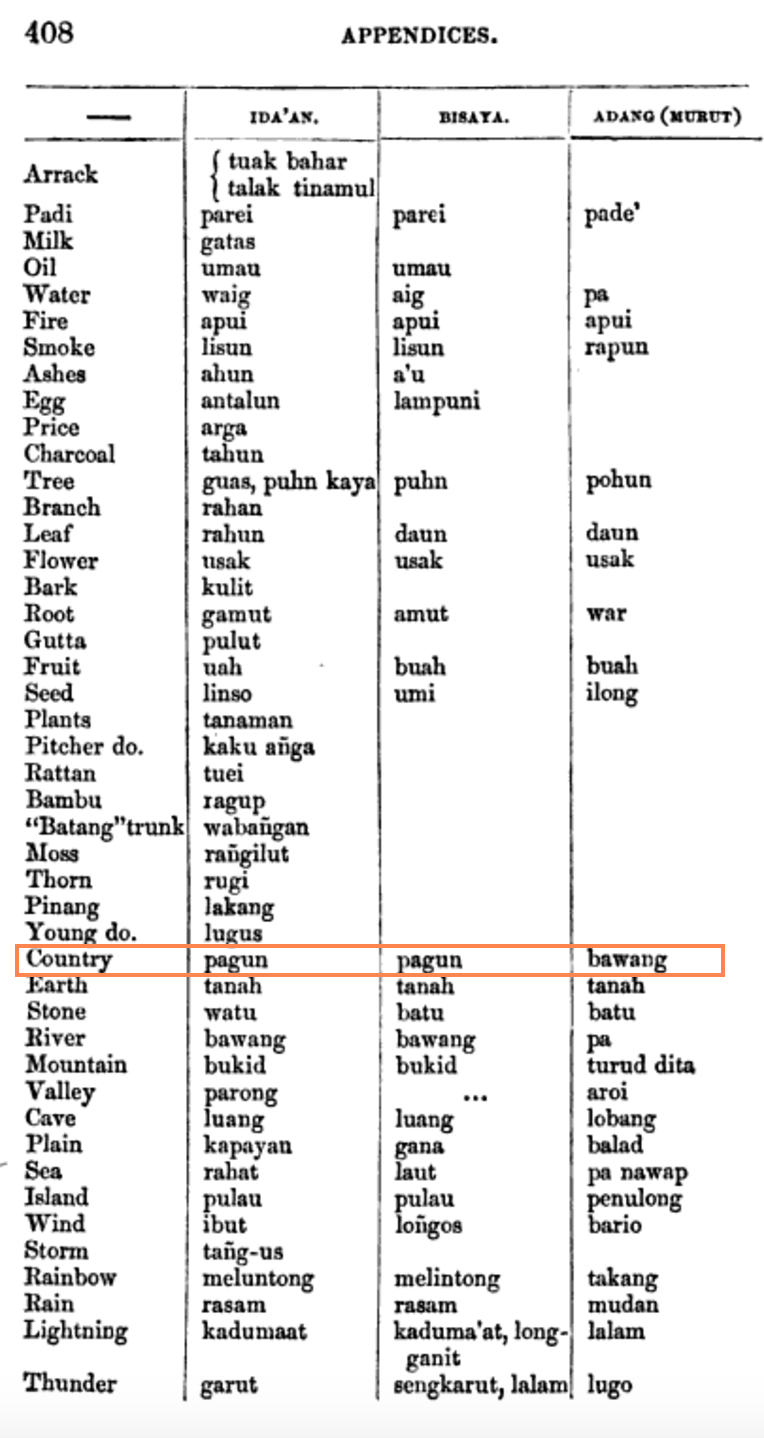
Translation of the word "Bawang" as recorded by Spencer St. John in 1862.

The word Lun Bawang means people of the country or native people, whilst Lun Dayeh means upriver people or people of the interior. Orang Ulu and Lun Lod means people living downriver or near the sea. Other names are derived from geographical reference to their rice cultivation, for example, Lun Baa' (swamps) who lives near swampy areas and grow wet rice, and Lun Tana' Luun (on the land) who cultivates dry rice.

While insisting that they never called themselves Murut, the Lun Bawangs were formerly identified as Murut by the British colonists and by outsiders (other ethnic groups). In Lun Bawang language, the word Murut either means 'to massage' or 'to give dowry', and these meanings have little or no relation at all to the identity of the people. The name Murut might have been derived from the word "Murud", a mountain located near an old Lun Bawang settlement, hence might have just meant 'mountain men' or 'hill people' but was instead used by the colonist to identify this ethnic group.

In addition to that, ethnologist found that the classification under the name Murut is confusing as the term is used differently in Sabah, Sarawak, and Brunei, that is whilst in Brunei and Sarawak it is used to describe the Lun Bawang people, in Sabah it is used to identify an ethnic group that that are significantly different in Sarawak.

In the early 1970s, the use of the term Lun Bawang began to gain popularity amongst ethnologists and linguists, and it is now the most commonly used term to identify this ethnic group. In Sarawak, the decision to replace the term 'Murut' with 'Lun Bawang' to identify this ethnic group was made unanimously by Lun Bawang community leaders, and the official usage of this term is now legally binding following the passing of Interpretation Act by Sarawak's Legislative Assembly in 2002.

== Background and origin ==
The Lun Bawangs are one of the indigenous ethnic groups who have inhabited Borneo island for centuries. According to Tom Harrisson (1959) and S. Runciman (1960), the Lun Bawang community is one of the earlier settlers in the mountainous regions of central Borneo and they are related to the Kelabit tribe. Both tribes are linked to a common lineage termed the Apo Duat or "Apad Uat" people, of which Apo Duat is the area consisting of the Krayan highland and Kelabit Highlands.

One theory suggests that Apo Duat is the homeland of this common ancestor and that they have expanded out to the coastal area. The migration of these people to the low lands and gradual spreading out might have been spurred by various waves of migration of the Lun Bawang people from different clans. The migration of Lun Bawang people from one clan to a region already inhabited by another clan, causes the latter to move to another region, despite them having a similar culture and language. The strong clan identity of the Lun Bawang people is shown by their common tradition of identifying themselves based on their village or geographical location, for example, 'Lun Adang' who once resides in the Adang river basin or 'Lun Kemaloh' who comes from the Kemaloh river.

One other theory suggests that these Apo Duat people were once natives of old Brunei, but were pushed upriver into the highlands by the invading tribes such as Kayan, Kenyah, and Iban people. The ones that remained downriver (Lun Bawang people) were isolated from the ones who migrated to the highlands (Kelabit), causing their culture and language to slightly diverge.

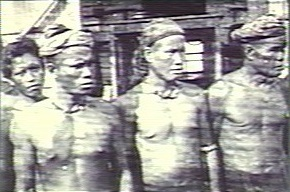
Four Lun Bawang tribesman from Sarawak, previously called Trusan Muruts, photos taken by ethnologist Charles Hose in 1896.

Another theory, on the other hand, suggests that the migration originated from the opposite side of Borneo (now North Kalimantan). It was suggested that the Apo Duat people were once farmers in the lowlands downstream of the Malinau river, living closely with the Tidong people. However, attacks by Muslim raiders (Bugis and Tausug) probably in the 17th century, caused them to migrate to the Krayan highlands, whilst the Tidong people converted to Islam. Nevertheless, these theories have yet to be proven and there is no substantial evidence to trace the origin of the Lun Bawang people or to prove any of these theories.

== History ==
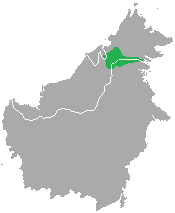
Geographical distribution of Lun Bawang speakers.

=== Relations with the Kingdom of Brunei ===
According to Brunei oral tradition, the Lun Bawangs (Murut) were brought under the rule of the Brunei kingdom by peaceful measures during the reign of Awang Alak Betatar. This is said to be accomplished through dealings between the Lun Bawang and Awang Alak Betatar's brother, Awang Jerambok. Under the rule of the Brunei kingdom, the Lun Bawang were subject to taxes and tribute. The local leaders from the higher class (lun mebala or lun do) were appointed titles of nobility and were granted an office in the sultanate. Some Lun Bawang were assimilated into Malay culture. Lun Bawang community located near the Brunei capital was firmly integrated into the Brunei polity.

Awang Alak Betatar and his 13 brothers were the founding fathers of Brunei, and are believed to be half Muruts, as they had a common Murut father by the name of Upai Semaring or Awang Semaun. These 14 saudaras or 14 brothers are Kelabit (Murut) and their followers were early "empire builders" of Brunei. Lun Bawangs and Kelabits (Muruts) are of royal descent from the House of Bolkiah, as they use titles such as Dayang, Sultan, Agong, and Pengiran, names used by their ancestors in the past.

Nevertheless, the peace dealing between the Lun Bawang and the Brunei Malay rulers was by no means everlasting as throughout the history of Brunei sultanate, the Lun Bawang had often rebelled against its Brunei ruler. It has been suggested that the insurrection of the Maruts (sic) - i.e. the Lun Bawangs - and Chinese had led to the Brunei Sultan requesting assistance from the Sulu sultanate to suppress the rebellion in 1658, which resulted in the Brunei Sultan ceding his territory of Kimanis until Tapean Durian to the Sultan of Sulu as a sign of gratitude.

=== Lun Bawangs with Europeans settlement ===
Early Europeans used the exonym Maroot, Marut, Morut, or Murut to describe the Lun Bawang people, and this might have been introduced by the Brunei Malays who came in contact with them in Brunei. The earliest European written account of the Lun Bawang people is probably by Thomas Forrest during his voyage to New Guinea, the Moluccas, and Balambangan in 1776. He described that the Borneans (sic - i.e. Bruneians -) tended to preclude the Chinese or European from directly dealing with the Maroot in trade, reserving the trade (as middlemen) to themselves.

In John Hunt's Sketch of Borneo or Pulo Kalamantan in 1812, he described the Lun Bawangs as aborigines of Borneo proper, and that they are much fairer and better featured than the Malays, having a stronger and robust frame and are credited as a brave race of people. Europeans have also obtained the description of the Lun Bawang from Brunei Malays who came in contact with them. For example, during the voyage of the American Himmaleh to Brunei, Brunei noblemen (pangeran) reported that there are 21 tribes in Brunei - Murut being one of them - and that these tribes are kafir (do not practice Islam) and practices headhunting. During Henry Keppel's expedition to Borneo, he noted that the Lun Bawang are the inhabitants of the Borneo interior and that the Murut and Dyak people had given place to Kayan people whenever they are in contact with each other. Sir James Brooke in his journal written on 24 December 1850, described the oppression that the Lun Bawang (then called Limbang Muruts) people faced by Brunei aristocrats, and where some had fought against this tyranny.

A more elaborate European account of the Lun Bawang people is by Spenser St. John in 1860, where he described the impoverished condition of the Lun Bawang (then called Limbang Muruts) people under the rule of the Brunei Sultanate. He also gave an account of the aborigines (Murut and Bisaya) rise to insurrection. However, these rebellions were always suppressed by threats from the Brunei government to bring in Kayans to subdue the opposition. Spenser St. John also described the tyranny conducted by the Brunei aristocrats upon the Limbang Muruts, which include seizing their children to be sold as slaves if taxes were not paid, and on one occasion, when the Brunei capital was in a state of alarm by the marauding Kayan warriors, the Brunei aristocrat offered a whole Limbang Murut village to be pillaged, in return for the safety of the capital.

== Culture and economic activities ==
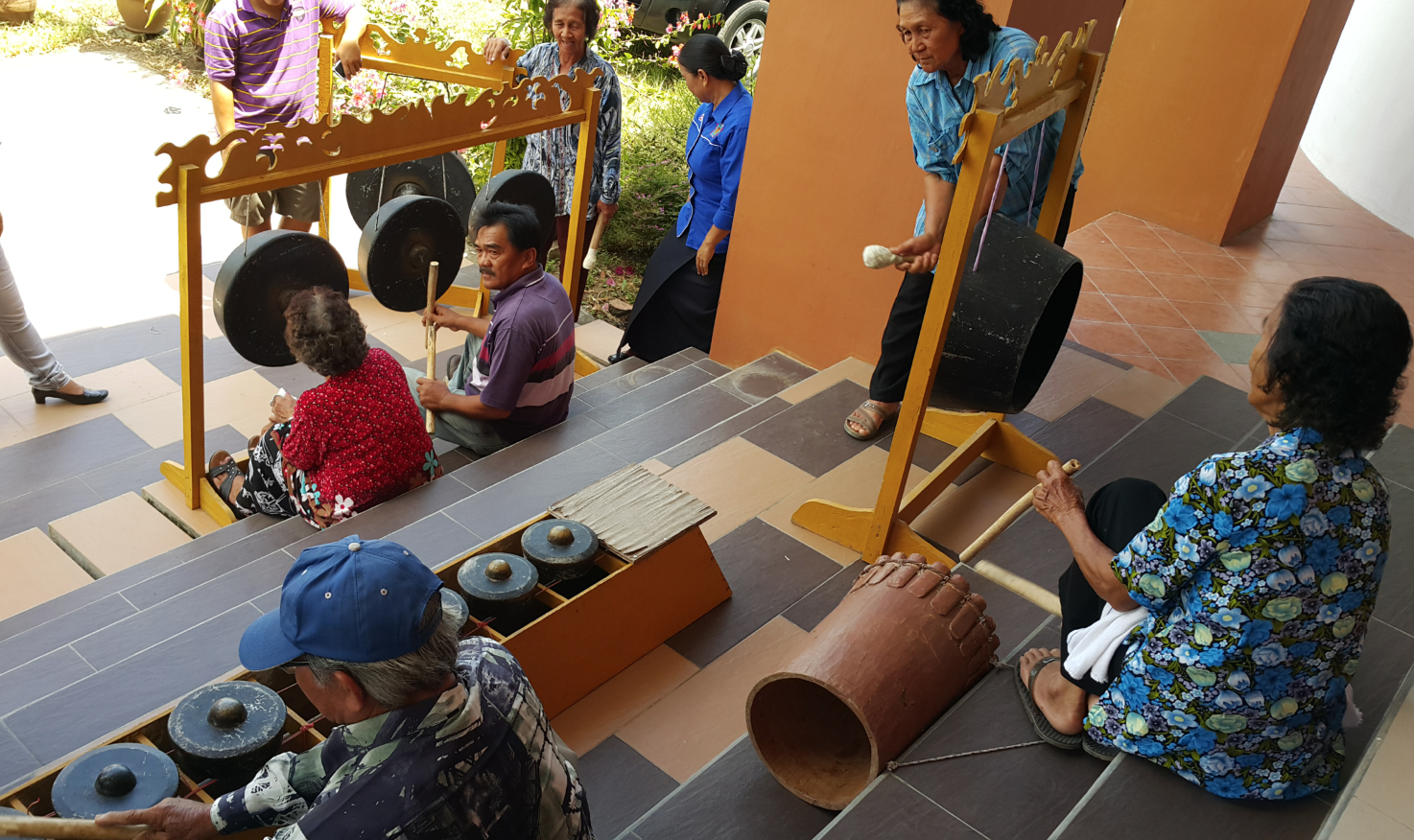
Lun Bawang in Sabah playing their musical instrument, kelinang and agung

Almost all of the traditional economical activities of the Lun Bawang and are related to rice plantation, and they cultivate both rice on a hill called lati' tana' luun and rice from a paddy field called lati' ba. The production of rice is related to ones' prestige/financial status, as an excess of rice harvest is traditionally consumed in huge irau feast, signifying wealth and fortune. Cooked rice is wrapped inside banana leaves called Luba' Laya, and rice is also brewed into rice wine or burak for practical reasons. Partly due to this, drinking burak had been an important (and also notorious, as is deemed by the Christian missionaries and the Brooke government) custom of the Lun Bawangs, but now the rice wine production has significantly dwindled due to effort done by the Christian missionaries and Brooke government to encourage prohibition of alcohol amongst the community in the early 20th century.

Meat and fish are brined or pickled using salt and are stored in hollow bamboo stalk for a month and the pickled food is called telu' . Meat and fish are also preserved by smoking. Salt is obtained by evaporating brine from salt spring (lubang mein). Cattle and buffaloes are bred for their meat and can serve as a symbol of financial status. These animals are commonly used as dowry that is presented to the bride's family from the groom's side.

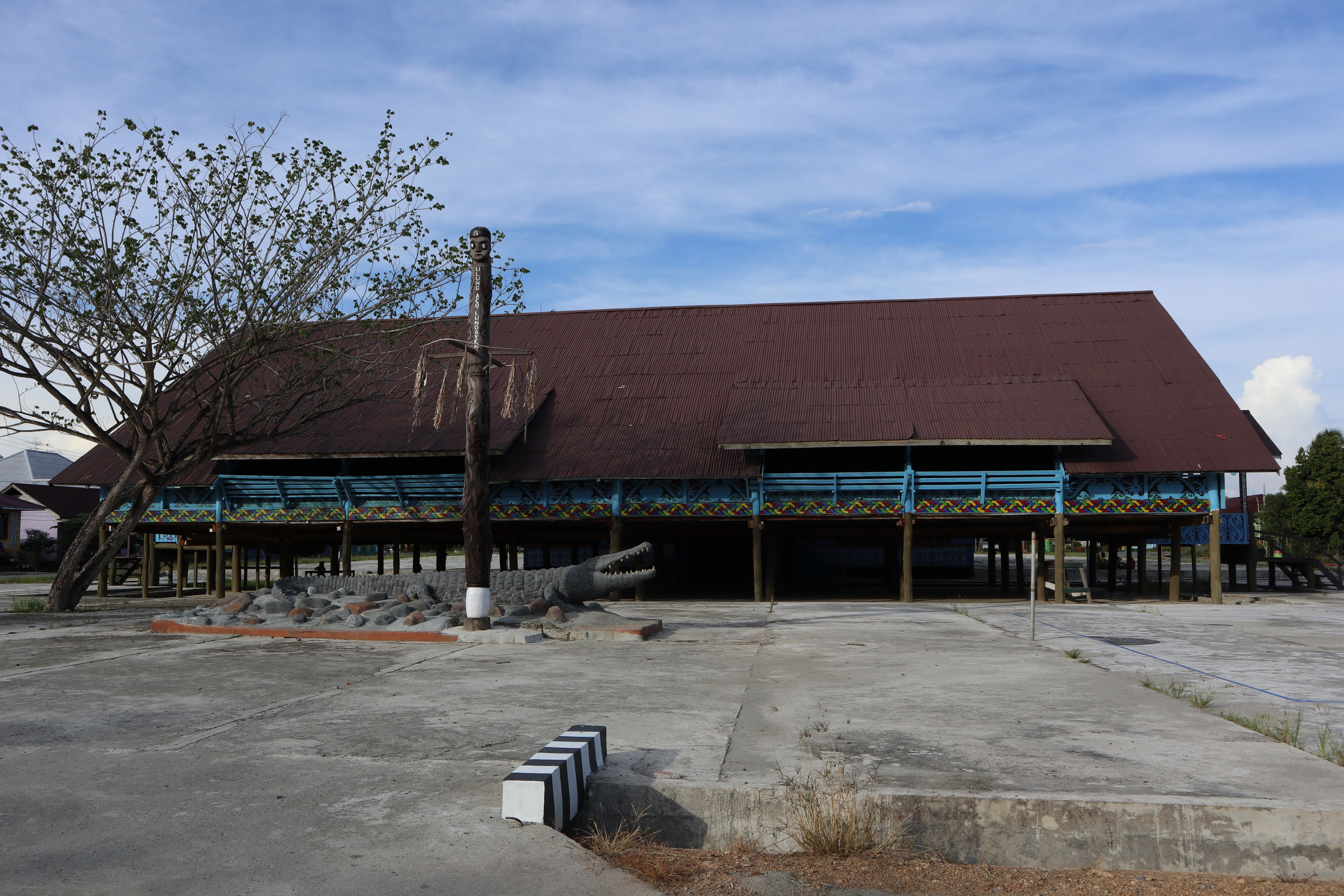
A Traditional Lundayeh Longhouse in Desa Pulau Sapi, Malinau, North Kalimantan, Indonesia

In the old days, the men wear jackets made of tree barks called kuyu talun. Cloth wrapped around the forehead is called sigar and loincloth is called abpar. A long machete (pelepet) is tied to the waist, especially when it needs to be carried to tribal wars. As for the women, they wear pata on their head, beret on their waist, bane around the neck, and gileng or pakel is worn as ornaments on their hands and wrists. "Pata", or cap made entirely of bead, is worn as a status symbol.

The Lun Bawang belong to a group termed as Nulang Arc group (Metcalf 1975). This, along with other ethnicities such as the Berawans, the Melanaus, and the Kajangs traditionally practised an ancient tradition of secondary treatment of the dead. In Lun Bawang, this is called mitang butung. Metcalf theorised that this practice is a characteristic of the most ancient cultural tradition in Borneo, before the arrival of other invading ethnics that influenced the diversification of culture and language in Borneo.

=== Language ===
Lun Bawang among the languages of Kalimantan (code lnd, light red#30, top)

The Lun Bawangs called their language Buri Lun Bawang or Buri tau, ''our language''. The language is classified under Austronesian > Western Malayo-Polynesian > North Bornean > North Sarawak > Dayic (Apo Duat/Apad Uat) family.

=== Lun Bawang cuisine ===
- Nuba Laya or Nuba Tinga is cooked Bario rice which is mashed and wrapped in leaves of the Phacelophrynium maximum plant. It is considered the centerpiece of a meal for the Lun Bawang and Kelabit people. Accompaniments may include a small bowl of porridge (kikid), shredded beef cooked with wild ginger and dried chilli (labo senutuq), deboned shredded fish (a'beng), wild jungle vegetables prepared in various ways, and so on.
- Daun ubi tumbuk or pucuk ubi tumbuk is a preparation of cassava leaves (known as empasak by the Iban) which has the consistency of pesto, and is widely eaten among Sarawak's native communities. The pounded leaves may be sauteed with seasonings like anchovies and chilli, stuffed into a bamboo tube and roasted over an open fire, or simply boiled with shallot, fat and salt.
- Kelupis, which literally translates as 'glutinous rice rolls' in English. It is typically produced in large batches by the community in preparation for a traditional wedding ceremony.
- Sinamu Baka is a Lun Bawang/Lundayeh traditional food. This is a tangy fermented food similar to Bosou of the Kadazan-Dusun people but the difference is that Sinamu Baka is made of only fermented wild boar meat, and not other types of meat.
- Narar Baka refers to Lun Bawang/Lundayeh-style smoked meat, which is usually wild boar meat (baka). Barbecued on a char-griller and eaten with rice and dipping sauces, narar baka can be found and purchased in rural areas and towns. Halal versions substitute wild boar meat for other game meats such as venison.

=== Festivals and celebrations ===
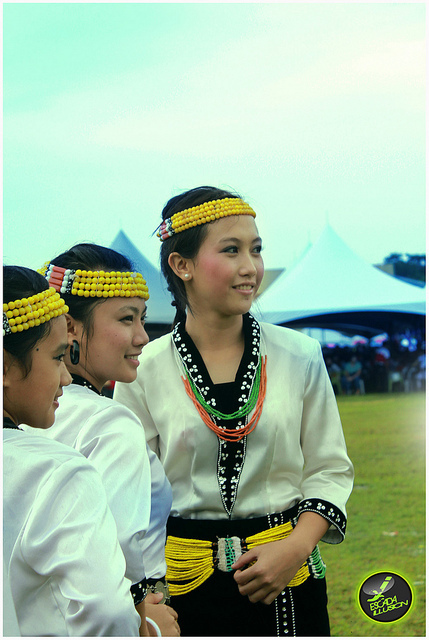
Lundayeh women from Sabah, Malaysia in traditional attire

Lun Bawang people celebrate Irau Aco Lun Bawang (Lun Bawang festival) annually on the first of June in Lawas, Sarawak. This festival is traditionally a celebration of the rice harvest, but now it showcases a variety of Lun Bawang culture and events such as Ruran Ulung (beauty pageant contest) and ngiup suling (bamboo musical instrument band). In Sipitang district of Sabah, Sabahan Lundayeh celebrates the harvest festival (Kaamatan) biennially during the festival of GATA (Gasing and Tamu Besar), during which traditional dances and costumes are being showcased along with those of other native ethnics in the district such as the Murut, Kedayan and Bruneian Malay people. Being a predominantly Christian community, Lun Bawang in Indonesian parts of northern Kalimantan also traditionally celebrates the "Irau Rayeh" since the 1950s, which is an Easter festival and celebration.

=== Religion ===
Lun Bawangs were mostly animist before the 1920s. Under the rule of the White Rajahs (Vyner Brooke) in Sarawak, Christian missionaries (particularly of the Borneo Evangelical Mission (BEM)) had better accessibility to the Lun Bawang settlements in the interior and highlands and proceeded to preach Christianity to the Lun Bawang people. The majority of the Lun Bawangs are Christians, predominantly of the BEM. A small number are of other Christian denominations, such as True Jesus Church, the Seventh-day Adventist Church, the Roman Catholic Church, or of another religion, such as Islam and Buddhism.

== Standard of living ==
Before the rule of the White Rajahs, the Lun Bawang tribe was in a deplorable state; frequently involved in tribal wars, headhunting, and excessive alcohol consumption. The Lun Bawang tribe was often a victim of political manipulation by the Sultanate of Brunei. For example they were used as sacrifice for the marauding Kayan people who threaten to attack the Brunei capital in the 1860s. The low standard of living led to a severe outbreak of diseases (cholera and smallpox) amongst the community, and the population significantly dwindled to the point of near extinction in the 1920s. With the advent of Rajah rule and conversion to Christianity, the standard of living improved tremendously, as the missionaries introduced better healthcare, a sanitary system, and proper education system. The Lun Bawang were very zealous at school, and in 1940, about 95% of the Lun Bawang and related Kelabit tribe under 20s in Lawas Damit are literate. The BEM movement has played a major role in the social and economic development of the Lun Bawang community, especially in educating the people on the importance of education and health, also in maintaining peace between Lun Bawang people and those from other ethnic living nearby.

Whilst many Lun Bawangs attained a higher level of education in nearby towns such as Lawas, Limbang, and Miri, and in Sabah, Sipitang and Beaufort; and subsequently furthering their studies in the state capitals or in Peninsular Malaysia, there is still relatively little development of schools in Lun Bawang settlement in the interior, such as Long Pasia or Ba' Kelalan. Therefore, many Lun Bawang youth in the interior travel a distance from their home to pursue education, sometimes via river transport or gravel road. Job intake in some of the main industries in Sabah and Sarawak, such as oil and gas and palm oil industry remains relatively small, and some are still involved in subsistence farming and fishing. However, with continued efforts, many of them managed to become professionals. A 2011 statistics have shown that there are around 233 graduates amongst the Lun Bawang community in Sarawak.

== Notable people ==
=== Sarawak ===
- James Yaakub from Lawas – A former professional football player for Malaysia FA and win the Sea Games 1977 as well as play for Sarawak United FC and win the Borneo Cup 1983.
- Henry Sum Agong from Lawas, Sarawak – The former Deputy Minister of Transport, the former Deputy Minister of Rural Development, former Deputy Minister of Domestic Trade, Cooperatives and Consumerism of Malaysia and incumbent Member of the Parliament of Malaysia for Lawas constituency (P222 Lawas).
- Baru Bian from Ba'kelalan, Lawas, Sarawak – former Minister of Works, member of the Sarawak State Assembly for Ba'kelalan (N81 Ba'kelalan) and member of the Parliament of Malaysia for Selangau consistency (P214 Selangau (federal constituency)).
- Mutang Tagal – from Ba'kelalan, Lawas, President of the Dewan Negara of Malaysia, Romania honour consulate in Sarawak and former Member of the Parliament of Malaysia.

=== Sabah ===
- Ronny Harun from Long Pasia, Sipitang – A professional footballer for Malaysia under-23 team from 2003 until 2006. He played in 2006 Asian Games, 2004 Olympic Games qualifier, 2003 SEA Games and 2005 SEA Games and currently is the captain for Sarawak FA. He is one of 10 ASEAN players given the title AFF Best XI for the year 2016.
- Mafry Balang from Sipitang, Sabah – Former Malaysian football player for Sabah FA, Malacca FA and Kelantan FA. He is currently the captain for Penang FA team.
- Maxsius Musa from Keningau, Sabah – Malaysian football player for Sabah FA win Sukma 2012 and Malaysia Premier League 2019.

=== Brunei ===
- Fadlin Galawat from Batu Apoi, Temburong – Former professional football player for Brunei FA and DPMM FC, winner of 1999 Malaysia Cup.
