= Interior Division =

Administrative division of Sabah, Malaysia

Coordinates: 4.7500°N 116.1333°E

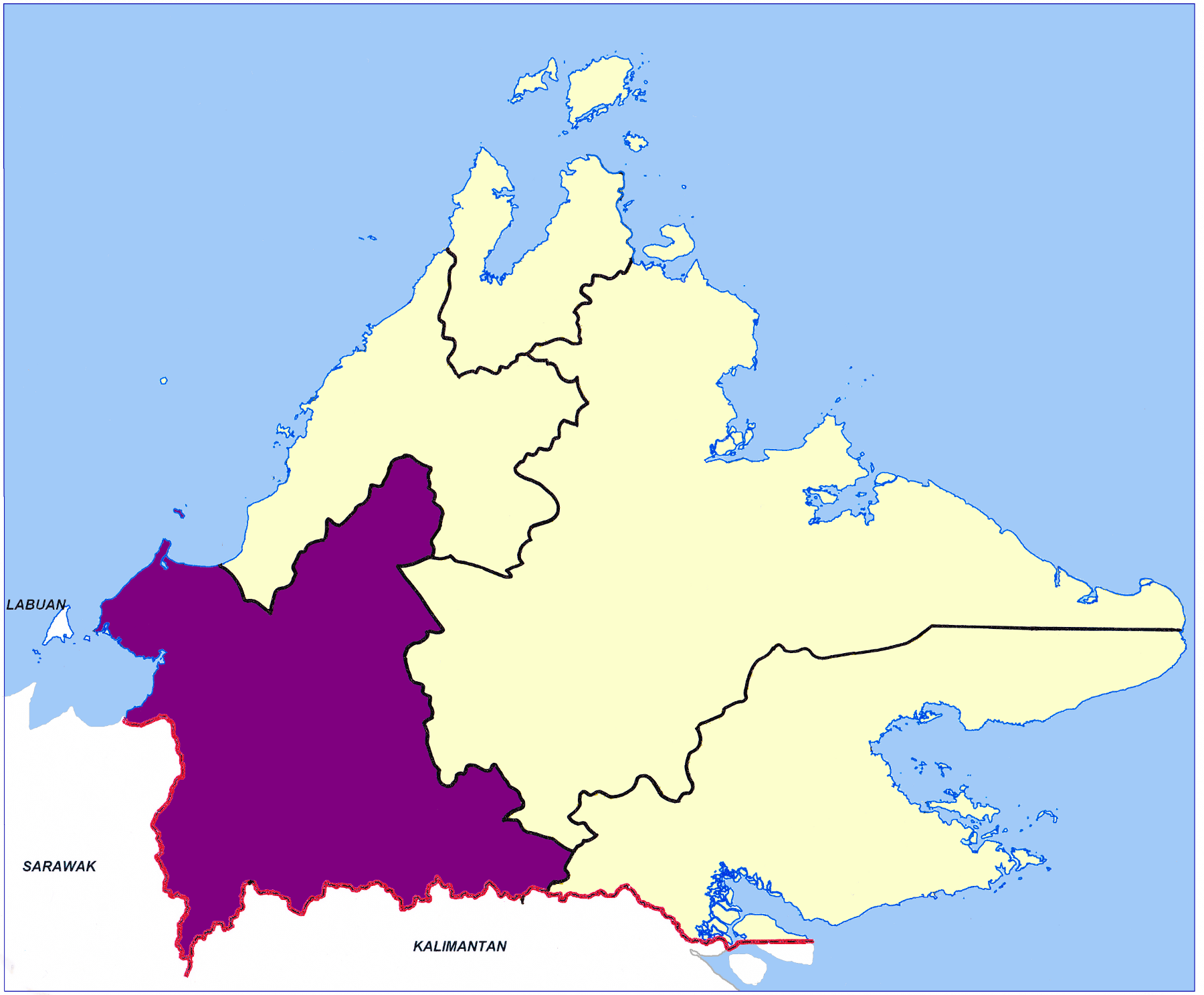
Location map of the Interior Division.

The Interior Division (Malay: Bahagian Pedalaman) is an administrative division of the state of Sabah, Malaysia. It occupies the southwest portion of Sabah, bordered by the neighbouring state of Sarawak on its west. With an area of 18,298 square kilometres, it covers 24.9% of Sabah's territory and is home to approximately 14.7% of Sabah's total population. The largest town in the Interior Division is Keningau. Other main towns in this division include Beaufort, Kuala Penyu, Sipitang, Tambunan and Tenom.

The coastal parts of the Division are settled mainly by Bisaya, Bruneian Malays and Kedayan, whereas the inland areas to the east of the Crocker Range are mostly settled by various subgroups of the Dusun people. The town of Tambunan is considered to be a major centre of Dusun culture, while Tenom is the largest town in the heartland of the Murut people. The Long Pasia and Long Mio are the gateway to the Lun Bawang/ Lun Dayeh tribes in Sipitang. In addition, there are large numbers of Chinese people in most of the towns, particularly Beaufort, Keningau and Tenom. The majority of the Division's ethnic Chinese residents are of the Hakka subgroup.

== Districts ==
Interior Division is subdivided into the following administrative districts:

- Beaufort District (1,735 km^{2}) (Beaufort Town)
- Keningau District (3,533 km^{2}) (Keningau Town)
- Kuala Penyu District (453 km^{2}) (Kuala Penyu Town)
- Membakut District (Membakut Town)
- Nabawan District (6,089 km^{2}) (Nabawan Town)
- Sipitang District (2,732 km^{2}) (Sipitang Town)
- Tambunan District (1,347 km^{2}) (Tambunan Town)
- Tenom District (2,409 km^{2}) (Tenom Town)
- Sook District (Sook Town)

== Constituencies ==
Interior division is divided into six federal constituencies and 14 state constituencies:

Parliament			Legislative Assembly		
Constituency	MPs (2022)	Party	Constituency	MLAs (2020)	Party
P176 Kimanis	Mohamad Alamin	BN (UMNO)	N30 Bongawan	Daud Yusof	WARISAN
P176 Kimanis	Mohamad Alamin	BN (UMNO)	N31 Membakut	Mohd Arifin Mohd Arif	GRS (GAGASAN)
P177 Beaufort	Siti Aminah Aching	BN (UMNO)	N32 Klias	Isnin Aliasnih	GRS (GAGASAN)
P177 Beaufort	Siti Aminah Aching	BN (UMNO)	N33 Kuala Penyu	Limus Jury	GRS (GAGASAN)
P178 Sipitang	Matbali Musah	GRS	N34 Lumadan	Ruslan Muharam	GRS (PBS)
P178 Sipitang	Matbali Musah	GRS	N35 Sindumin	Yusof Yacob	GRS (GAGASAN)
P180 Keningau	Jeffrey Kitingan	GRS (STAR)	N39 Tambunan	Jeffrey Kitingan	STAR
P180 Keningau	Jeffrey Kitingan	GRS (STAR)	N40 Bingkor	Robert Tawik	STAR
P180 Keningau	Jeffrey Kitingan	GRS (STAR)	N41 Liawan	Annuar Ayub Aman	STAR
P181 Tenom	Riduan Rubin	KDM	N42 Melalap	Vacant	
P181 Tenom	Riduan Rubin	KDM	N43 Kemabong	Rubin Balang	GRS (GAGASAN)
P182 Pensiangan	Arthur Joseph Kurup	BN (PBRS)	N44 Tulid	Flovia Ng	STAR
P182 Pensiangan	Arthur Joseph Kurup	BN (PBRS)	N45 Sook	Ellron Alfred Angin	STAR
P182 Pensiangan	Arthur Joseph Kurup	BN (PBRS)	N46 Nabawan	Abdul Ghani Mohamed Yassin	GRS (GAGASAN)

== History ==
The present divisions of Sabah is largely inherited from the division of the North Borneo Chartered Company. Following the acquisition of North Borneo under the royal charter issued in 1881, the administrative division introduced by Baron von Overbeck was continued by the establishment of two residences comprising West Coast Residency and East Coast Residency. Seat of the two residents was in Sandakan, where the governor was based. Each resident, in turn, was divided into several provinces managed by a district officer. (Note: The original position was initially Magistrates-in-charge.)

As North Borneo progresses, the number of residencies has increased to five including: Tawau Residency (also known as East Coast Residency), Sandakan Residency, West Coast Residency, Kudat Residency, and Interior Residency; the provinces were initially named after the members of the board: Alcock, Cunlife, Dewhurst, Keppel, Dent, Martin, Elphinstone, Myburgh and Mayne. The senior residents occupied Sandakan and the West Coast, while the other three resident with the second class residencies occupied Interior, East Coast and Kudat. The residents of Sandakan and West Coast were members of the Legislative Council, the Legislative Assembly of the company.

The division into residencies was maintained when North Borneo became a Crown Colony after World War II. On 16 September 1963, with the formation of Malaysia, North Borneo which subsequently became the state of Sabah took over the administrative structure through the Ordinance on Administrative Units. At the same time, the Yang di-Pertua Negeri, the head of state of Sabah, was authorised by proclamation to divide the state into divisions and districts. (Note: The most recent such proclamation dates from 2009: Administrative Divisions Proclamation 2009.) The abolition of the residency term was in favour of the division term that took place in 1976.

Today, the division has only formal significance and no longer constitutes its own administrative level. The resident's post was also abolished, as Sabah's municipal administration is in the hands of the district officers.

== See also ==
- Divisions of Malaysia

== Literature ==
- Tregonning, K. G. (1965). A History Of Modern Sabah (North Borneo 1881–1963). University of Malaya Press.
