= Beaufort, Malaysia =

Beaufort
- Town and district capital
- Pekan Beaufort; Beaufort Town

Other transcription(s)
  - Jawi: بعوفورت
  - Chinese: 保佛 (Simplified) 保佛 (Traditional); Bǎo fú (Hanyu Pinyin)
- Seal
- Etymology: Named after former British Governor Leicester Paul Beaufort
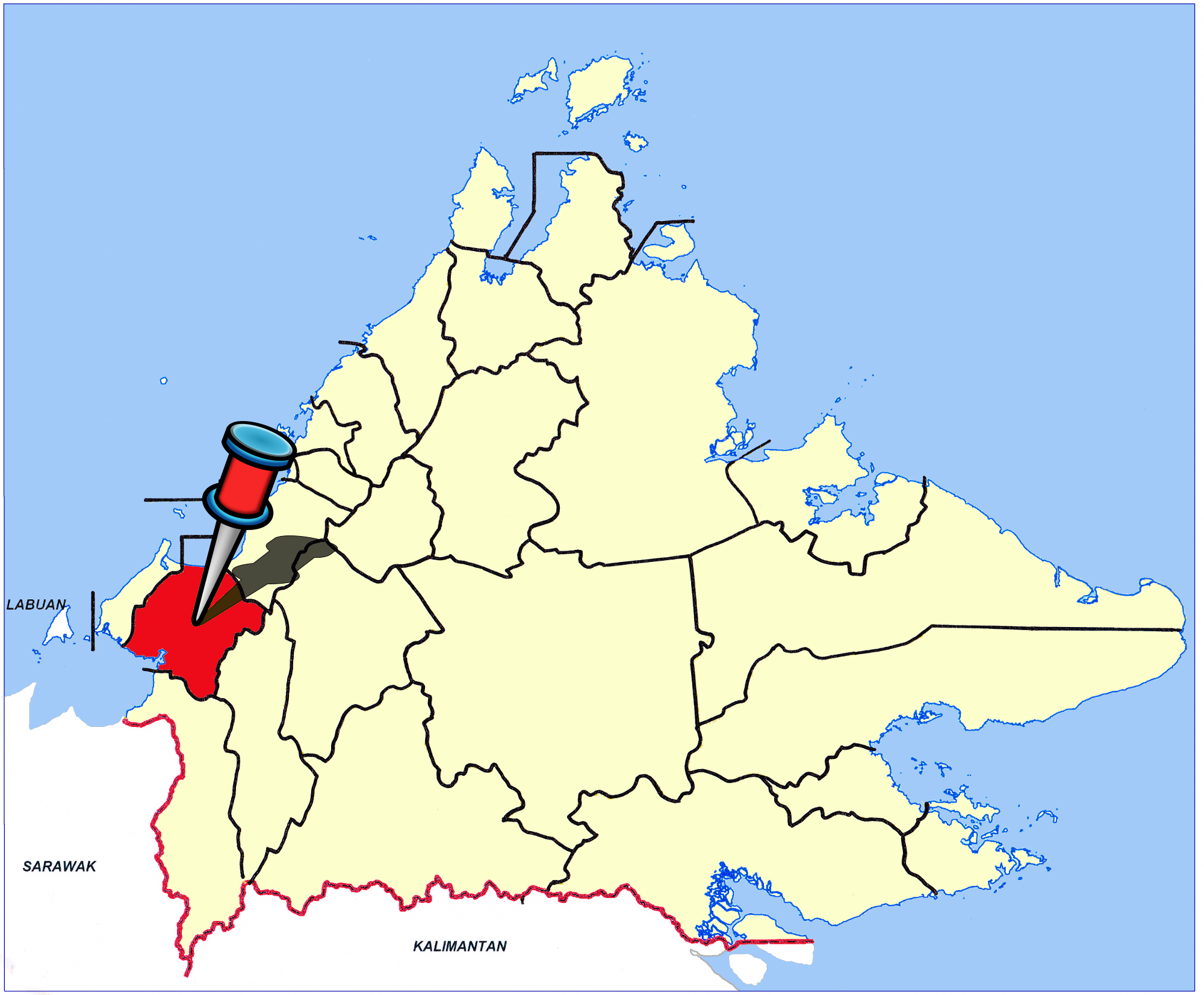
- Coordinates: 5°20′49″N 115°44′35″E
- Country: Malaysia
- State: Sabah
- Division: Interior
- District: Beaufort
- Seat: Beaufort

Population (2010)
  - Total: 12,742

Beaufort (/ˈboʊfərt/ BOH-fərt) or in Sabahan colloquial spelling "Bopot" is the capital of the Beaufort District in the Interior Division of Sabah, Malaysia. It was named after former British Governor Leicester Paul Beaufort. Its population was estimated to be around 12,742 in 2010. It is about 90 kilometres south of Kota Kinabalu and about 167 kilometres north of Long Pasia (one of the famous tourist attractions in Interior Division). It has shophouses built high above the roads to avoid the periodic floods of the Padas River. The population of Beaufort is composed mainly of Bisaya, Brunei Malays, Kadazan-Dusuns, Lun Bawang/Lun Dayeh, Muruts and Chinese (mainly Hakkas). Bisaya are the majority ethnic, and the population is scattered around the town. Like other towns in Sabah such as Kota Kinabalu city (including Penampang), Tuaran, Papar, Tawau, Kudat and Tenom, Beaufort was one of the major initial Hakka population centres in Sabah and still has a large Hakka minority.

== History ==
Originally set up to help economic development of the interior of Sabah, Beaufort's early prosperity was closely linked to rubber cultivation. During World War II, it was the site of a battle between Japanese and Australian forces in late June 1945.

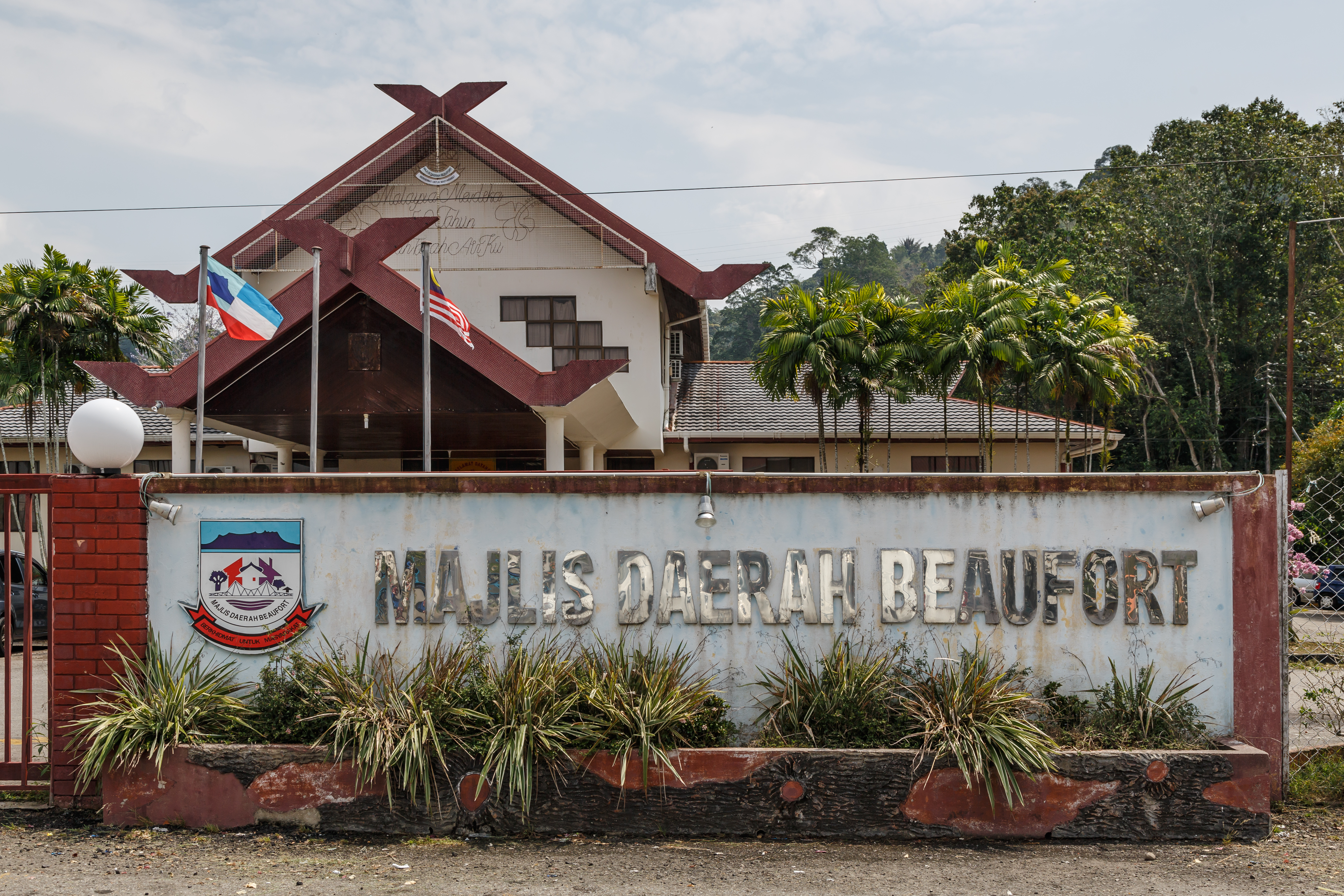
Beaufort District Council building.

== Economy ==
Its current prosperity depends on the booming palm oil industry, rubber, pineapple, mangoes, durian and livestock.

== Transportation ==
Beaufort railway station is a stop on the Sabah State Railway (Jabatan Keretapi Negeri Sabah) line from Tanjung Aru to Tenom. Beaufort is usually visited by tourists for white-water rafting through the nearby Padas Gorge on the Padas River, which is rated as a Grade 2 to 4 river.

== Healthcare ==
Medical services are provided by the 140 bed government hospital which has primary care and basic secondary care services. There are three private practitioners within the town area.

== Shopping ==
The open-air market, locally known as tamu, is held weekly from Friday evening until Saturday afternoon. Local produce such as fresh fruits, vegetables, fresh meat and live poultry are sold.

There is a recently developed shopping area which includes superstore branches.

== Cuisine ==
Beaufort is also known in Sabah for its local cuisine called ambuyat. Sweet Sambal bambangan is also a popular option, as well as other local dishes such as tapai manis, jelurut, bingka, rojak, soto, nasi ayam special, cendol pulut, satay, mamak foodstuffs and a Chinese noodle dish called Beaufort Mee, served either dry or with soup. It is also famous for its Beaufort oranges, which are featured as three large sculptures in the centre of the town.

== Sister cities ==
As designated by Sister Cities International, Beaufort is a sister city of:

- (United States) Beaufort, North Carolina, 2013
