= Long Mio =

Village in Sabah, Malaysia

- Village
- Location within Borneo
- Coordinates: 4°25′59″N 115°42′52″E
- Country: Malaysia
- State: Sabah

Long Mio is a village in the district of Sipitang, in the state of Sabah, Malaysia.
