= Magunatip =

Malaysian and Indonesian traditional dance

Magunatip dance
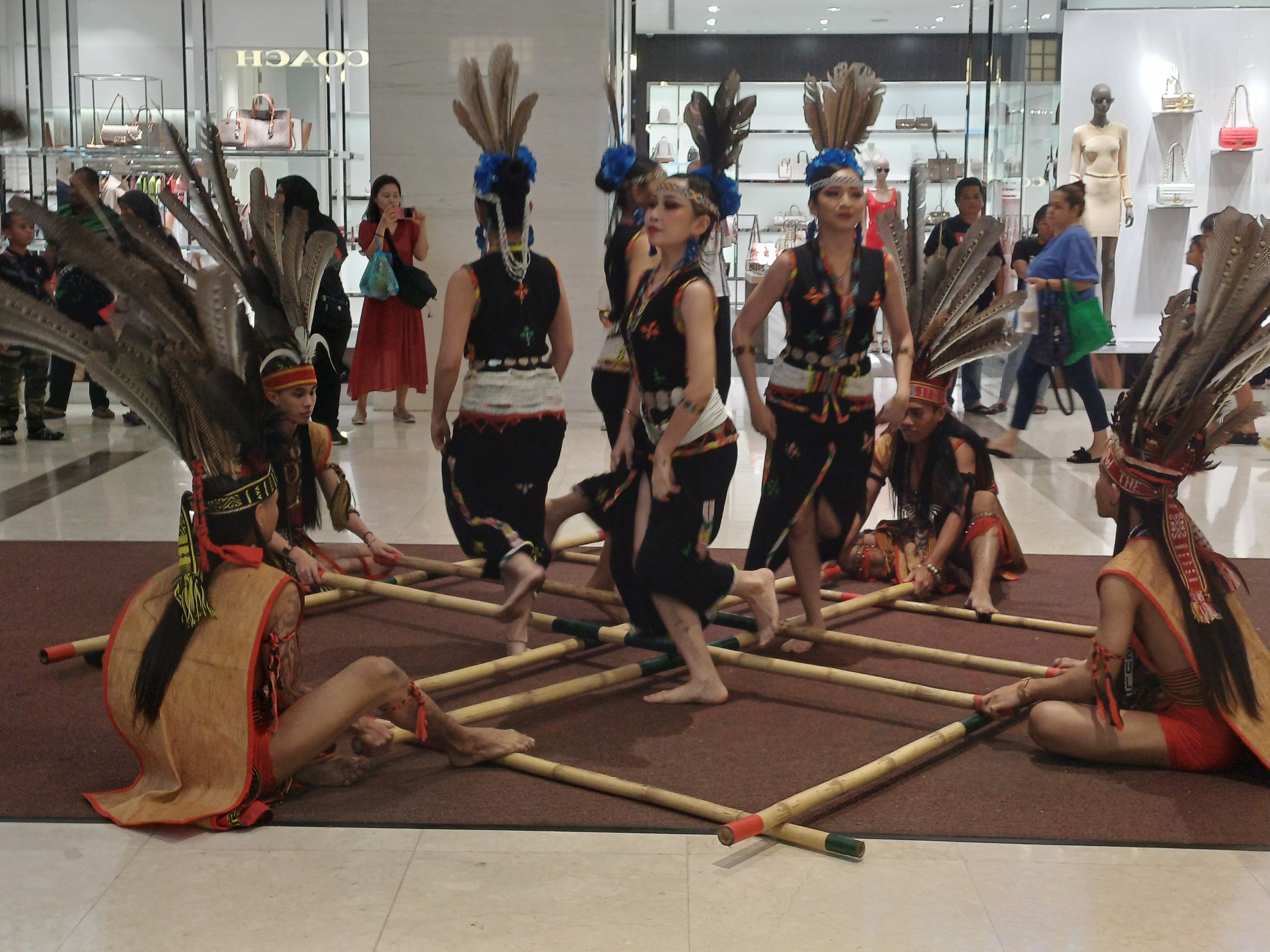
- Four female dancers dancing the Magunatip with the male controlling the bamboo movement accompanied by a traditional musical ensemble at the Imago KK Times Square in Kota Kinabalu District of Sabah.
- Native name: Magunatip (Malaysian Muruts), Lalatip (Indonesian Muruts)
- Etymology: Magunatip/Lalatip (dance) in the Murutic languages
- Genre: Traditional, folk
- Instrument(s): Bamboo stick, gongs, and drum
- Inventor: Murut people
- Origin: Sabah, Malaysia, and North Kalimantan, Indonesia

The Magunatip, Magunatib or Lalatip dance is a traditional energetic dance of Murut ethnic groups living in the inlands of Tenom, Keningau, Nabawan (formerly Pensiangan), several other districts within the interior division of Sabah, Malaysia, as well as North Kalimantan, Indonesia. The word "magunatip" comes from the word "atip" which means to press between two surfaces. Specifically, it refers to the act of pinching the two surfaces of the bamboo stick, which is used as the main instrument in this dance. Magunatip dancers require high skill and agility to dance across the bamboo sticks ("atipan") struck together simultaneously to produce the sound and rhythm of the dance.

Typically, the magunatip dance does not require any musical accompaniment since the sound of the bamboo being played already creates a rhythm and beat. In the past, the dance was performed to welcome the returning of Murut warriors after their successful ngayau (headhunting) traditions. Since the abolishment of headhunting throughout the British and Dutch periods, the dance is performed to welcome guests as part of the ethnic cultural ceremonies.

In 2012, magunatip was listed as an intangible cultural heritage of Malaysia in the category of Intangible Heritage Object Categories under the Department of National Heritage. In 2017, Indonesia listed the lalatip dance of Bulungan, Malinau, Nunukan, and Tana Tidung regencies of North Kalimantan as an intangible cultural heritage of the republic. Both the Malaysian federal and Sabah state governments including the Indonesian central and North Kalimantan provincial governments have declared the dance, its music, and traditional clothing as a national heritage which includes the ritual processes and tools that are classified as the Murut tangible and intangible cultural heritage.

== Clothing ==
Costumes made from bark obtained from the Aputul tree (artocarpus elasticus) will be worn by male performers with the male attire is referred to as babaru puputul, a sleeveless bark jacket, and is complemented by loincloths known as avah puputul. In the language of the Murut ethnic community, the headgear is a hat called lalandau that is adorned with feathers from the Asian koel (sewah tahu) bird, which are referred to as tuwou feathers. The lalandau will be fastened with an embroidered fabric to ensure its stability and prevent it from dislodging during dance to ensure the headpiece is secure.

The attire for female performers comprises a pinongkoloh accompanied by a waist accessory referred to as pipirot which is divided into two categories of the basic pipirot, while an alternative version is known as pipirot linggit, indicating a belt crafted from iron or silver. The female headpieces feature diverse adornments, such as the salupai which is a beaded headdress. It will be attached to the forehead of the female dancer, with a dangling bun ornament referred to as sinikot situated behind it with tuwou feather adornments will be attached to the dancer's hairstyle with an addition of sisingan, or dangling beaded earrings.

== Movements ==
The magunatip begins with the dancers hopping, stepping, and sliding their feet precisely in and out of clapping bamboo poles without getting caught; the dancers must time their jumps instantly with the rhythmic striking of the bamboo poles. Skilled performers usually execute the rapid stepping patterns while completely blindfolded. According to customs, the dance is first performed by female dancers, while the male plays the bamboo. They then switch roles with the dance, which usually takes five to seven minutes, and the number of dancers is between six and ten people, with four or six people to play the bamboo while the others are dancers, depending on the bamboo size.

== Functions ==
The dance is performed during special occasions, especially in welcoming guests to the Murut homeland. Apart from that, this dance is also performed at certain Murut occasions such as:

- Magintan Taduk ceremony: A ceremony to worship the spirit of rice.
- Mansilad ceremony: A ceremony to heal the sick.
- Masayau ceremony: A ceremony to worship the spirits.
- Titikas ceremony: A ceremony to gather people.

== In the 21st century ==
=== International performances ===
In 2025, a local National-type Chinese secondary school (SMJK) from Tenom District, which represents the traditional magunatip dance of Sabah, wins the overall championship at the 26th International Istanbul Harman Folk-Dance Music Festival and Competition held in Turkey.
