= Murut people =

Indigenous ethnic group of Borneo

Murut people Muruts
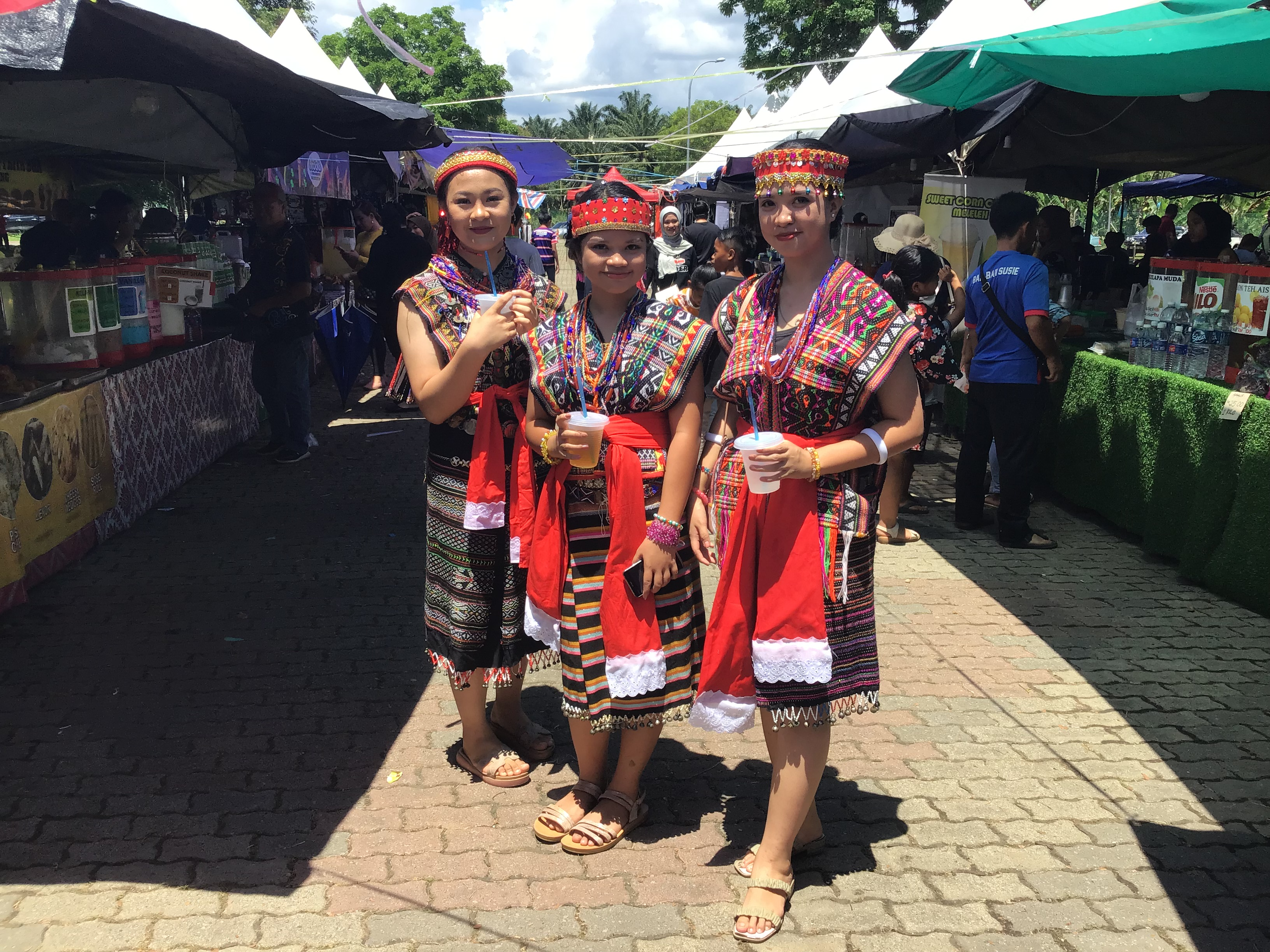
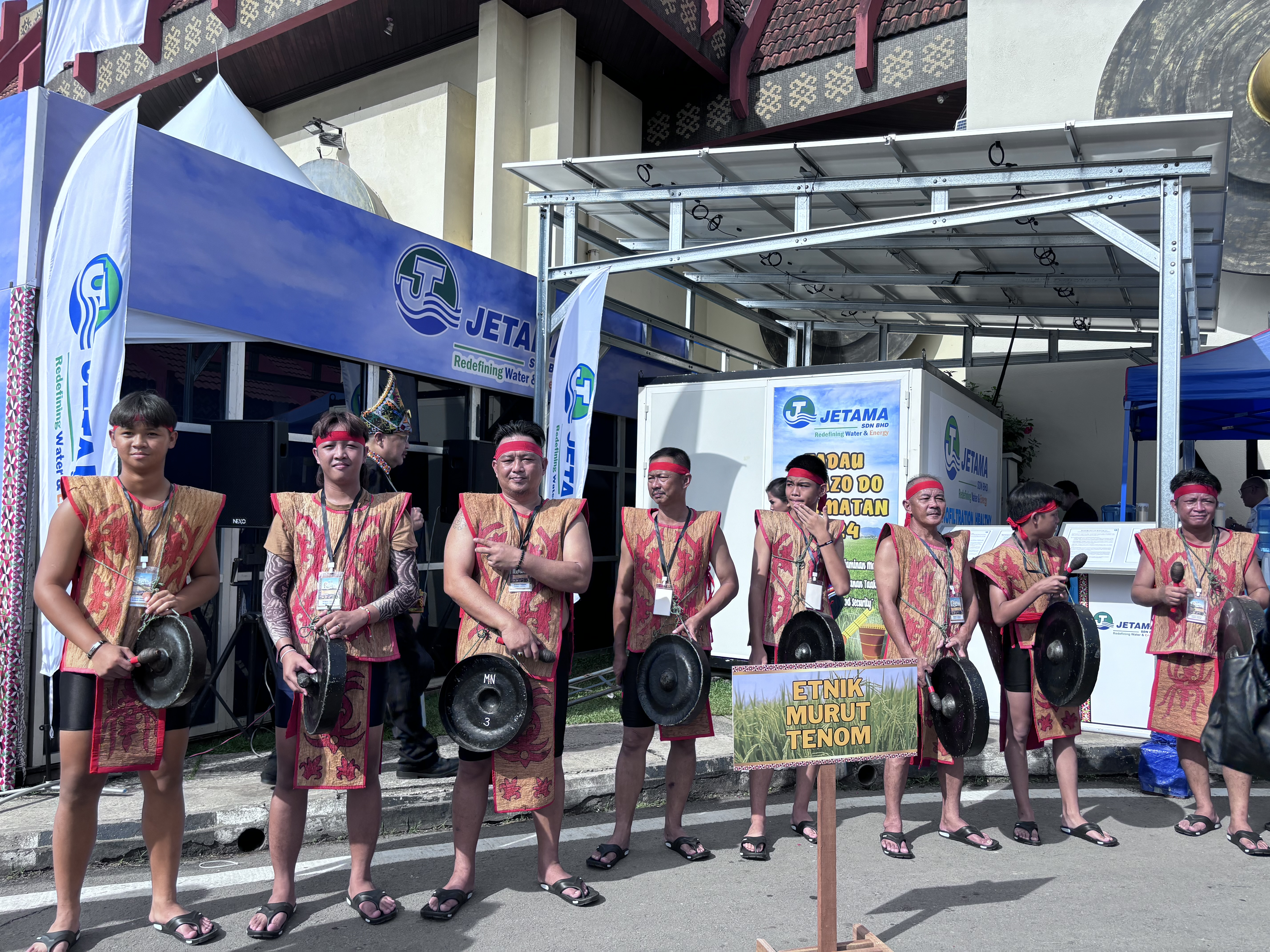
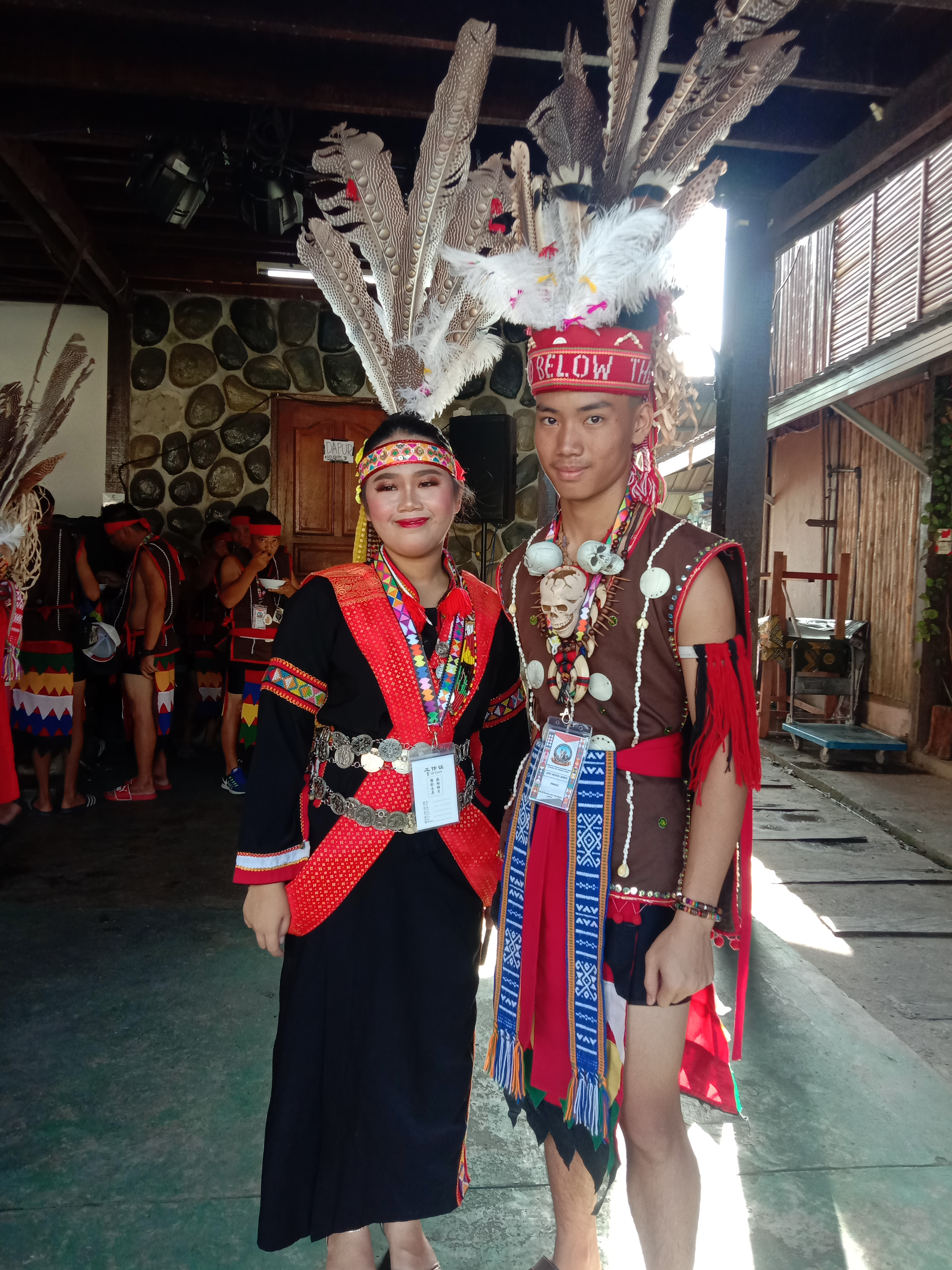
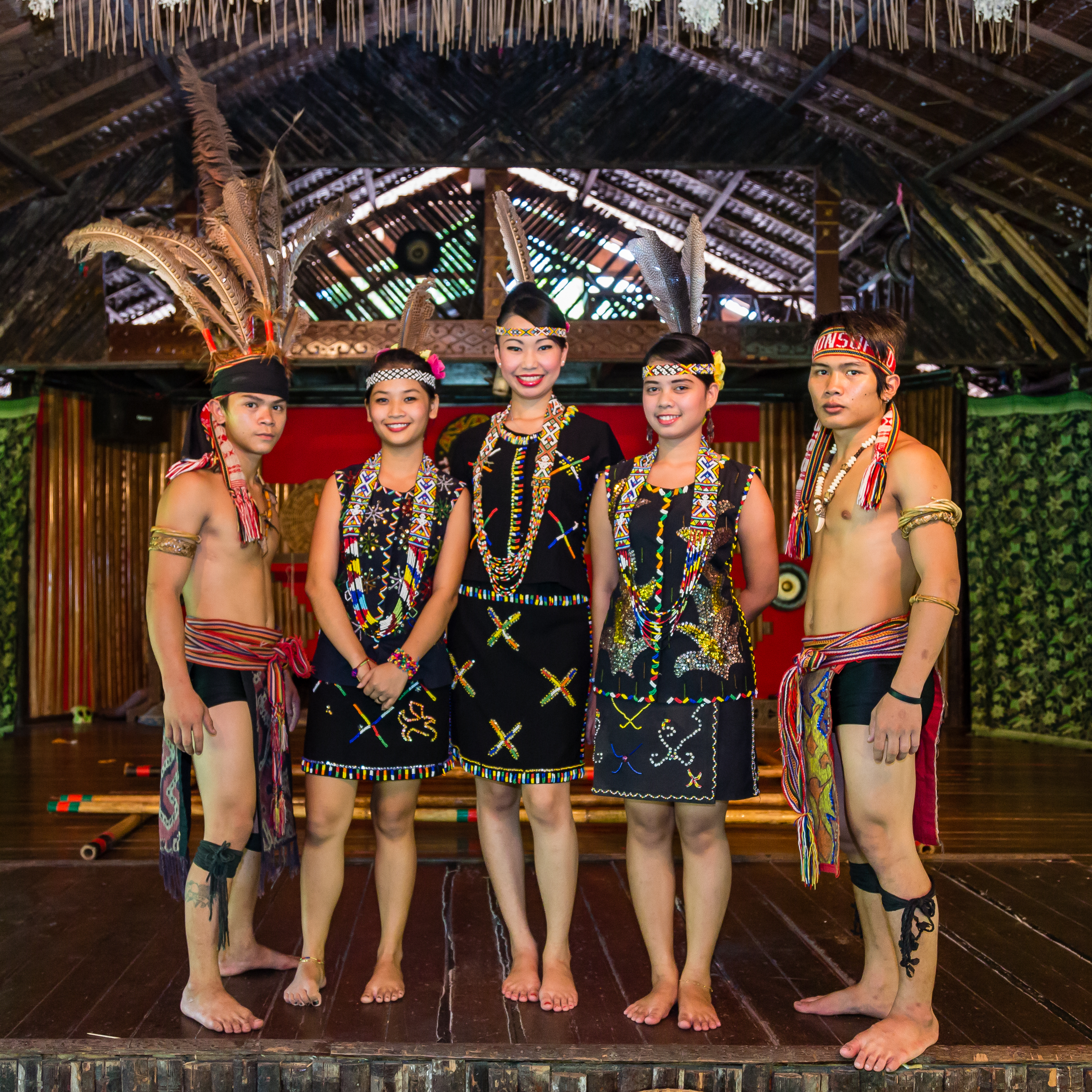
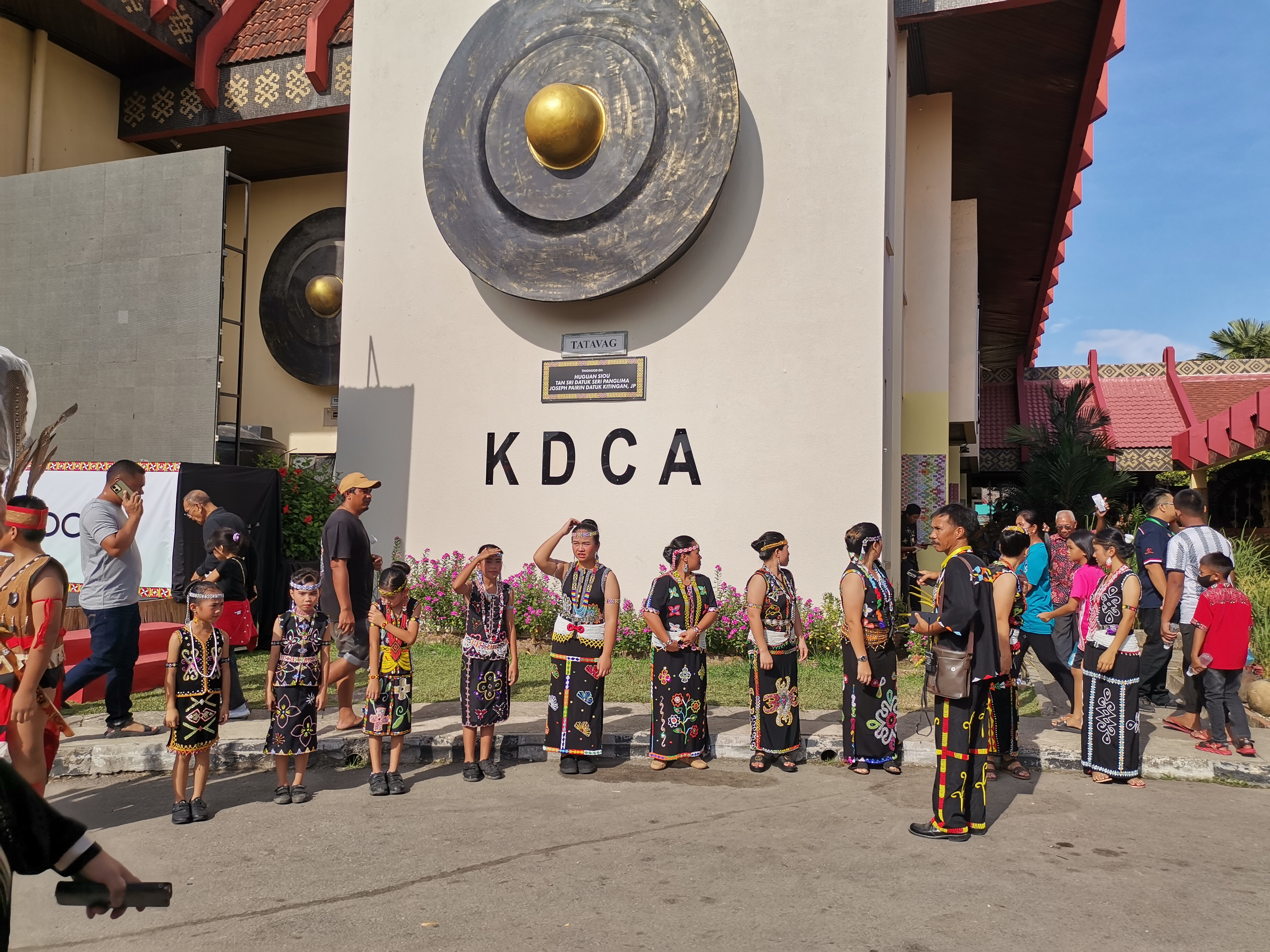
- From top right and left to bottom of several Sabah Murut sub-ethnic in their traditional costumes: Tahol Murut males of Tenom District, Bookan Murut females of Sook, Keningau District, Nabaai Murut of lowland Keningau District, Paluan Murut of Nabawan and Sipitang districts, and Timugon Murut of the lowland Tenom Valleys

Total population
- 6.4% of 51.9% Sabah Bumiputeras (2025) ≈112,900 (2010) (Malaysia)

Regions with significant populations
- Malaysia (Sabah, Sarawak, Labuan); Indonesia (North Kalimantan); Brunei (Temburong District)

Languages
- Murutic, Dusun (secondary language especially spoken by those resident in Keningau district acting as a lingua franca with the Dusun community); Malaysian (Sabah Malay dialect) and Sabahan English (Malaysian Muruts), Indonesian (Indonesian Muruts), and Brunei Malay (Bruneian Muruts)

Religion
- Christianity (majority Protestant, some Catholic) (70%), Islam (Sunni) (28%) and Animism (Traditional religion) (2%)

Related ethnic groups
- Austronesian peoples; Tidung; Lun Bawang/Lundayeh; Sino-Murut; Kadazan; Dusun; Rungus; Paitan; Bisaya; Dayak

The Murut people or simply the Muruts is the collective name of an Austronesian ethnic group indigenous to Sabah and Sarawak in Malaysia as well as North Kalimantan in Indonesia and Temburong District in Brunei. Within Sabah, they primarily live in the Interior Division, primarily in the districts of Nabawan (formerly Pensiangan), Tenom, Keningau, Sipitang and Beaufort and some are also found in the Sandakan and Tawau divisions, namely in the Tongod, Kinabatangan as well as Tawau districts. Within Sarawak, the Muruts are found within Lawas district in Limbang division, as well as in the Federal Territory of Labuan. Within North Kalimantan, the Muruts reside within both the Nunukan and Malinau regencies.

The Murut ethnic term between both Sabah and Sarawak carries different meanings based on its respective administration classification, where different categorisations are also present in both Indonesia and Brunei. They constitute an indigenous ethnic community comprising 29 distinct sub-ethnic groups dwelling within the northern inland territories of Borneo. Originally pagan-animist, a majority of them have converted to Protestantism, while the remainder either adhere to other branches of Christianity (predominantly Roman Catholicism) or to Islam, or else remain with their traditional religion. The Muruts in Sabah are generally referred to as "Northern Muruts", while in Brunei, Sarawak, and North Kalimantan, the Muruts consist of "Southern Muruts".

Characterised by their rich cultural diversity, the Murutic languages form a linguistic family encompassing approximately half a dozen closely intertwined Austronesian languages. Murut populations exhibit dispersion in Malaysia's Sabah and the northern part of Sarawak as well as Labuan, in the country of Brunei and the Indonesian North Kalimantan province. Furthermore, the Murut people have close connections with the Tidung, who historically inhabited Borneo's east coast region that underwent processes of Islamisation and Malayisation.

== Etymology ==
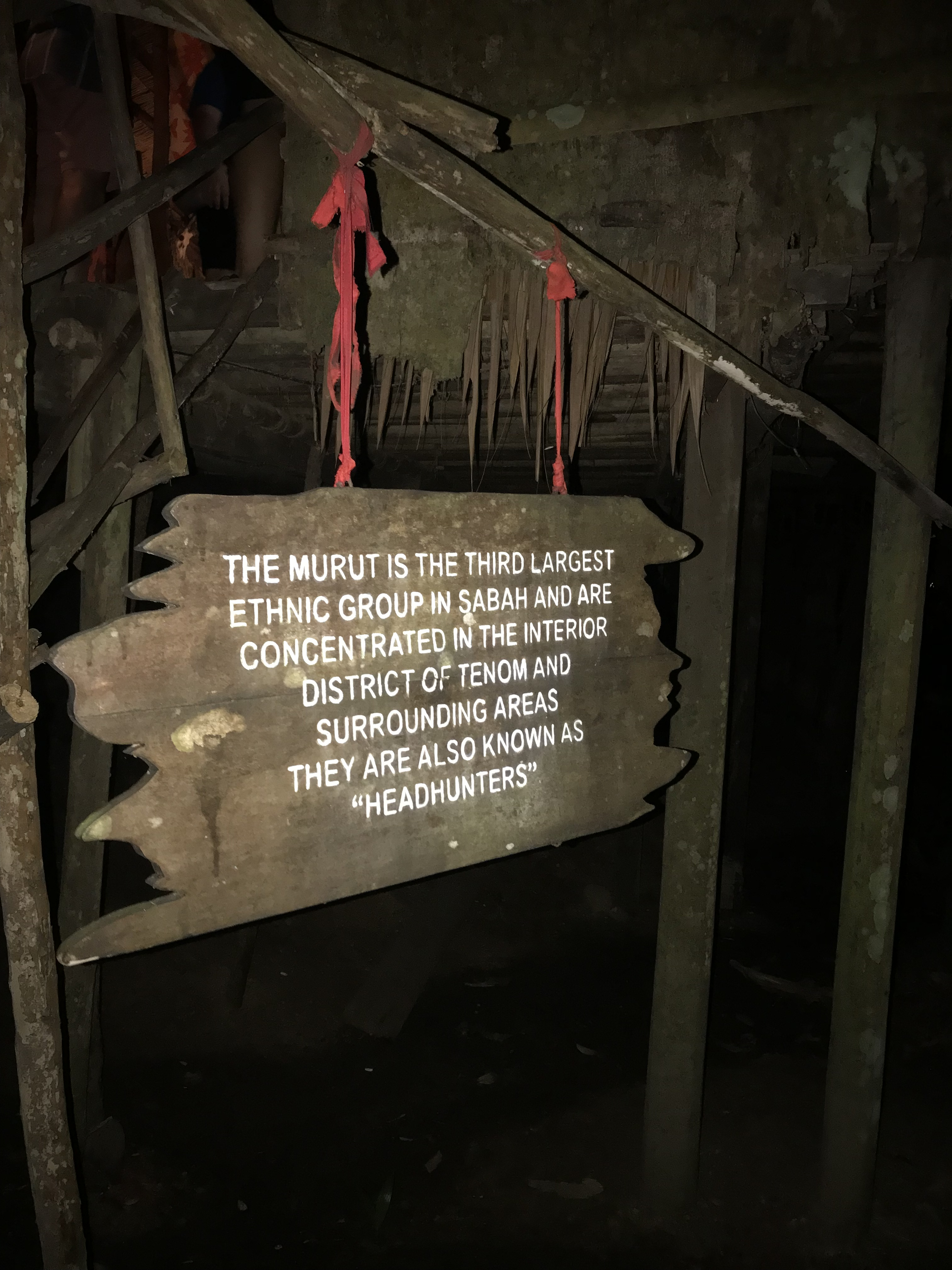
Murut tribe sign at the Mari Mari Cultural Village in Inanam, Kota Kinabalu District

The term Murut originated from the Brunei Malay ethnic classification term throughout the thalassocracy of the Sultanate of Brunei administration on the western coasts. It is believed to have originated from the Old Malay word turut—ed, which carries the meaning of "to follow", "to move" or "to go" in the English language since the Murut tribe itself based on its origin history was driven from the interior upriver to land further down. Among the earliest translations is the Malay-English dictionary written by British colonial administrator, diplomat and writer John Crawfurd in 1852, where he described the Muruts as the name of a wild tribe in the north-eastern part of Borneo island. Murut is also another form originated from the Bajau word belud, meaning hill. English historian, novelist and travel writer Owen Rutter further described in his writings:

The pagans of British North Borneo are divided into two main tribes, which are given the distinguishing names of Murut and Dusun. These names are however never used by the tribes themselves, but appear to have been applied to them by the Mohammedans invaders (Bajau and Malay). The term Murut is derived from the Bajau word of belud which means "hill" and Dusun is the Malay word for "orchard". So that Orang Murut and Dusun respectively mean "people of the hills" and "people of the orchards".

— Owen Rutter through his descriptions of both the Dusun and Murut in The Pagans of North Borneo, 1927

Throughout the British and Dutch period, the Muruts, especially those living on the side of the Raj of Sarawak and Dutch Borneo (Moeroet), are grouped into the larger Dayak umbrella classification through numerous writings, although they are distinct ethnic groups within the broader term. In Sabah, the Murut term is used to jointly describe the various Murut sub-ethnics, such as the Alumbis, Baucan (Bookan), Binta, Kolor (Kolod, Akolod, or Okolod), Nabai (Nabay), Paluan, Sumambuq (Semambu), Serudong (Serudung), Tagal, Tangara (Tenggara/Tangala), and Timugon. The Muruts of Sabah have been categorised as "Northern Muruts", while "Southern Muruts" is used by anthropologists to describe Muruts living within Sarawak, North Kalimantan of Indonesia, and Brunei. In Sarawak, the Lun Bawang (known as Lundayeh in Sabah) tribe are often described as Muruts, which is also sometimes extended to include the Kelabits. (Note: In Sarawak, the Lun Bawang ethnic group (known as Lundayeh in Sabah) are categorised as Muruts, where they share a similar lifestyle and language with another Sarawak ethnic group, the Kelabit, which includes their methods of cultivating hill rice (tana luun) and rice fields (lati ba’). Both the Lun Bawang and Kelabit are further classified within the "Orang Ulu" subgroup within Sarawak's indigenous ethnic classification.) The Muruts are variously referred to with alternative spellings and writings such as Maroot, Marut, Meroot, Merut, Moeroet, Mooroot, Moorut, Morut, Mulut, Murat, and Murút with the literal translation of Murut is "hill people".

== Background history and origin ==
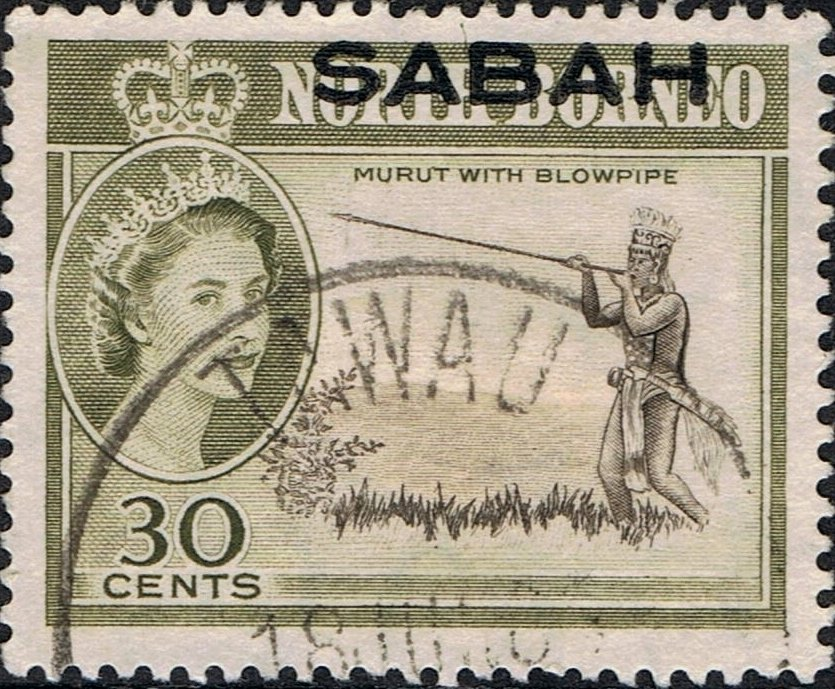
A Murut man with a blowpipe featured in a 1964 30¢ postage stamp of North Borneo (present-day Sabah) with a portrait of Queen Elizabeth II

The Murut are Bornean indigenous people who lived around the hills and plains of Interior Division at the southwestern part of Sabah, particularly in the administrative districts of Nabawan, Tenom, Keningau, Sipitang and its surrounding areas, which extending further south into Indonesian Borneo. There are also scattered populations within Beaufort along the Sapulut and Padas rivers, Tongod, Kinabatangan, and Tawau districts. The Muruts can also be found inhabiting the border areas of Sarawak, (especially around the Lawas and Limbang areas, where they are also referred to as Tagal people), North Kalimantan (traditionally concentrated in Malinau Regency and Nunukan Regency), and Brunei.

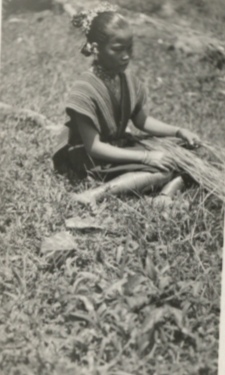
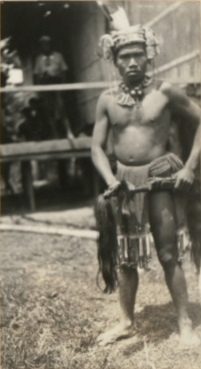
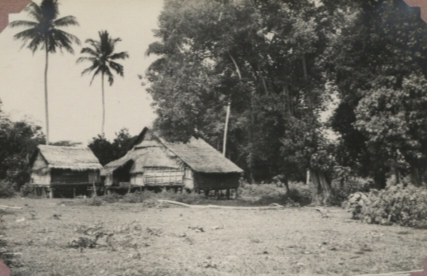
From left to right: Murut female and male of British North Borneo, October 1921
Bottom: A Murut house in Dangalud Village, Keningau District, British North Borneo, c. 1920s

The Murut population in Brunei is mainly found in the sparsely populated Temburong District, but are actually consisting of Southern Murut which is more accurately termed "Lun Bawang". They interacted closely with the Sultanate and were known in the past for contributing to the military might of the latter, although their population within the sultanate has dwindled in recent years. They are defined as one of the seven indigenous groups that are considered to be Bumiputera in Brunei. The Murut in Brunei and Sarawak (Southern Murut) is ethnically and linguistically different from Murut in Sabah (Northern Murut). In Sarawak, the confusing term "Murut" is hence replaced with the term "Lun Bawang", while this has not taken place in Brunei. The Northern Murut are more commonly termed Tagol or Tagal in Brunei and Sarawak, where they are further divided between lowland (Timugon) and highland (Tagol) subgroups, with the Timugon language serving as the lingua franca for the lowland and the Tagol Murut language for the highland.

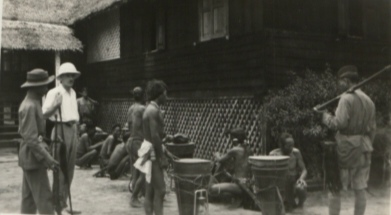
Murut porters with British officials in North Borneo, c. 1921

The Muruts of Sabah are divided between lowland and highland Muruts, with further different classifications, the lowland comprising Binta, Bookan, Dalit, Nabai, Serudong, and Timugon, while the highland constitute the Alumbis, Kolor, Paluan, Salalir, Sapulut, Sumambu, and Tahol. Among the lowland Muruts, the Nabai mostly lived within the plains of Keningau, while the Timugon are within the plains of Tenom. Within Beaufort, the Binta (also known as Sandewad or Sambukid) lived around the Padas River; originally from Tenom, they had migrated to the area due to an epidemic in the past. Another sub-ethnic, the Serudong lived around the Serudong River within the East Coast of Tawau Division and Sibuko Bay.

Among the highland, the Paluan lived along the Padas River and spread to the east of the Dalit River of Sook of Keningau and west of Sipitang. The Dalit within both Dalit and Sook areas of Keningau and along the Pegalan River. In the north of the Rundum area and the Tagol River, another sub-ethnic of the Tahol, the Rundum, lived within the area. The main Tahol lived around the areas of Ulu Bole, Kemabong, Tenom, and Tomani, while the Kolor are within the Ulu Bole and Sipitang areas, the Sapulut are within south Sook and the Sapulut River, and the Pensiangan (also known as the Lagungan) are within Sapulut and spread across southeast Serudong and the Kalabakan River. Another highland Murut, the Tengara, are spread across the Ulu Kinabatangan River, to the western area of the Ulu Kuamut River. Within the federation of Malaysia, the Muruts are also considered as one of Sabah Bumiputeras.

Throughout the British administration, in 1915, a protracted drought caused widespread crops failure and subsequent lack of food production among the Murut community in North Borneo, where the situation constrained by the taxation system introduced by the British led the Murut spiritual leaders to claim the problem was caused by their ancestral spirits angered towards the systems. A Murut community leader named Ontoros Antanom (Antanum) received unwavering support from the chiefs and villagers from around Keningau, Tenom, Pensiangan (present-day Nabawan), and his stronghold of Rundum, where he further led the Rundum uprising against the North Borneo Chartered Company (NBCC) but was killed during the fighting against the company forces in Selangit River near Pensiangan.

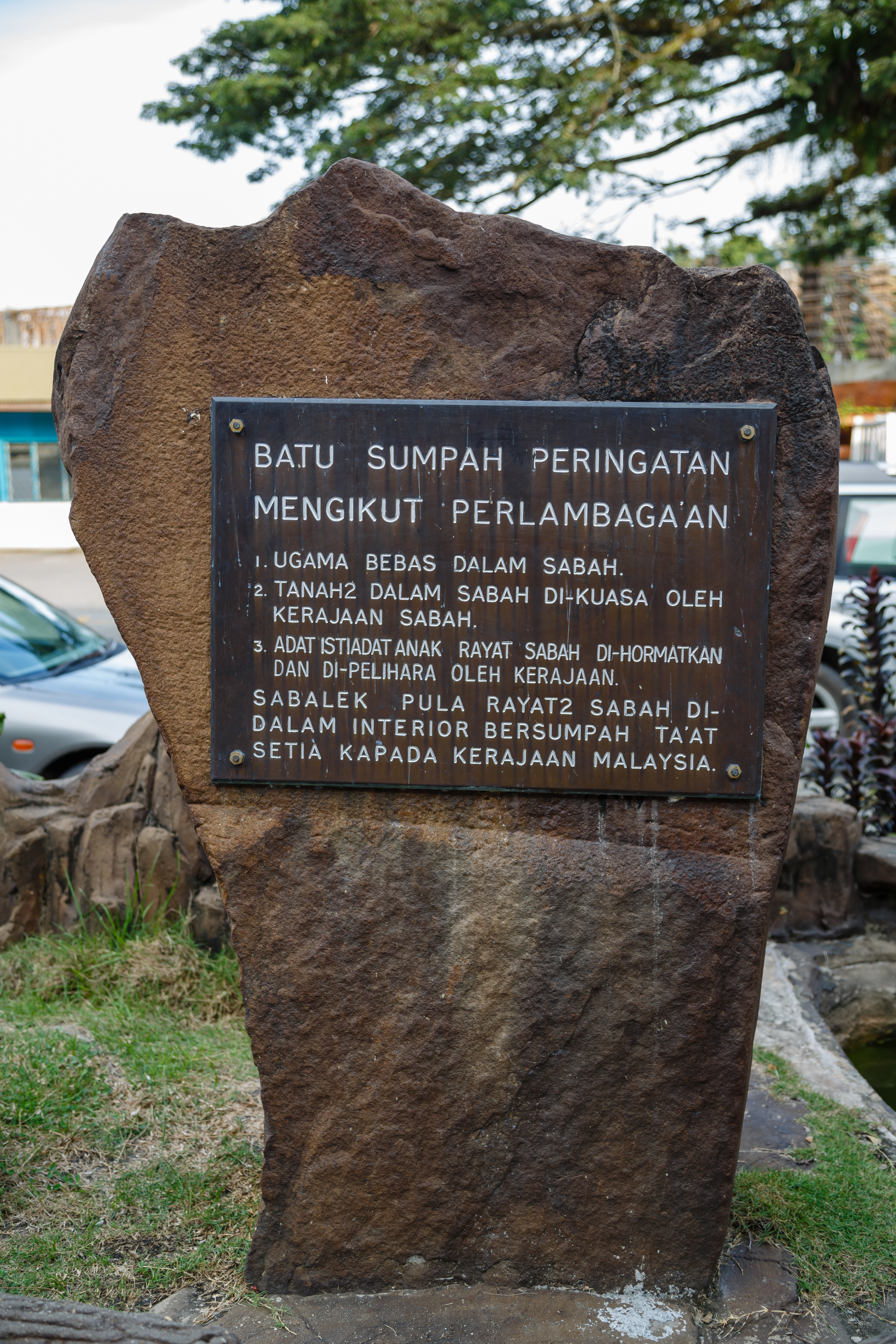
The Oath Stone in interior Sabah of Keningau District, an oath from the indigenous Dusuns and Muruts with the federal government of Malaysia following the Malaysia Agreement for the latter to respect traditional values of the indigenous and guarantee their freedom of religion, which in return the indigenous population will be loyal to the federal government. The stone was the idea of adviser of the United Sabah Dusun Association (USDA), Samson Sundang Gunsanad

The Muruts are represented through their respective sub-ethnic associations, which are further jointly united through the primary Murut ethnic association. Prior to the formation of the federation of Malaysia, the Muruts together with the Dusuns stipulated various condition through the 20-point agreement for the North Borneo Crown to be part of the federation, constitute several terms from the indigenous Dusuns and Muruts for the federal government to guaranteed their rights within the federation for them to continuously living in peaceful and their rights be respected and honoured by the federal government by maintaining freedom of religion with no state religion for North Borneo, all lands in the territory should be under the North Borneo government, and the federal need to regard and respecting traditional indigenous values, to ensure continuous peace and loyalty from the indigenous community.

=== "Mainland Southeast Asia" origin theory ===
Several theories suggested that the Murutic peoples arrived in the northern part of Borneo through a first-wave migration by a land bridge from mainland Southeast Asia when the island was connected within the Sundaland region before they were pushed further inland when the second-wave migration occurred by the Dusunic-speaking peoples. The present Murut, Kadazan, and Dusun peoples represent the direct descendants of those inhabitants, with early researchers also finding a closer relationship between the Murutic and Dusunic peoples of Sabah and some of the neighbouring indigenous ethnic groups in the Philippines, Taiwan, and mainland Southeast Asia. Based on genetic studies on the Bornean agriculturalist ethnic groups, the Murut are more closely related to the other agriculturalist ethnics of Dusun and Lundayeh, as well as to the Amis of Taiwan and the Kankanaey tribe in the Cordillera Administrative Region of the Philippines, including the Lebbo' Dayak in East Kalimantan of Indonesia, than to the indigenous nomadic hunter-gatherer ethnic groups of Punan Batu in East Kalimantan and Mlabri of Thailand and Laos.

== Murut sub-ethnic groups by districts ==
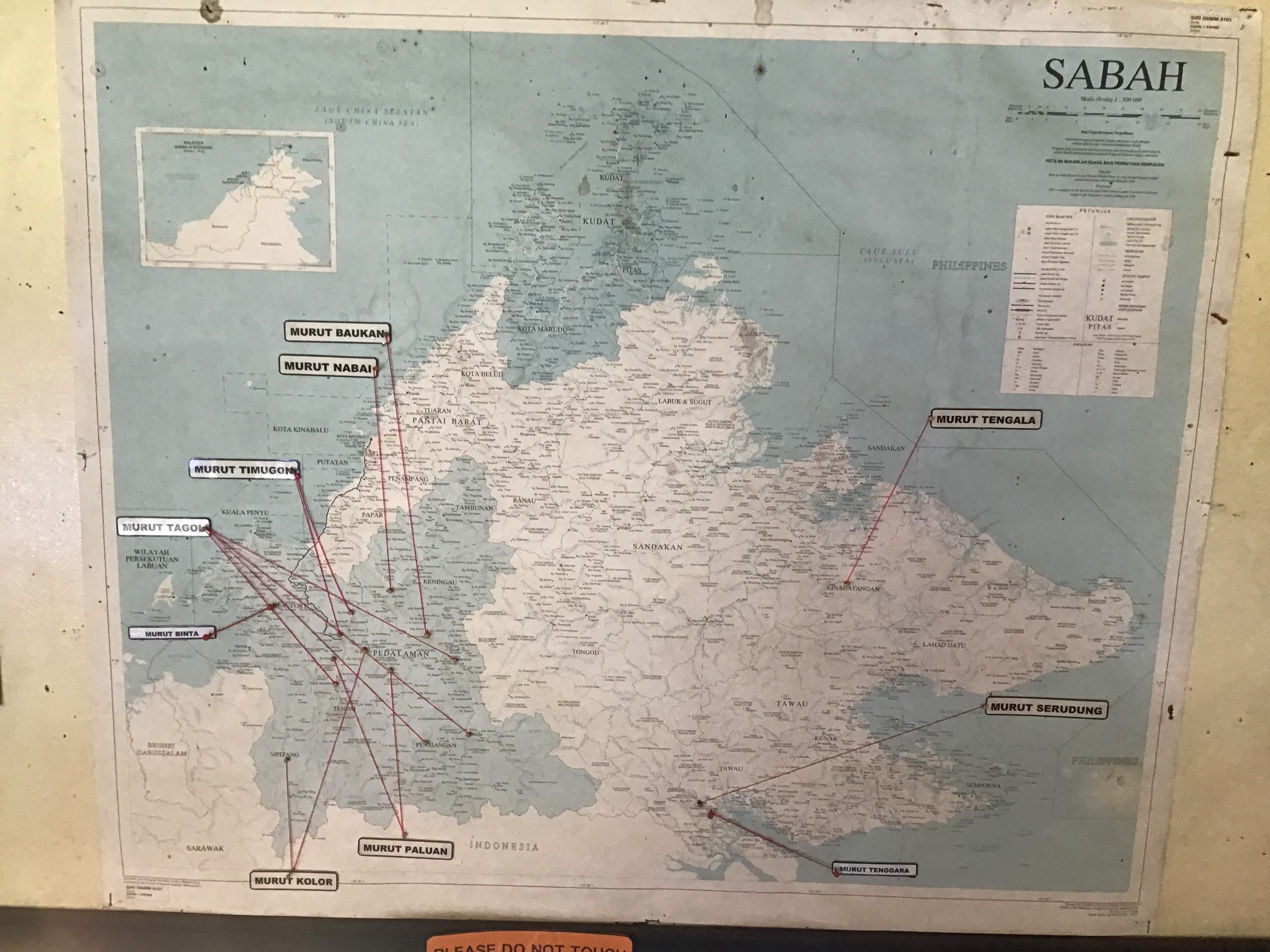
(Left) Percentage of population of Murut by state constituencies in Sabah, according to the 2020 census
(Right) The map of Sabah describes the locations of some of the Murut sub-ethnics

Within Sabah, the Muruts are further classified into around ten to fourteen sub-ethnics, comprising the lowland Muruts of Binta, Bookan, Dalit, Nabai, Serudong, and Timugon, while the highland constitute the Alumbis, Kolor, Paluan, Salalir, Sapulut, Sumambu, Tahol, and Tangala (Tengara). The lowland Muruts are concentrated within the plains of the districts of Beaufort, Keningau, Tenom, and Tawau, while the highland Muruts are within the inner location around the districts of Kalabakan, Keningau, Nabawan, Sipitang, Tenom, and Tongod.

During the administration of the North Borneo Chartered Company (NBCC), both the Dusun and Murut are the predominating indigenous tribes of British North Borneo. Both are similarly classed in groups and subdivisions; the Muruts of the plains consisting the Keningau Muruts, Tenom Muruts, and Muruts in the valleys of lower Padas River while the hill Muruts consisting the Paluans on the hill of Padas River in Tenom area, towards the eastern area of Dalit River of Sook, Keningau and Sipitang District, the Dalit Muruts of Dalit and Sook valleys, the Rundum Muruts of Tagul River spread towards the neighbouring Dutch border, the Tagals (also Rundum Muruts) who have settled around the Ulu Bole area of Sipitang where they are known as Tagal Muruts, the Kolor Muruts, formerly living within Dutch territory of northern Kalimantan before migrating to the Bole area, the Sapulut Muruts who living around the hills south of Sook Plain, Pensiangan (Lagungan) Muruts, closely related to Sapulut Muruts and spread throughout the Dutch border and southeast of Serudong and Kalabakan rivers, the Lundayeh Muruts which reside within the upper waters of Padas River and into Sarawak, and the Kwijau which is distinct from the entire of Murut tribes, also occasionally associated with the Dusun groups. British researcher C. Hudson Southwell describes the differences between the Sarawak and North Borneo Muruts in his work "The structure of the Murut language" in 1949:

The term Murut is applied in Sarawak and North Borneo to different people. In neither case is the name self-applied. The North Borneo "Murut" use either the name Tagal or a local place name in describing themselves, while the Sarawak 'Muruts' call themselves Lun Bawang or Lun Daya.

— C. Hudson Southwell, British researcher, 1949

=== Sub-ethnic groups ===
Languages of Kalimantan, with the Murut sub-dialects are being labelled as Tagal (36), Sembakong (38), Selungai (35), Okolod (36) and Tidung (59)

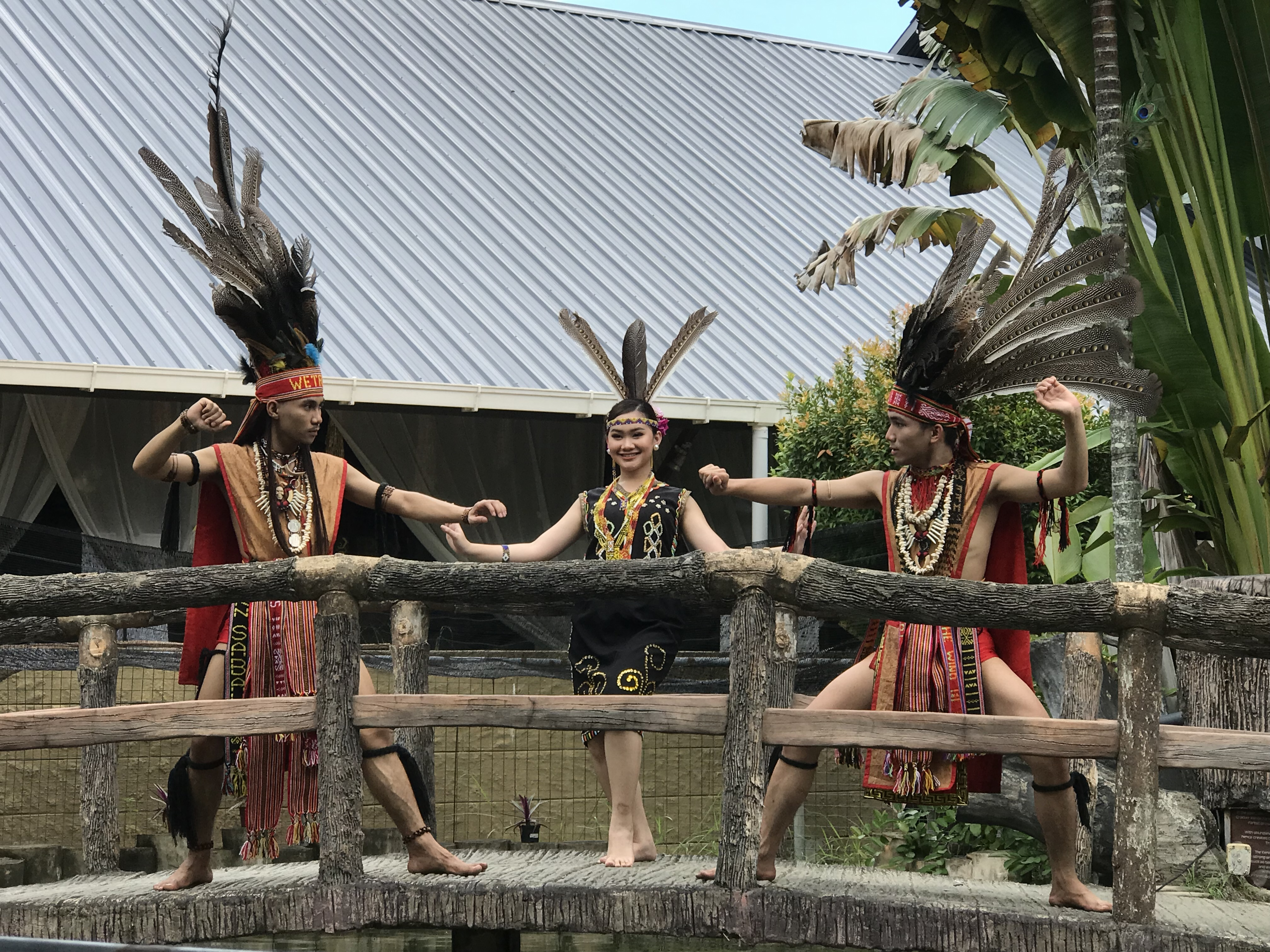
Paluan Murut of Sabah in their traditional attire

The Murut people are divided into three linguistic groups, namely:

- Murutic languages cluster:
  - Okolod (North Kalimantan, Indonesia)
  - Keningau Murut (Keningau District, Sabah, Malaysia)
  - Tagal or Tahol Murut (Sabah, Malaysia and North Kalimantan, Indonesia)
  - Paluan (Sabah, Malaysia)
  - Selungai Murut (North Kalimantan, Indonesia)
  - Timugon Murut (Sabah, Malaysia)
  - Binta Murut (Sabah, Malaysia)
  - Bulusu Murut (North Kalimantan, Indonesia)
  - Tingalan Murut (North Kalimantan, Indonesia)
  - Agabag Murut (North Kalimantan, Indonesia)
- Northern languages cluster:
  - Bookan (Sabah, Malaysia)
- Tidong languages cluster:
  - Tidung people (Tarakan, North Kalimantan, Indonesia)
  - Bulungan people (Bulungan Regency, North Kalimantan, Indonesia)
  - Kalabakan (Sabah, Malaysia)
  - Sembakung Murut (Sabah, Malaysia; North Kalimantan, Indonesia)
  - Serudung Murut (Sabah, Malaysia)

== Culture and society ==
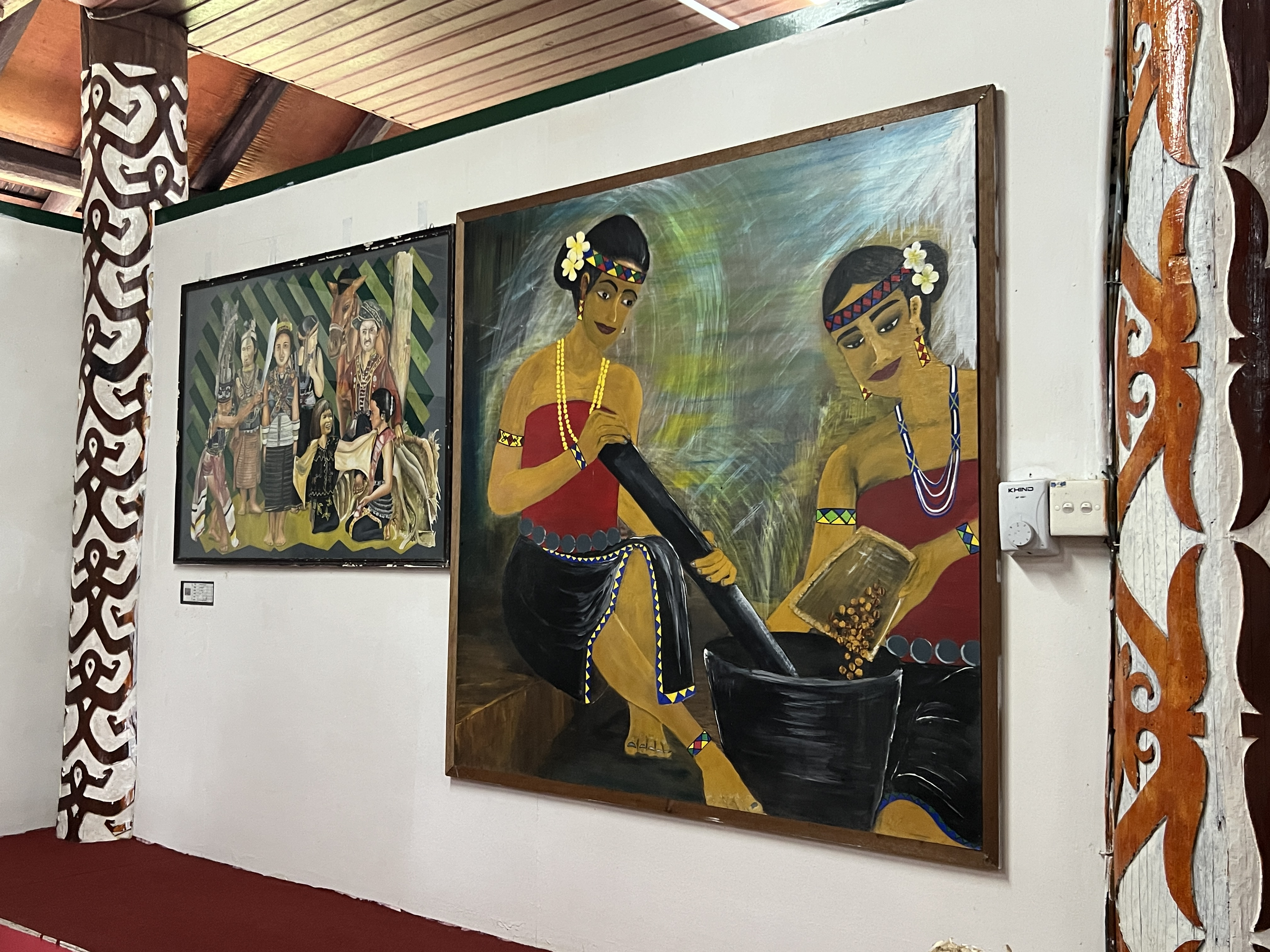
The Murut culture is being described through painting and indigenous arts and designs at the Murut Cultural Centre of Tenom District, Sabah, Malaysia

The Murut were agriculturalists who practised shifting cultivation of hill paddy and tapioca, supplementing their daily diet with hunting and with river fishing. They once live in communal longhouses, usually near rivers, using the water source as their transportation networks. Most have now converted to Christianity, especially the Christian branch of Protestantism, with others adhering to various Christian branches such as Roman Catholic, and some being Muslims, although traditional beliefs are especially strongly maintained by Muruts living in the further deep Bornean jungles in the interior. The culture of the Muruts, where they are known as the "hill people", is rich in warrior traditions and intricate bead art, as well as their agile Magunatip (bamboo dance). Centred in the Nabawan (the former Pensiangan), Tenom, Keningau, and nearby areas such as Sipitang and Beaufort districts, they occasionally hunted with their blowpipe (sapok, sinapok, or sumpit), and celebrated their rich culture through the featurement of various handicrafts, gong music, and their festivals such as the Kalimaran. The Murut Cultural Centre in Tenom District serves as the main centre for all Sabah Murut sub-tribe cultural points, where it serves as a venue for various cultural activities related to the tribe's development and promotion of cultural arts and heritage. Modern hunting and farm/ancestral land protection improvised firearms, such as the bakakuk are commonly used by the indigenous Muruts, where it is also considered "customary" in rural contexts among the indigenous community.

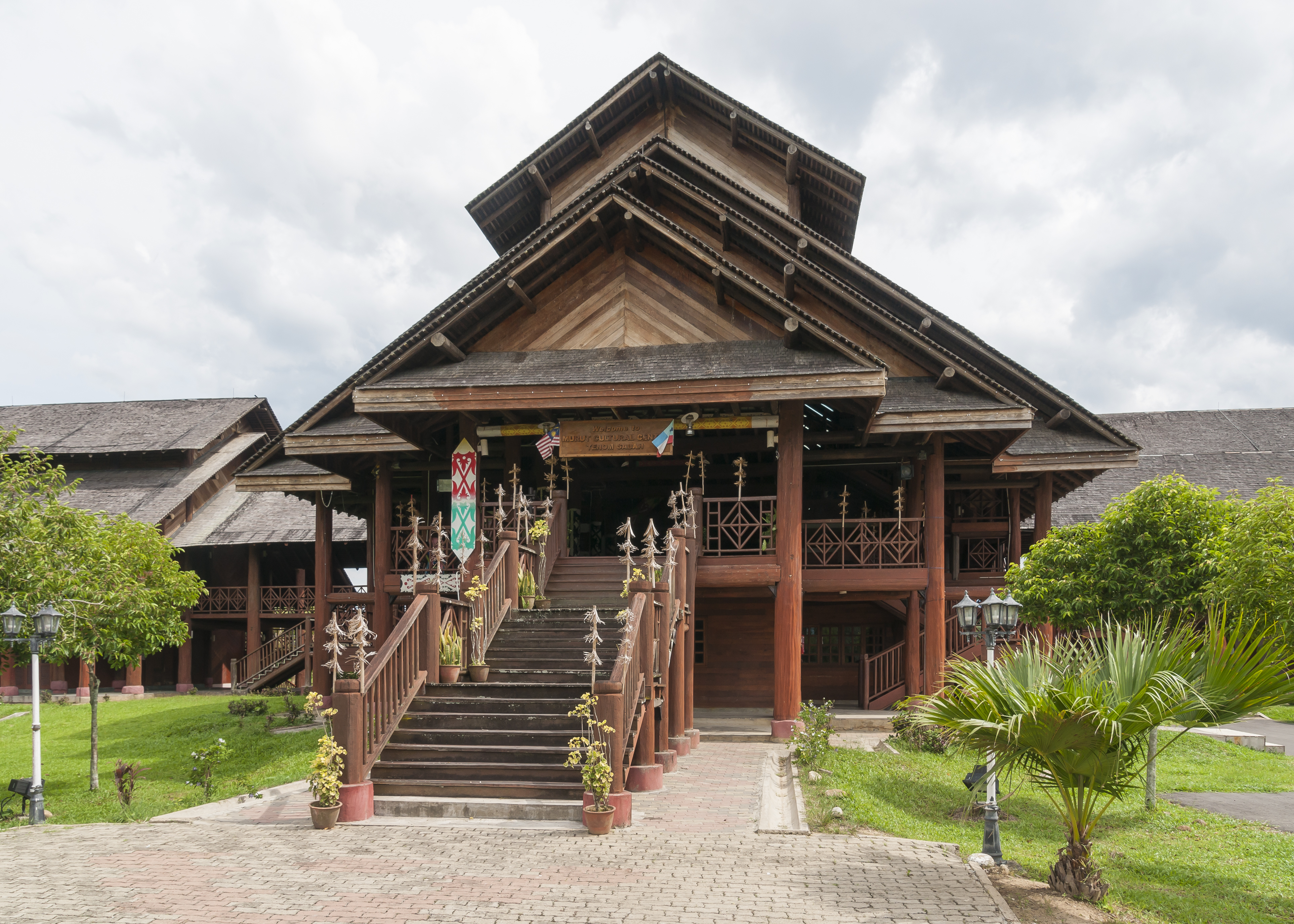
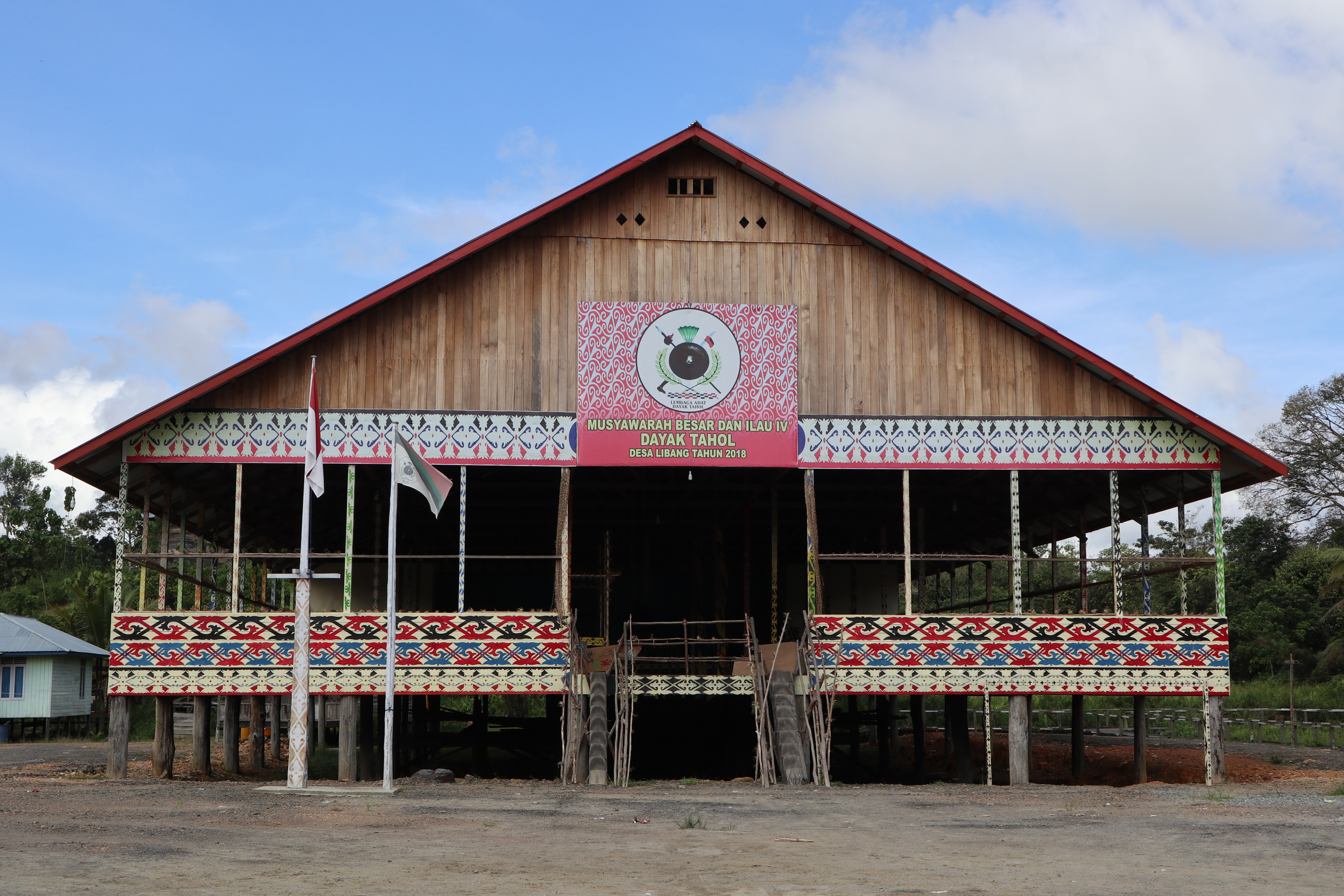
From left to right: Murut Cultural Centre in Pulong Village, Tenom District, Sabah, Malaysia and the Tahol Murut Cultural Centre in Desa Libang, Lumbis, Nunukan, North Kalimantan, Indonesia

The Muruts were the last of North Borneo's ethnic groups to renounce headhunting after the Dusuns and in the past were fearlessly known for such practice. Together with the neighbouring Raj of Sarawak ethnic of Iban, collecting heads of enemies traditionally served a very important role in Murut spiritual beliefs. For example, in the dowry of the Murut culture in the past, a Murut male could only get married after he presented at least one enemy head to the family of the Murut female that he wanted to marry. Murut wedding or funeral feasts can last several days, with ancient Chinese jars holding a prominent status in Murut customs, where the jars, commonly known among Muruts as tajau (pottery), became places of spirits, with larger jars formerly used as coffins. During the harvest festival, which takes place annually in March, the Muruts have their own beauty pageant of Ralaa Kalimaran, often held in areas such as Tenom District, where they also jointly celebrated the Unduk Ngadau in the month of May, which encompasses various ethnicities, including the Murut. Young women (ralaa) of Muruts, and others from the Kadazan, Dusun, and Rungus descent from different districts compete for this title at the KDCA Compound in Penampang District. The beauty pageant is held to commemorate the spirit of Kadazan-Dusun Huminodun, a mythological character of unparalleled beauty who is said to have given her life in exchange for a bountiful harvest for her people. Within the Murut folklore culture and celebration of the Kalimaran festival, the festivity also had an identical origin as the Kadazan-Dusun Huminodun, where the word Ralaa represents a young woman of Murut that was sacrificed, and the woman used to produce various Murut handicrafts such as mats, silaung, and woven Sampoi cloth during her lifetime.

=== Ethnic dance and music ===
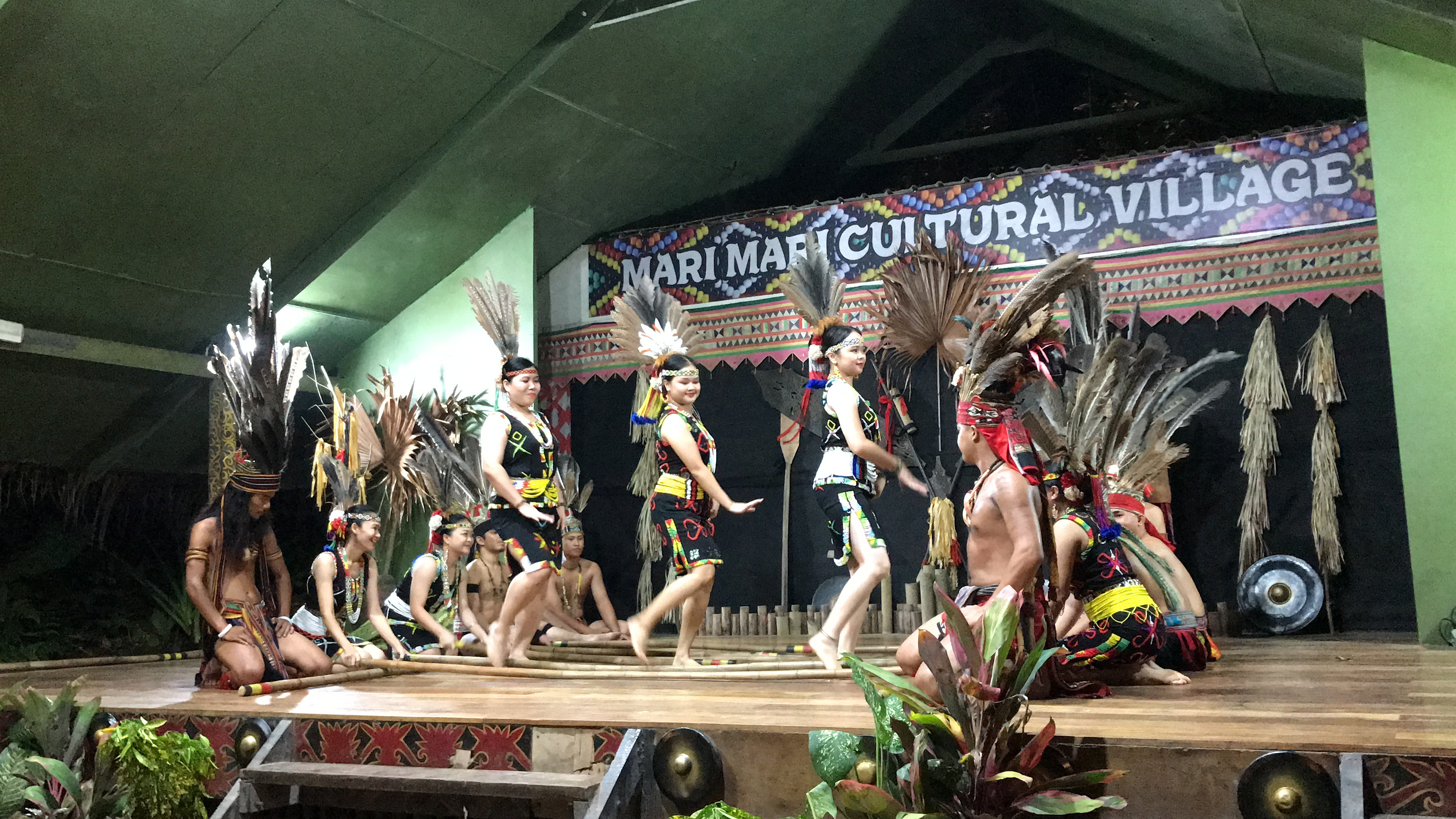
Magunatip dance at the Mari Mari Cultural Village

The main traditional dance for the ethnic especially among Muruts in Keningau, Nabawan, and Tenom districts is the Magunatip, which is derived from the Murut word apit and carries the meaning of "to press between two surfaces". It is an energetic indigenous warrior dance by the interior Nabaai, Paluan, and Timugon Muruts as well as Kwijau Dusun (Kujau) and Tambunan Dusun which has been practised for hundreds of years, with dancers putting their feet in and out between clapping bamboo poles throughout the performances without being trapped. The Tahol Murut in the three districts are also known for their sasayau and alang ra illau dances, the Bookan Murut from Sook, Keningau for their mangalai, the Kolor Murut from Sapulut for their magalai and their Murut version of sumazau, the Nabaai Murut from inner Keningau for their mansayau, the Okolod Murut were originally from Pensiangan (present-day Nabawan) before settled in Sipitang and known for their alang sirung and alang kolod, the Paluan Murut from Sipitang for their ansayau, and the Tangala Murut from Tongod for their tinggung agalai and sayau agumbak.

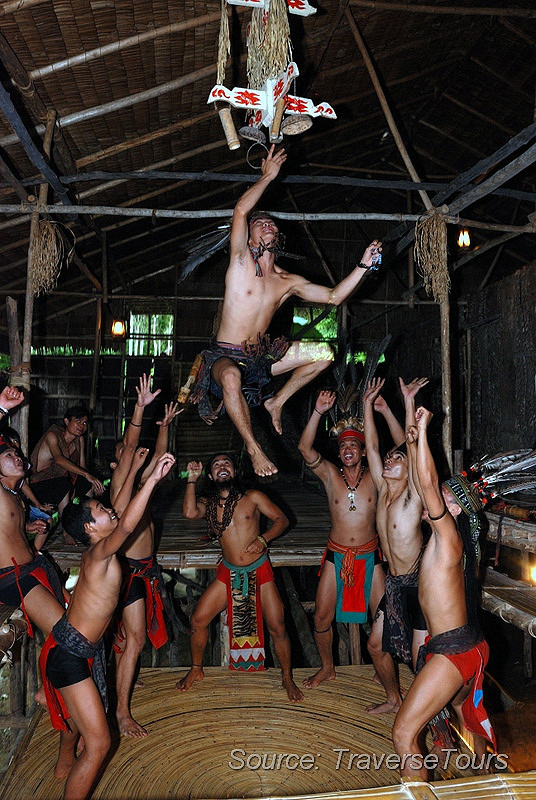
Murut trampoline game of Lansaran

The Lansaran is a Murut traditional game and also categorised as the tribe traditional dance heritage, originating from the Murut word lumasar, which carries the meaning "to soar" or "swing", where both males and females gather in their traditional attire, forming a circle while jumping on the trampoline-like bamboo floor to reach the suspended kinkilat. Popular among the Muruts of Keningau and Tenom, it was usually held in the past to welcome the return of Murut warriors from ngayau who had achieved victory in the battlefield. The Murut also has a musical heritage consisting of various types of agung (tagung in Dusun) ensembles composed of large, hanging, shallow-sided gongs with small differences between back and front diameters, which are more common within the Murutic and Dusunic communities than the Paitanic of northeastern and both the Bajau and Iranun people of the western coast of Sabah. Bamboo was also used by the Muruts as musical instruments to compose songs. Some musical instruments, like the tangkung (similar to that of a guitar, except it has only two strings), are made from wood and are usually played during their leisure time. Sompoton is another instrument for the Muruts, which is also owned by the Dusuns and Kadazans. Kulundi is an instrument associated with the Tangara Muruts of Inarad in Upper Kinabatangan, especially in religious or cultural ceremonies.

=== Ethnic attire ===
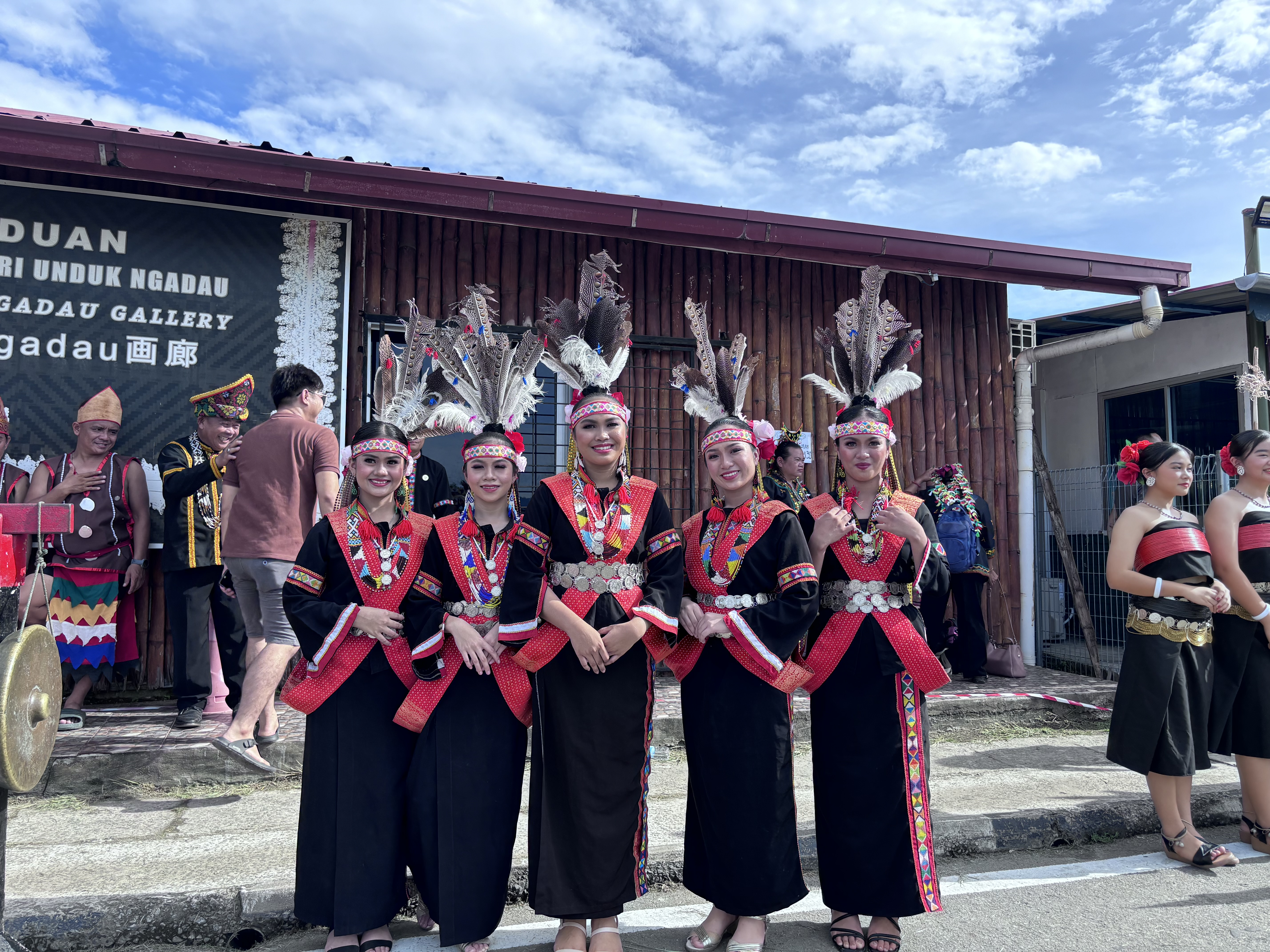
Nabaai Murut females of Sabah in their traditional attire

The traditional ethnic attire of the Muruts is varied according to each subgroup. Black colour are synonyms among the Muruts, similarly to the Dusuns, Kadazans and Rungus. Traditional dress for Murut male was a jacket made of tree bark (Artocarpus tamaran), a red loincloth, and a headdress called lalandau which is usually worn by both male and female which further decorated with the Argus pheasant feathers. Murut female wore a black sleeveless blouse and sarong, which fell just below the knees. Like most of the other indigenous groups in Sabah, the Murut decorated their clothing with distinctive beadwork and also made belts out of old silver coins, another belt made of reddish-brown glass beads plus yellow and blue beads was hung loosely around the waist. The Tahol Murut female dress of pinongkoloh, which is usually in black colour and colourful floral motifs, is further decorated with beads of various unique patterns and designs. It consists of eight components: babaru linantian (black sleeveless shirt made of cotton fabric), tapi' linantian (black long dress), pipirot linggit (belt made of coins), salupai (fine beads), sinikot (dangling headdress consisting of two sets: sinikot taun and sinikot manai), rarangkol (necklace made of round beads known as rarangkol pumping), holong (wrist jewellery) and bungkas (waist decoration or bengkung made of white beads).

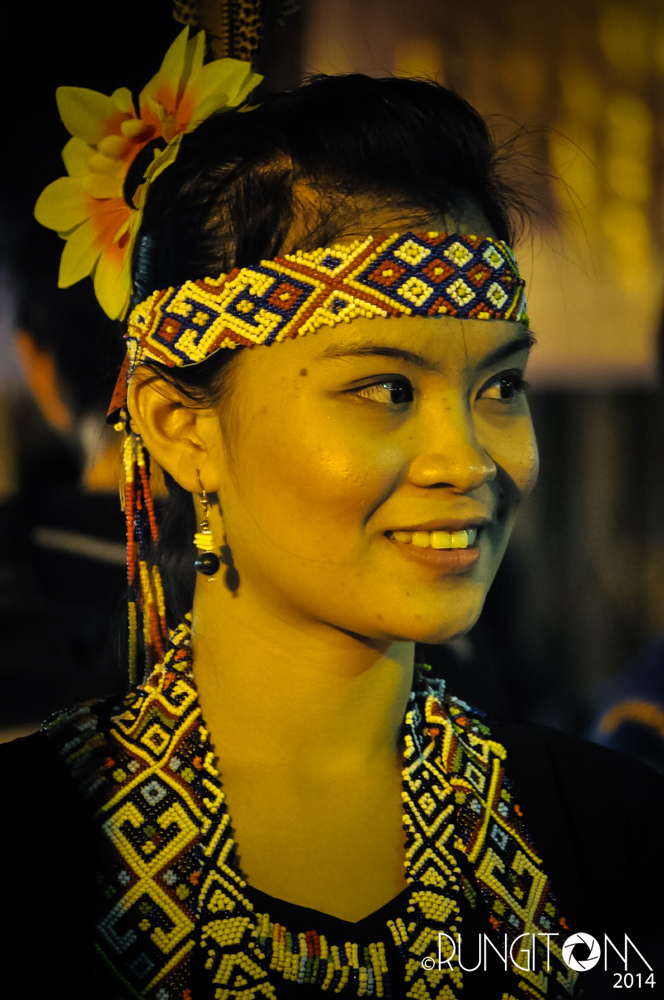
Timugon Murut female of Sabah bead headband motifs

The lalandau headdress in the past used to be the main head cover for Murut male warriors, with each feather's number signifying death and the total number of enemies that had been killed by the wearer. Another head cover, the silaung/siraung or sirung, is used mainly by most Murut sub-ethnics to cover them from rain and sunlight during their agricultural activities. Traditional materials commonly used to produce this craft include bark, rattan, bamboo, bemban (Donax canniformis) and mengkuang (screwpine) leaves, which can be found in the surroundings of the Murut native ranges' homeland. The tavil was once used as a back cover body armour by the Muruts from the blowpipe attack of fellow rivals. In the upper corner of the armour, a string is placed so that it can be tied around the waist, and the surface is woven and decorated with sinusu motifs, which are the most dominant motifs on most tavils found, which seem to be structures in the shape of the armour and are reinforced by vertical and horizontal lines forming a '+' symbol. Several other motifs, including the minato, sunsulit, tinampinak and zigzag. Many beadwork and handicraft pattern motifs of the Muruts also have many similarities with the Punan and Iban of Sarawak. The use of beads among the Muruts are not only considered decorative items but also carry symbolic meanings related to social spiritual beliefs, women's maturity, and their role in the community.

=== Handicrafts ===
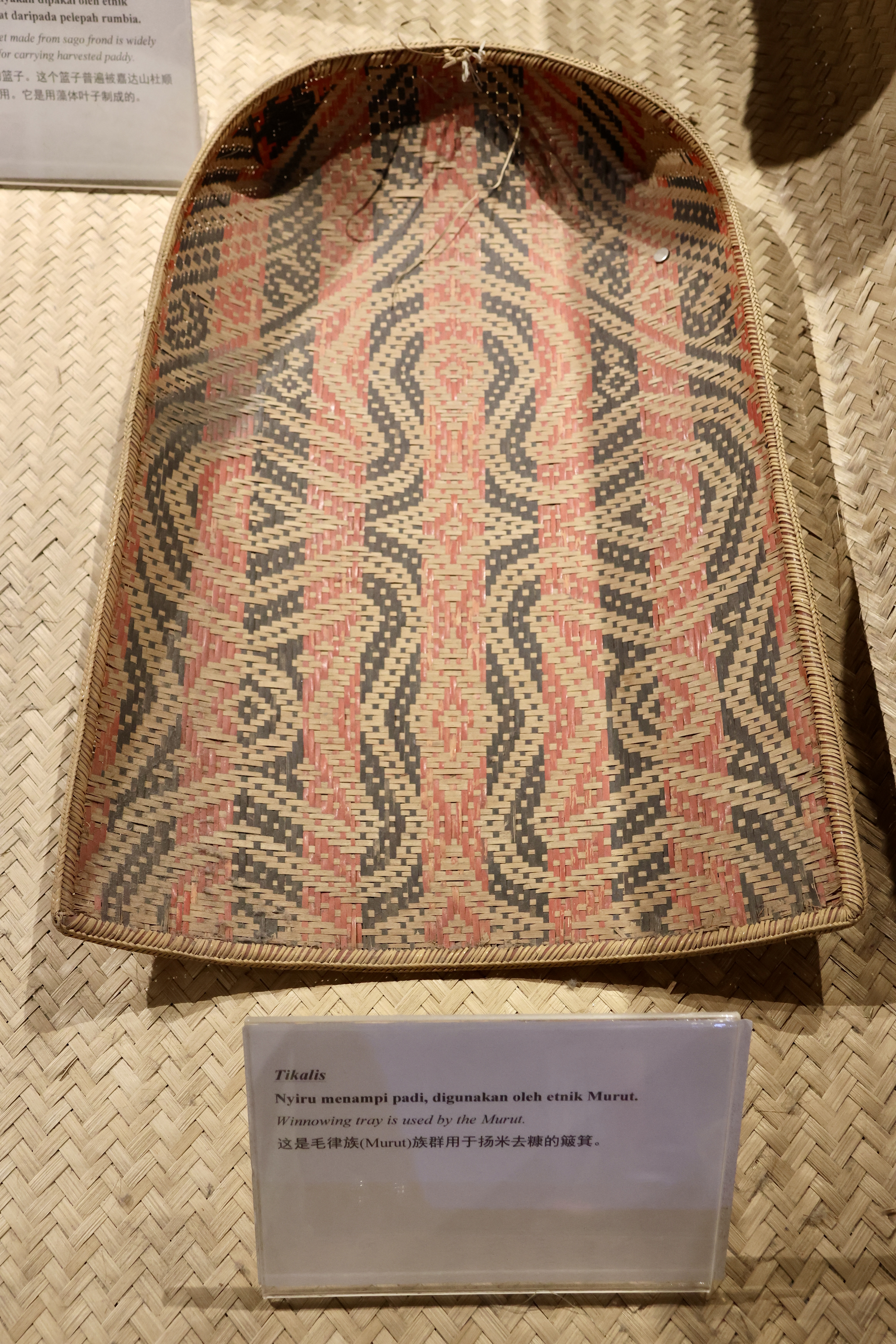
Murut tikalis (also known as tampi or tapan) exhibited at the Sabah Museum

The Murut traditional handicrafts of kelarai are most notable among those in Keningau and Tenom, where the designs have distinctive white and black floral and geometric patterns and are made from salingkawang (wild creeper of the Lygodium family), as well as bamboo and rattan. The process of kelarai making needed precise calculations to produce the desired shape, the bamboo is painted with black smoke from kerosene lamps collected overnight before being mixed with water obtained from the bark, or in the local language known as the uvul tree. The black colour would be the pattern on every handicraft produced and had its own meaning related to the stories of the Murut tribe, as well as a connection with nature. British North Borneo government officer George Cathcart Woolley once made documentation on the variety of Murut basketwork, including the use of motifs and symbolic themes gathered through interviews with the Murut community. Apin and lantungan refer to the Murut term for woven mat, especially among Tahol Muruts, with three different types of apin lantungan, lantungan ulia, and lantungan puaran.

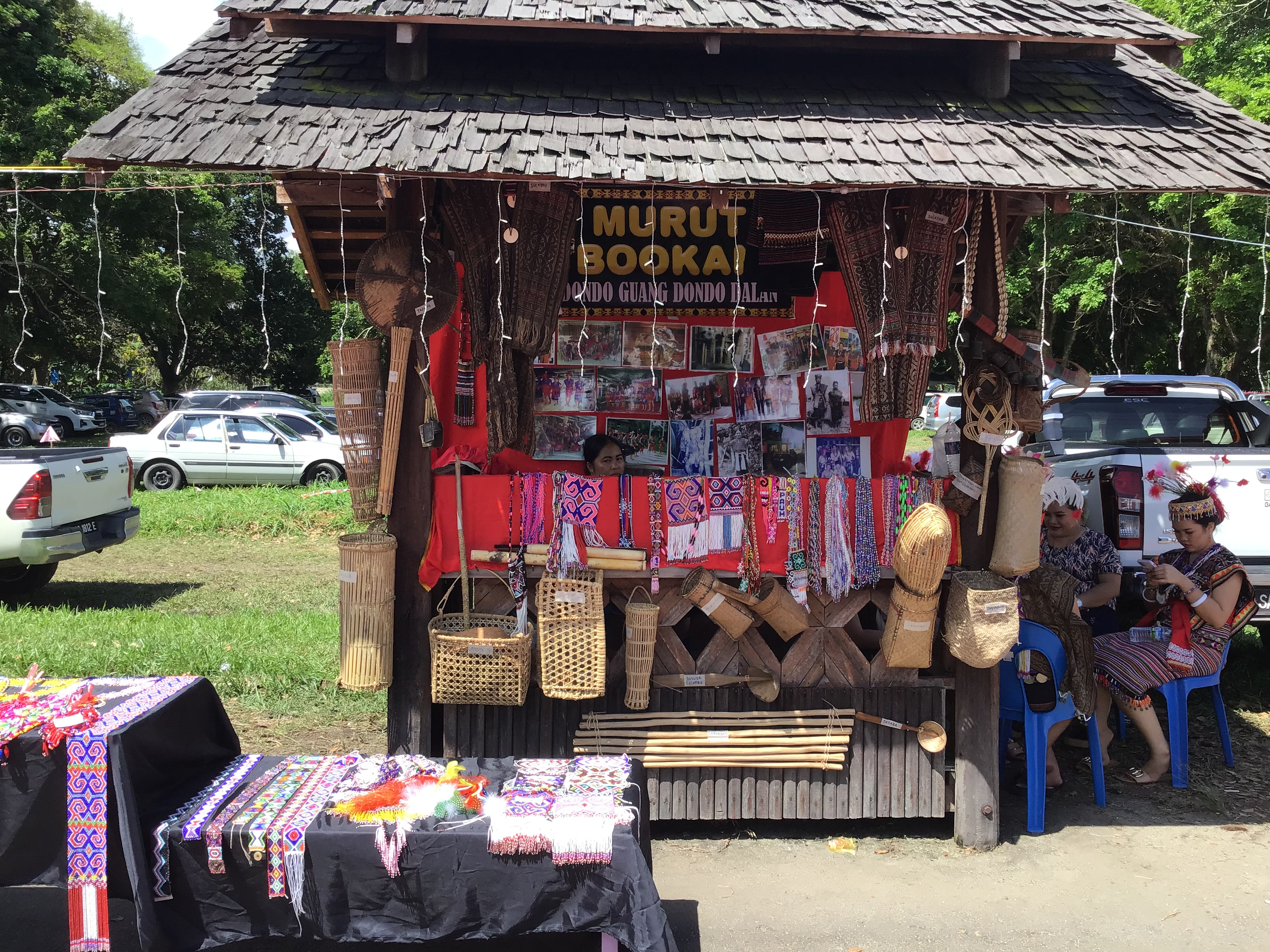
Bookan Murut handicrafts booth during the Kalimaran festival

The Murut traditional basket, the buyong, was widely used in the past to gather forest produce. By different names and sizes, such as the barait (among Muruts of Keningau), the sasaging and takiding (among Muruts of the Padas River), and the balait (Muruts of Tenom). Throughout the headhunting period, traditional baskets were also used in the past by Murut warriors to carry human heads of slain enemies. Several other Murut baskets, mostly small in size, including the banso, bundasan, kalong, kapa, kapon, sasar, tapan, takinan, and tinkapan. The tikalis were used to winnow rice and as a tray during wedding ceremonies in the past, whereas now they are being used more as souvenirs and home decorations as well as props in dance performances. Various initiatives are being carried out to preserve Murut handicraft culture, such as teaching younger generations the handicraft and embroidery-making skills to ensure a continuous legacy.

=== Marriage ===
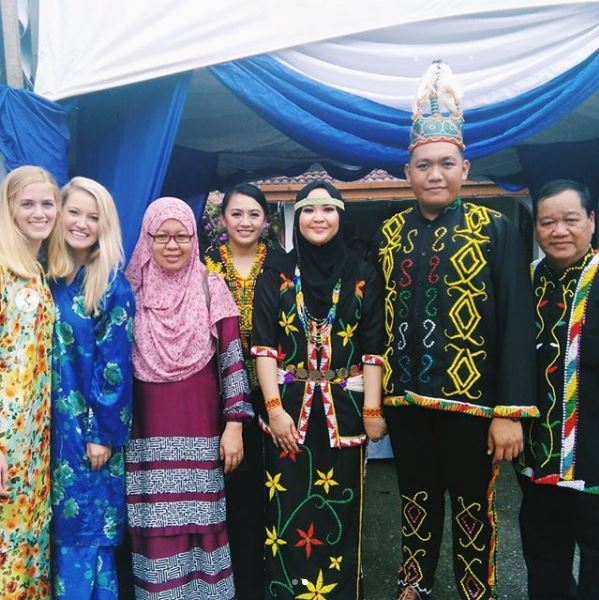
Traditional Murut wedding attended by both Muslims and non-Muslims Murut family members along with US officials from the Fulbright English Teaching Assistant (ETA) program in Keningau District of Sabah

Traditional Murut weddings in Sabah are known for their unique, lively, and long customs, often involving the entire related family community. They are characterised by elaborate dowry (barian) customs, day-long ceremonies, and beaded traditional clothing, which include special ceremonies such as tina'uh, bului, or limpoho. Although modernity has made ceremonies like tina'uh increasingly rare, important elements such as beaded beads and tajau (pottery) as dowry items are still maintained to symbolise the unification of the marriage bond. The use of tajau in Murut marriage customs is inseparable since most Murut believe the spirits in the tajau will determine the longevity of every Murut couple's relationship, where its usage started from the beginning of the marriage proposal along with other items such as beads and cooking pans. Further other items include the gong, which is believed to strengthen the marriage bond; the special parang berambut (similar to the Iban parang ilang), which is, however, owned by only certain individuals, especially Murut warriors, and has been passed down through generations since the spirit within it can cause someone to fall sick (caused by sangor from the item spirit); the bului (Murut blowpipe), which can protect the family couple; as well as the bungkas (female accessories), which can bring happiness to the recently married couple.

After successfully completing the marriage procession, the village head will usually give wishes to both the bride and groom, such as:

Murut

Rino akau nahanduk noyo,
montol ka aya am amanon huangon bal kayahan.

Translation:
English

Now both of you have officially become husband and wife,
live peacefully together and preserve the customs.

The Muruts, especially among the Tahol Murut (Tagal) sub-ethnic of inner Sapulut, Nabawan District (formerly Pensiangan District), and Tenom District, are famously known for their "barian sampai mati" (dowry until the end of lifetime), where the male side will continuously give dowry to the female side even until he becomes old and already has grandchildren. During the marriage, the female side will spend all their money on food to be given to the male side, while the male side brings tajau, beads and various other dowry items, and if the male is unable to finish all the food given by the female, both are required to bring the remaining. Several stages are involved during the procession which need to be followed by the male, including the subak omom, subak inasi, subak alabak, and inasi. The Tahol Murut also have their own sogit rules, which are recognised by the Native Court of Sabah, for various offences related to married couples, such as incest, second marriage to a widow, abstinence period for widows and widowers (death of wife), lapau (cheating), divorce, and ambangan (polygyny).

=== Cuisine ===
Since most of the Muruts are farmers who hunt, gather forest products and freshwater fishes, which are also influenced by the geographical conditions of their settlement in the interior of the country, which is mountainous, forested and riverine. The terrain provides many sources of food, with Murut cuisine based on forest and river produce as well as plants and hunting found in the forest, similar to their other related indigenous ethnic group, the Dusunic groups. In Murut traditional cuisine, cassava and tapioca are important crops, providing the main ingredients in a number of the ethnic variations of foods. Various types of cassava dishes, either cassava shoots, boiled or fried, including ferns, tarap (Artocarpus odoratissimus) fruit, pickled fish, and meat, as well as sago made from cassava, have become part of Murut staples. Being far from the sea area, the Murut diet primarily consists of freshwater fish.

Among the common staples for the Muruts in Sabah are hill rice of linopot (also part of the symbolic dish for Kadazan, Dusun, and Rungus people, although the Murut versions are slightly different), inau (tapioca starch mixture which is closed in appearance to the ambuyat but different in ingredients), umbus soup (cassava shoots soup), polor soup (bangkala or Arenga undulatifolia), papait sinamsam (boiled fish), tamba (preserved fish in salt and rice), tamba nu tambang (dried Sambar deer meat, also commonly known as payau meat among the Kadazan, Dusun, and Rungus), papait tinunuan (baked or roasted fish or meat), umbus tumis (boiled cassava leaves), kuraw tumis (boiled fern leaves), soko or rebung (bamboo shoots usually paired with smoked meats), ului kuih (fried or steamed cassava snack), and pulut kuih (glutinous rice like wajik, wrapped with banana leaves or irik (Phacelophrynium maximum leaves).

The Muruts of Sabah are known also for their raw wild boar fermented in bamboo tubes called jaruk, and tuhau pickle, which is made from wild ginger (Etlingera coccinea) mixed with vinegar, chillies, and lime, as a staple among the Murut and Kadazan-Dusun communities. Within Brunei, the Muruts are known for their baku tubu umbut tuhau (heart of palm with wild ginger of tuhau, a sort of pickled traditional food), biter kicep bubur cendawan kodop (Schizophyllum commune mushroom porridge), nuba tenga (traditional fragrant rice which is also the symbolic dish of Southern Muruts), kelupis baung, sup terong asam ikan luang (eggplant sour soup with Rasbora family fish), tutung suman (cassava kuih), libit leaves, tenum puluh suman rebung (bamboo shoots), tenum pais lauk (freshwater fishes wrapped in leaves and cooked on live coals, which subsequently gives a distinctive smoky aroma), and many others.

=== Religion ===
Religions of Muruts (Malaysians only)
Religion	Percent
Christianity	80.19%
Islam	18.04%
Folk religion / Other religions	0.21%
No religion / Unknown	1.56%

The majority of the Murut are Christians of Protestant adherents, with some Catholic and minority Islam. Prior to their conversion to Abrahamic religions, the dominant religion among the Muruts was Momolianism (Traditional North Bornean religion), which became the origin of the indigenous laws which are recognised and preserved by the Native Court of Sabah. Their traditional beliefs were once an integral part of Murut traditional life, where various ceremonies were held periodically, although communal ceremonies connected with warfare and headhunting have largely disappeared, while household rites are still being kept as part of the tradition. The arrival of Christianity to the Murut traced its history back to 1896 when Rev. Fred Perry of the Society for the Propagation of the Gospel (SPG), as part of the Anglican mission, trekked across the Crocker Mountains to Keningau District, preaching to the Murut villages and establishing a boarding school. Further missions by the Borneo Evangelical Mission (BEM) to reach the interior Tahol Muruts in the 1930s faced challenges and limited initial success due to their strong Animist-Pagan beliefs, leading to a shift in focus toward other indigenous groups of their closely related tribe, the Lundayeh.

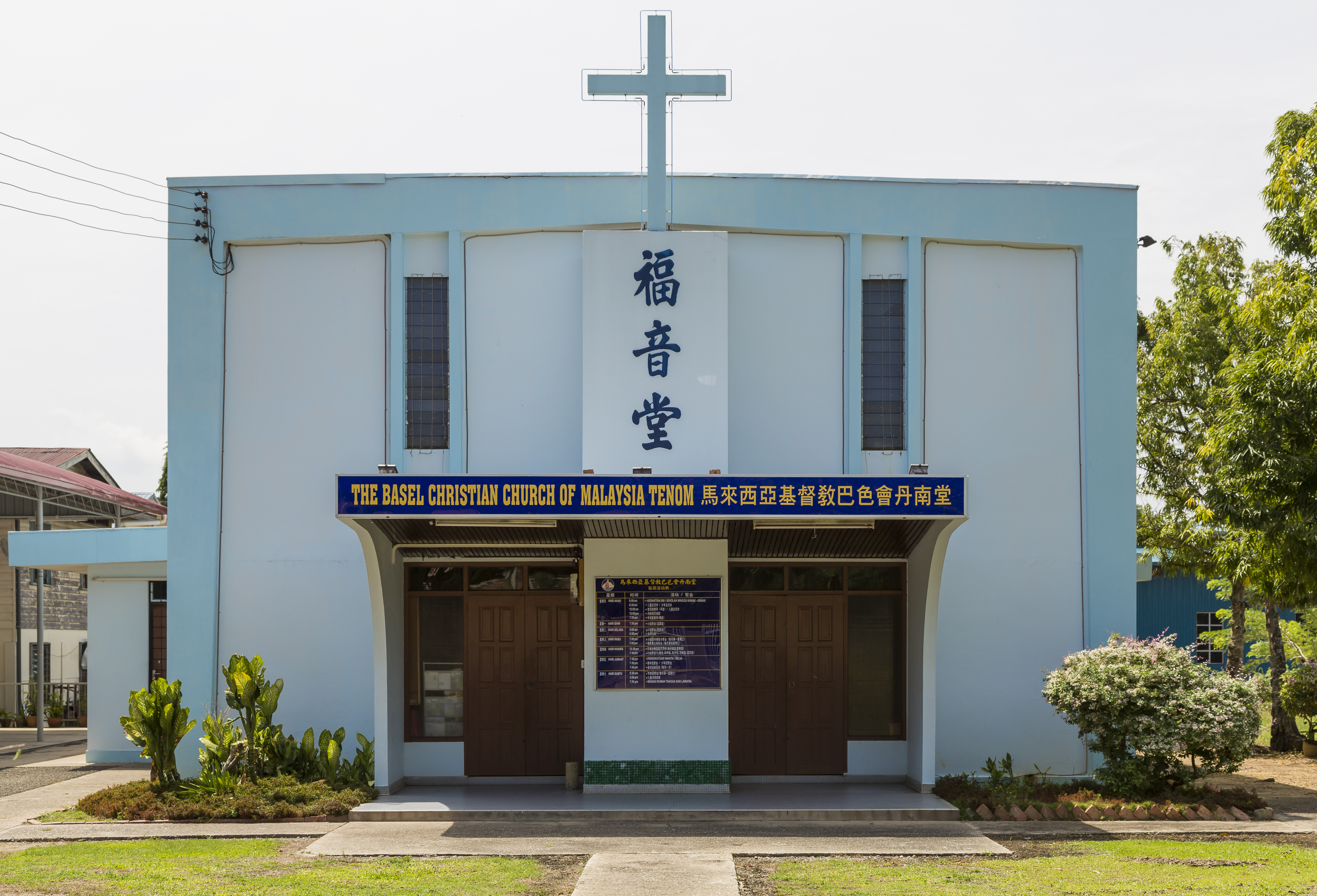
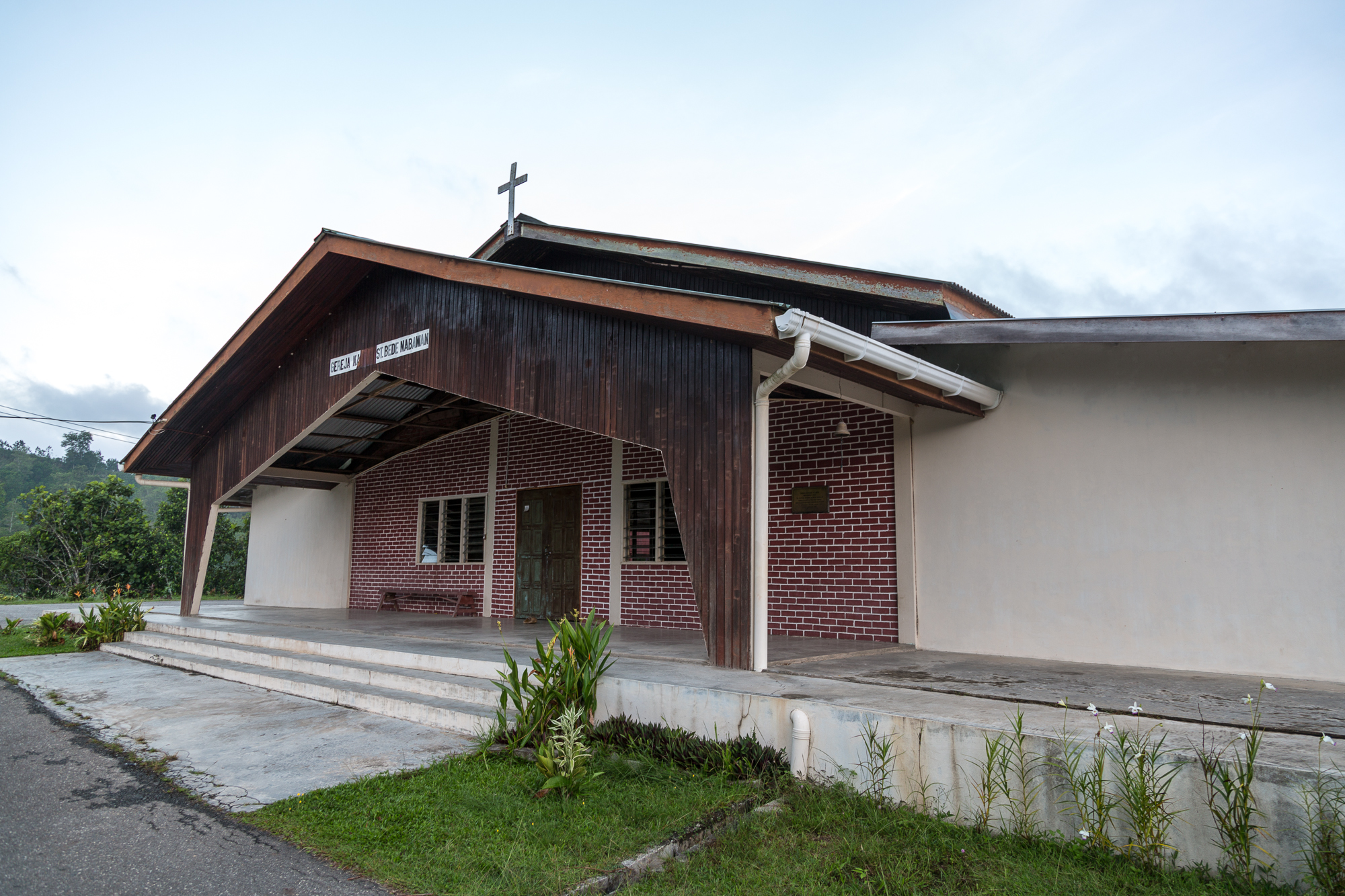
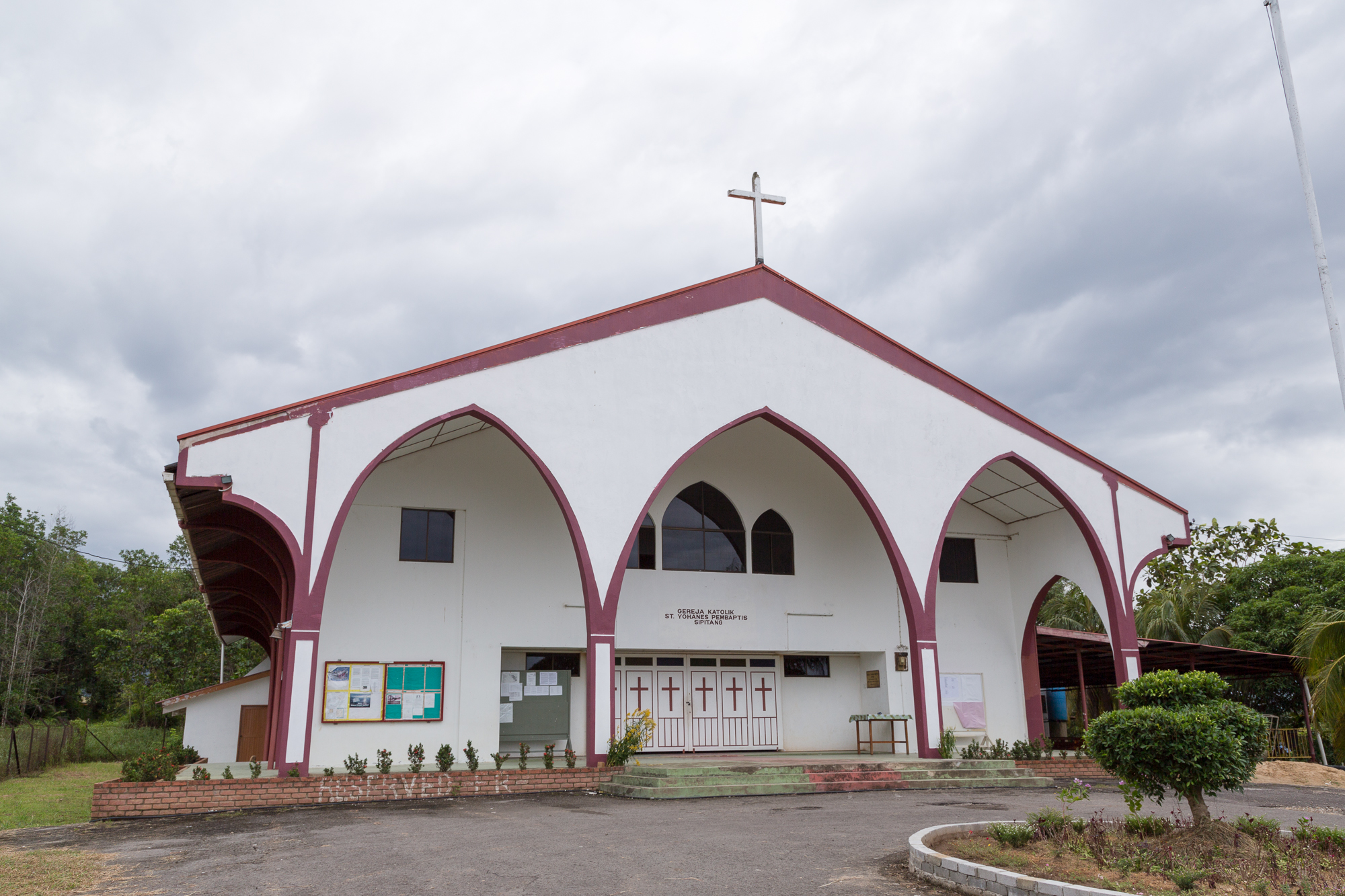
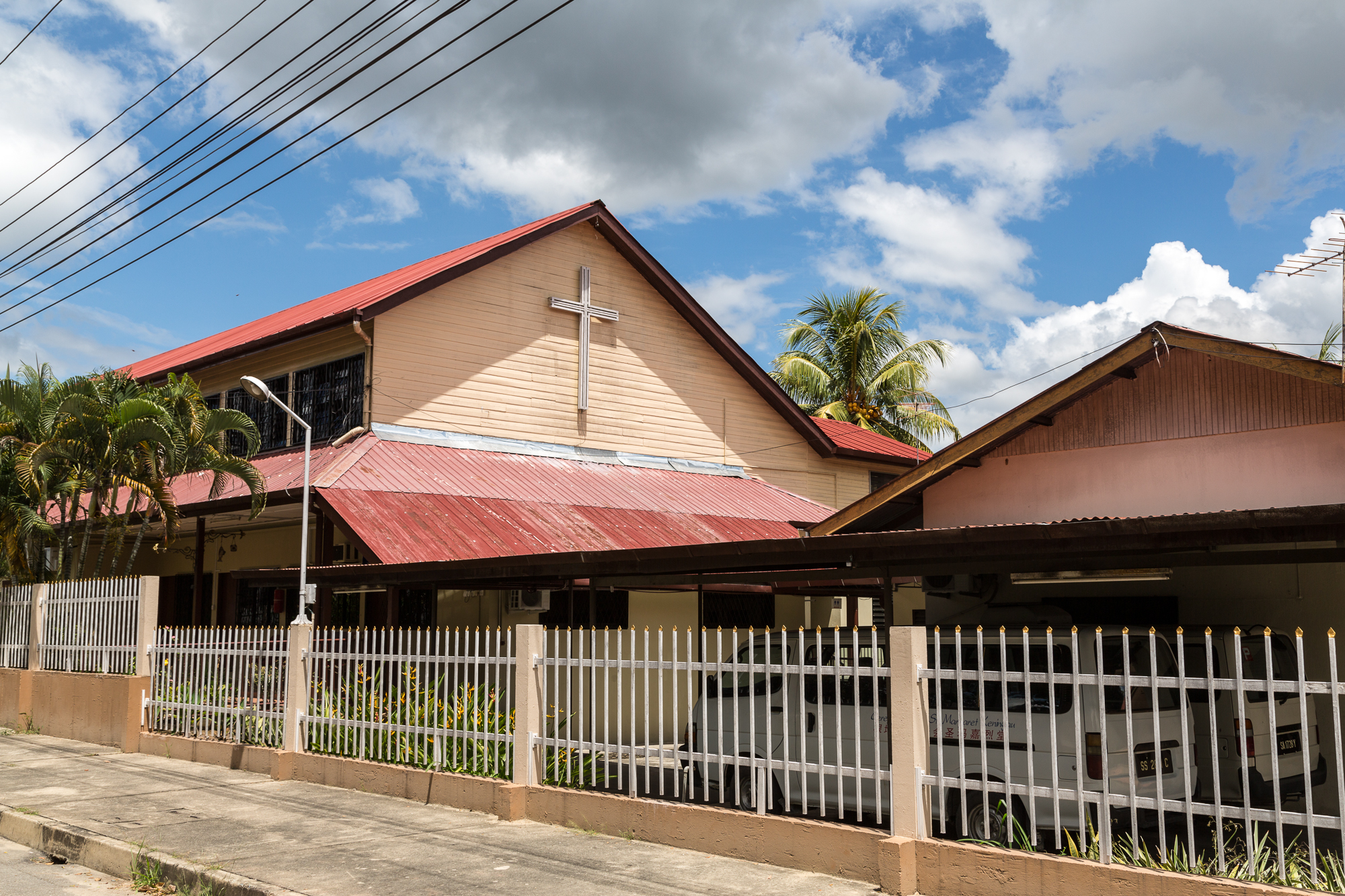
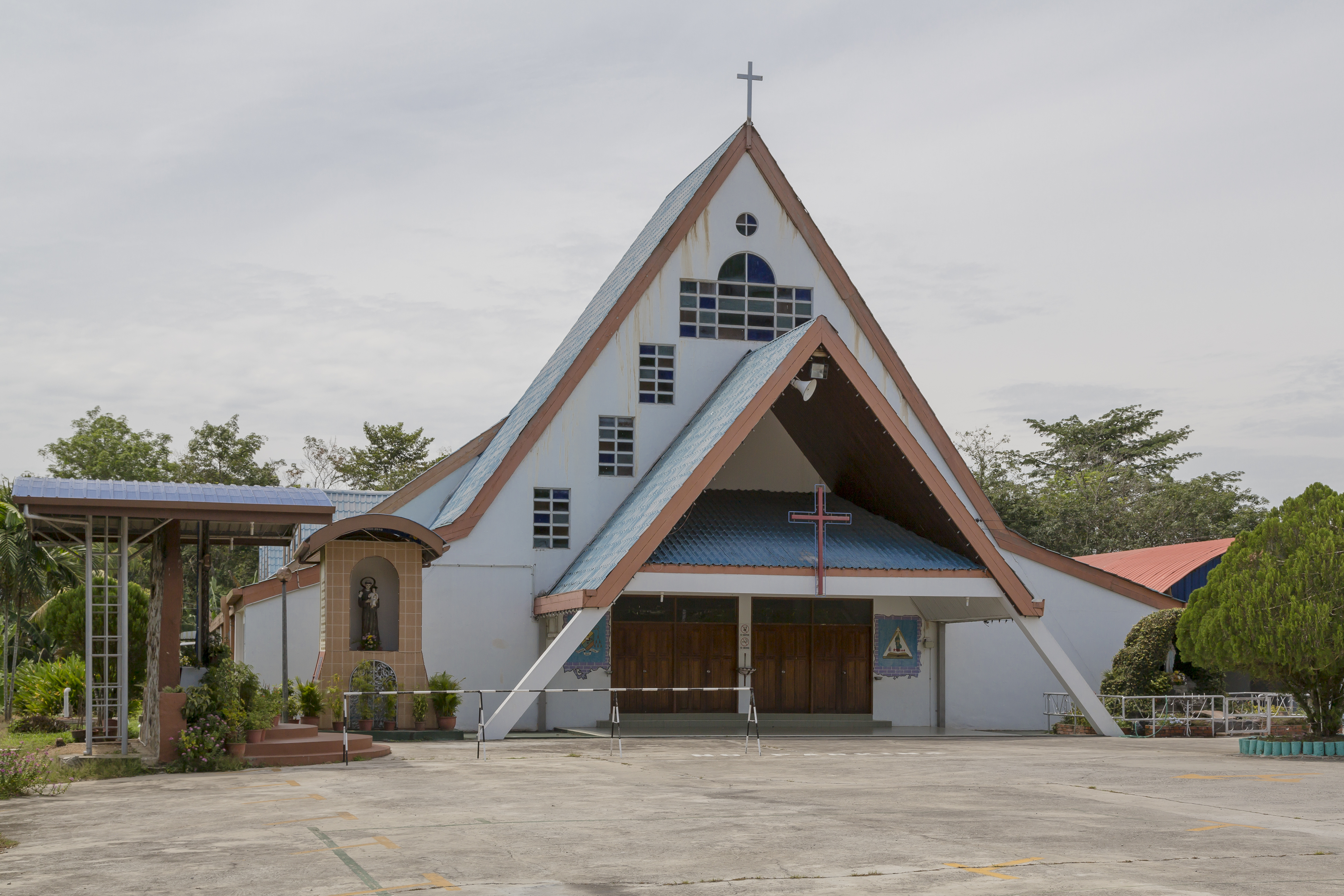
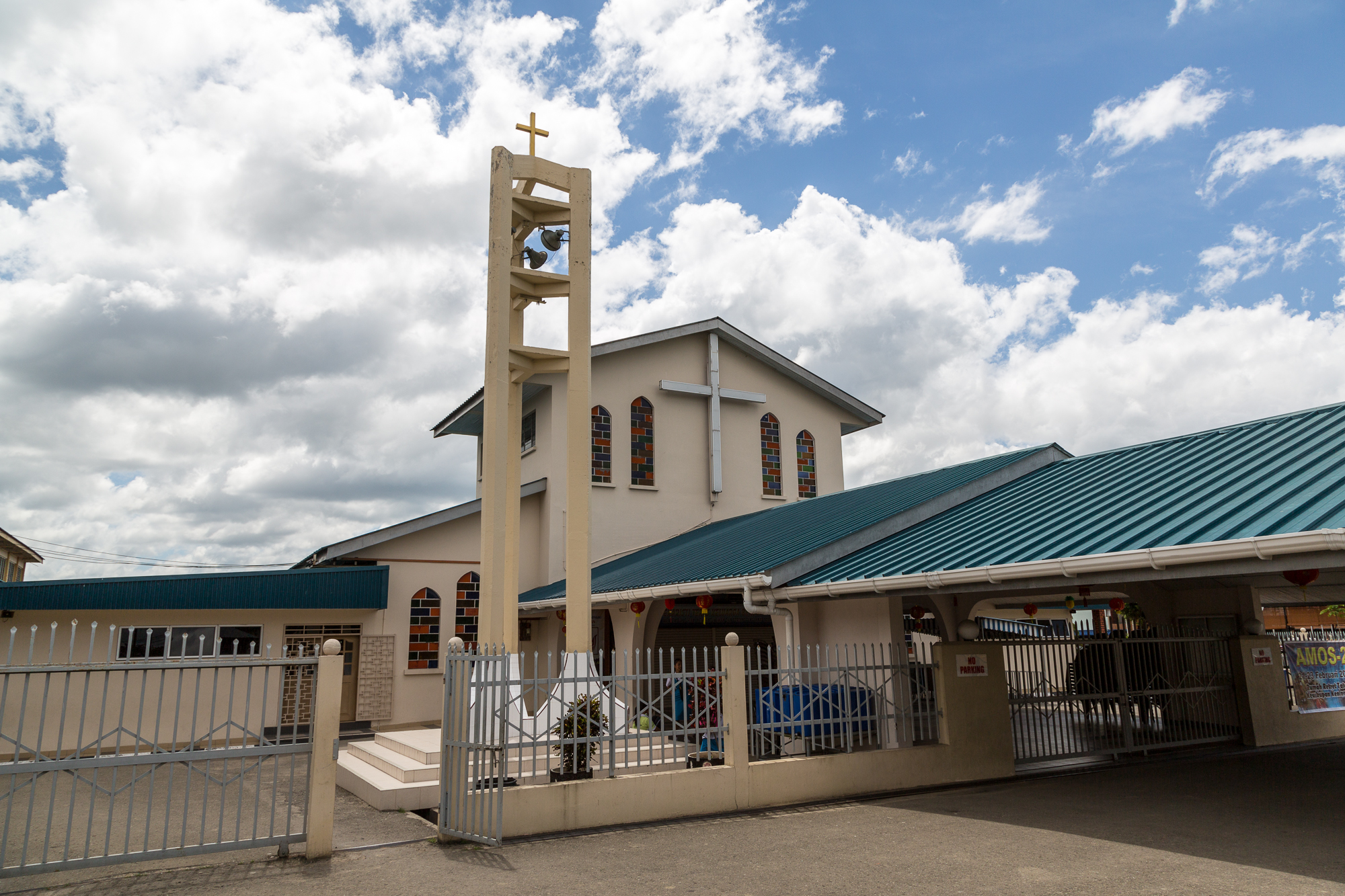
From clockwise: St Bede's Catholic Church in Nabawan District, St Margaret's Anglican Church as well as St Francis Xavier's Catholic Cathedral of Keningau District, St Anthony of Padua's Catholic Church of Tenom District, St John the Baptist's Catholic Church of Sipitang District, and Basel Lutheran Protestant Church in Tenom District. Various denominations of different branches within the Murut community's major religion of Christianity.

The arrival of British missionaries in the 1880s to North Borneo, particularly the Catholic Mill Hill Missionaries (MHM), led to further significant social change among the Muruts, with the efforts resulting in other Murut sub-ethnic embracing Roman Catholicism. The Timugon Muruts, warmly received the Roman Catholic mission, and by the 1960s, almost every one of them had converted to the religion. The MHM played a significant role in the socio-economic development and welfare of indigenous communities in North Borneo, beginning in the late 19th century and intensifying in the 1950s and 1960s where they were crucial sponsors and initiators of resettlement, education, and agricultural development in remote areas, with the transition of indigenous groups into settled agriculturalists. The vast majority of Muruts in Keningau, Tenom, and Nabawan (formerly Pensiangan) adhered to Protestant Christianity based on the Lutheran section mission brought by the Basel Mission, which is now the Basel Christian Church of Malaysia (BCCM), formerly known as the Borneo-Basel Self-Established Church, together with the mission from the BEM, or Borneo Evangelical Church (BEC), of Evangelicalism and Charismatic.

With positive changes being observed by their fellow Muruts towards the community, especially through improved literacy through religious education which contributed to community development, a group of Tahol Muruts travelled by themselves to the neighbouring district of Sipitang to meet missionary Alan Belcher, asking for the Bible to be taught to them. A significant minority of the Murut follow Islam, and despite a significant number of them adhering to major Abrahamic religions, the Adats still play a large part in the Murut culture. This group underwent a period of Islamisation throughout the administration of the United Sabah National Organisation (USNO) in the 1960s and especially after 1973, when Islam was controversially amended as an official state religion of Sabah, which subsequently eroded the original agreement written in the oath stone promised between the federal government of Malaysia and the indigenous interior Dusuns and Muruts of North Borneo that there shall be no official religion for the territory. (Note: The control of Sabah by indigenous parties was weakened since the 1980s due to internal divisions and the entrance of West Malaysia-based parties that began to damage the region's balanced social and religious demographics. Further, millions of Muslim immigrants, mainly from the neighbouring Indonesia or the Philippines, were brought into Sabah, which further shifted political power away from indigenous peoples, which disregards what had been promised earlier through the 20-point agreement of the Malaysia Agreement, especially in the context of religious freedom when Islam was controversially turned into Sabah's official religion through the attempts of the third Chief Minister of Sabah, Mustapha Harun, in 1973.) Among the Muslim Muruts, such as the Tahol Muruts of Nabawan, where local Adats are strongly preserved and practised widely, there has also been contradiction between the local ethnic laws and Islamic law since any law related to the Muslims of the country falls under Malaysia's state Islamic jurisprudence of Sharia rules.

=== Language ===
The Murutic languages are composed of various Murut sub-ethnic languages spoken over the southwestern portion of the state of Sabah, neighbouring Sarawak and Indonesian Borneo. The Murut languages within Sabah are referred to as "Northern Murut languages", while those in Brunei, Sarawak, and North Kalimantan of Indonesia are "Southern Murut languages". In Sarawak, the Murut language term refers closely to the ethnic Kelabit people as well as those in Brunei, North Kalimantan and the upper Padas River of Sabah, the Lundayeh ethnic, while in Sabah the language refers to the ethnic inhabiting the southwest portion and parts of North Kalimantan, with great similarities to the languages of the Philippines of Tagalog, similar to the Kadazan, Dusun, and the Rungus.

The use of the language has been declining due to the use of Malay by the Malaysian federal government and the use of English by missionaries, which was done through the method of language shift enforced by the work of both the colonial and federal governments. Several language preservation policies have been initiated by the government of Sabah to prevent the continuous decline, which is also happening to other groups of indigenous languages of Sabah. In 2024, around ten primary schools in the Tenom District become the pilot projects for teaching the Timugon Murut language. This was followed with the introduction of Timugon Murut online dictionary in early 2026. Kemabong Assemblyman Rubin Balang, being a Murut native speaker himself, also emphasised the need for the language to be elevated as a marker of identity.

== Indigenous status ==
Being indigenous to Sabah and within the federation of Malaysia, the Murut are conferred the same political, educational and economic rights as the predominant Malay population of Malaysia. The term ascribed to this is "Bumiputera" (from Sanskrit "bhumiputra"), a Malay word which translates to "sons of the land".

== Notable figures ==
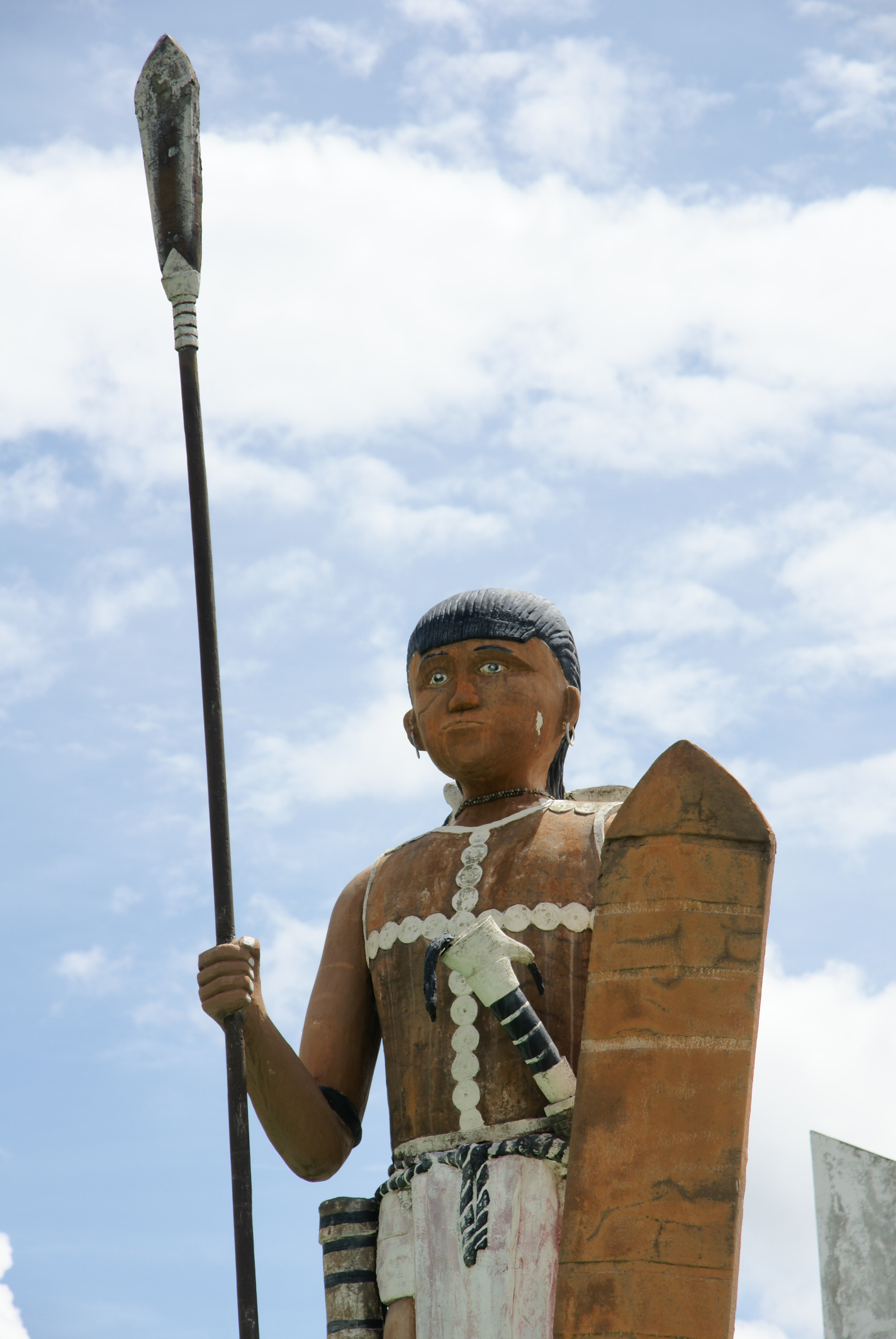
Statue of Ontoros Antanom (Antanum) standing high in Tenom District of Sabah, a Murut leader highly revered by the community, pictured in 2011

- Antanum (alternatively spelled as Antanom) (1885–1915) – Murut warrior who fought against the British North Borneo Chartered Company (NBCC) but was killed while fighting against the company forces in Selangit River near Pensiangan.
- Gounon Lulus (alternatively spelled as Gaunon Lulus) – Murut man who built a railroad from Tanjung Aru, Jesselton District to Melalap, Tenom District of British North Borneo with British civil engineer Arthur Joseph West.
- Andre Anura – Sabah and Malaysian athlete from Tenom District.
- Lucas Umbul – former senator of Malaysian Senate and Parliament member.
- Ellron Alfred Angin – former state assemblyman for Sook from 2008 to 2025 and former Sabah State minister.
- Rubin Balang – Sabah State Minister for Rural Development.
- Riduan Rubin – Tenom MP and son of Rubin Balang.
- Noorita Sual – Senator of Malaysian Senate and Parliament member.
- Raime Unggi – former member of the Malaysian Parliament.
- Tracie Sinidol – Malaysian actress and model, also of partial Dusun ancestry.
- The late Tun Ahmad Koroh (né Thomas Koroh) (1925–1978) – fifth head of state (TYT) of Sabah, also of partial Dusun ancestry.
- The late Tan Sri Suffian Koroh (1930–2018) – former Deputy Chief Minister of Sabah during the Sabah People's United Front (BERJAYA) era.
- The late John Daukom (1937–2010) – former Sabah athlete and Malaysian Olympic sprinter.
