= Sabah State Route SA2 =

Road in Malaysia

Sabah Route SA2
- Tambunan–Ranau Highway
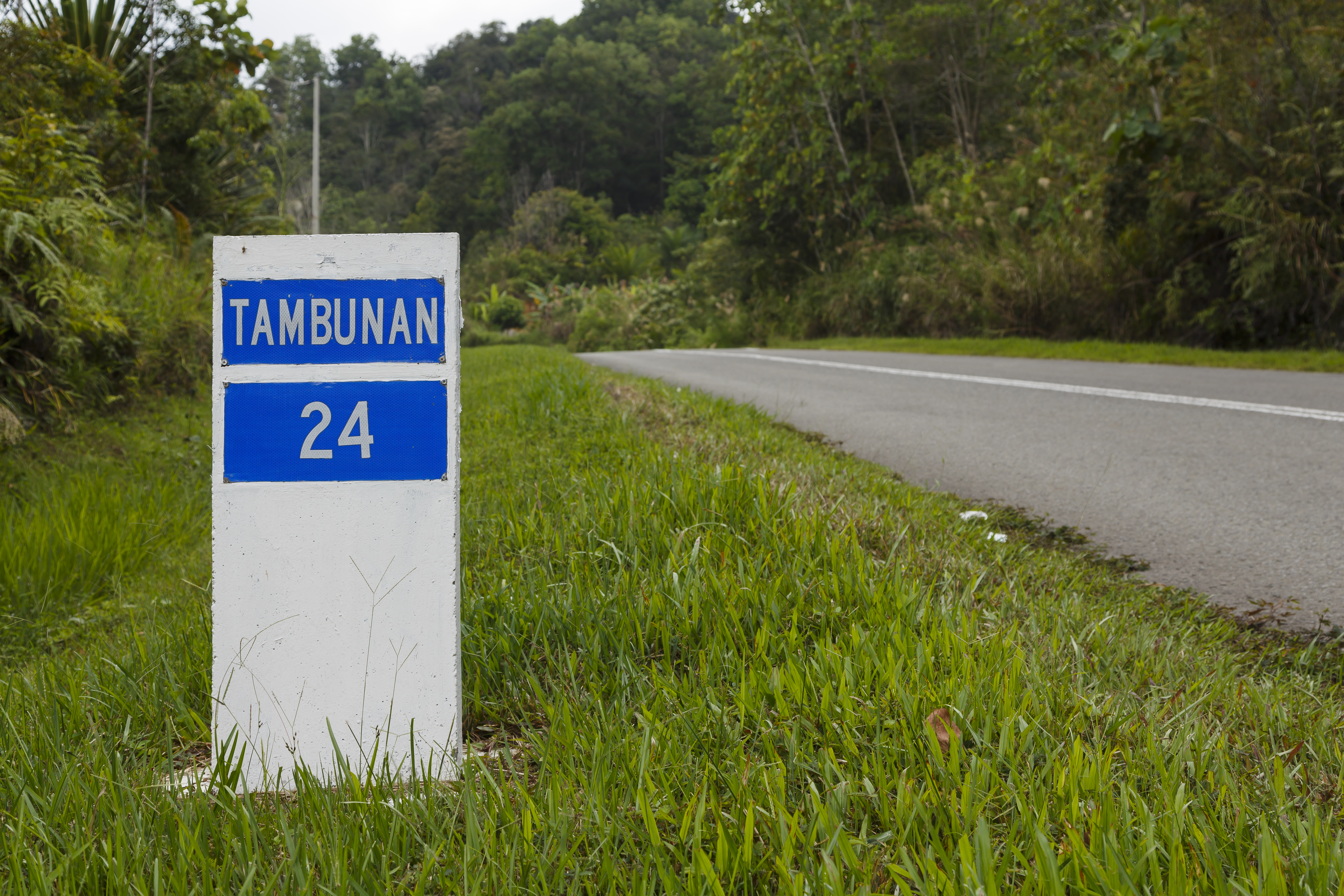
- A milestone along the Tambunan–Ranau Highway.

Route information
- Length: 55.2 km (34.3 mi)

Major junctions
- Southwest end: Tambunan
- FT 500 Federal Route 500/Interior North–South Highway; FT 22 Federal Route 22
- Northeast end: Ranau (continues as Pan-Borneo Highway)

Location
- Country: Malaysia
- Primary destinations: Keningau, Tambunan, Penampang, Ranau, Kundasang

Highway system
- Highways in Malaysia; Expressways; Federal; State

State Route SA2 is a 55.2 kilometres (34.3 mi) state highway in Sabah, Malaysia that connects the area of Tambunan alongside the Interior Division village to Ranau. It was start at the famous ginger roundabout then ends at a junction intersect with the Federal Route 22 near the town of Ranau. This state highway is recognized as the northern route continued after Federal Route 500.

The highway also serves as an alternative to the Federal Route 22 from Kota Kinabalu to Ranau. Despite being a longer route, it is less congested compared to both the Federal Route 1 into Tamparuli–Ranau Highway, which both routes are part of Pan Borneo Highway.

== Junction list ==
Legend:

- I/C - Interchange, I/S - Intersection, RSA - Rest and service area, OBR - Overhead bridge restaurant, R/R - Restaurant and rest plaza, L/B - Layby, V/P - Vista point, TN - tunnel, T/P - Toll plaza, BR - Bridge
- C - Cloverleaf, S - Stack, T-A - Trumpet-A, T-B - Trumpet-B, DT - Directional-T/Y, SDT - Semi-Directional-T/Y, P-Y - Partial-Y, D - Diamond, P-C - Partial cloverleaf, D-D - Diverging diamond, D-R - Direct ramp

Division	District	Location	km	mi	Name	Destinations	Notes
Interior	Tambunan	Tambunan	0.0	0.0	Tambunan; Ginger Roundabout	FT 500 Federal Route 500 – Penampang, Kota Kinabalu, Tambunan, Keningau, Tenom	Roundabout
Interior	Tambunan	Tambunan	7.6	4.7	Kg. Patau	Mahua Waterfall	Junction
Interior	Tambunan	Tambunan	8.7	5.4	-- m above sea level Tambunan bound, Engage lower gear		
Interior	Tambunan	Tambunan	20.2	12.6	Kg. Kirokot		
Interior	Tambunan	Tambunan	24.8	15.4	Kg. Pahu	Jalan Pahu Sintuong–Tuong – Kg. Tudan, Terolobou, Kiulu	Junction
Interior	Tambunan	Tambunan	29.3	18.2	Kg. Tontolob Liwan		
West Coast	Ranau	Ranau	30.0	18.6	-- m above sea level Ranau bound, Engage lower gear		
West Coast	Ranau	Ranau	38.3	23.8	Kg. Randagong	Kg. Terelobou, Kg. Karanaan, Kg. Himbaan, Bundu Tuhan, Kiulu	Junction
West Coast	Ranau	Ranau	45.2	28.1	Kg. Kinarasan		T-junction
West Coast	Ranau	Ranau	54.5	33.9	Jalan Masjid	Ranau	Roundabout
West Coast	Ranau	Ranau	55.2	34.3	Ranau	FT 22 Federal Route 22 – Ranau, Kundasang, Tamparuli, Kota Kinabalu, Telupid, Beluran, Sandakan, Lahad Datu, Tawau	Signalised T-junction
1.000 mi = 1.609 km; 1.000 km = 0.621 mi

== Route background ==
Tambunan–Ranau Highway is a rugged, mountainous two-lane roads in Sabah, Malaysia. It traverses across valley, between Crocker Range and Trusmadi Range. According to the Malaysian Public Works Department, most steep road gradient reached up to 10% as a moderately steep highways, and like other steep or hilly highways, a traditional climbing lane was provided. The road summit at 998 metres (3,274 ft), reaching nearly 1,000 m (3,300 ft) above sea level which makes it one of the highest roads in the Malaysian state of Sabah.

Although the two-lane road are mostly paved, some section are also riddled with potholes, sink holes and uneven road, even on a once good condition road segment, specifically on location 5°53'59.8"N 116°37'23.7"E.

The highway was built under the JKR R5 road standard with a 60km/h speed limit, but because certain road condition may vary, the speed limit dropped to 40 and 50km/h.

=== Junctions ===
Along the highway, it has multiple junction, including alternative roads which leads to a villages, and both Kiulu and Tamparuli to the north, which are part of Tuaran District.

At 7.6 km (4.7 mi) away from the Ginger roundabout leads to a road junction, act as a gateway to the Mahua Waterfall, a waterfall within the Crocker Range National Park.

== Part of routes ==
=== Interior North–South Highway ===
While the highways remain as a state highway, it was part of the Interior North–South Highway which was a federal highway runs from Ranau down to Kemabong. Alongside the Federal Route 500 (which runs from Tambunan all the way to Tenom), State Route SA3 (Between Ulu Paal and Tenom) and State Route SA33 (until Kemabong only), are all intended to be part of this federal highway.

== Gallery ==
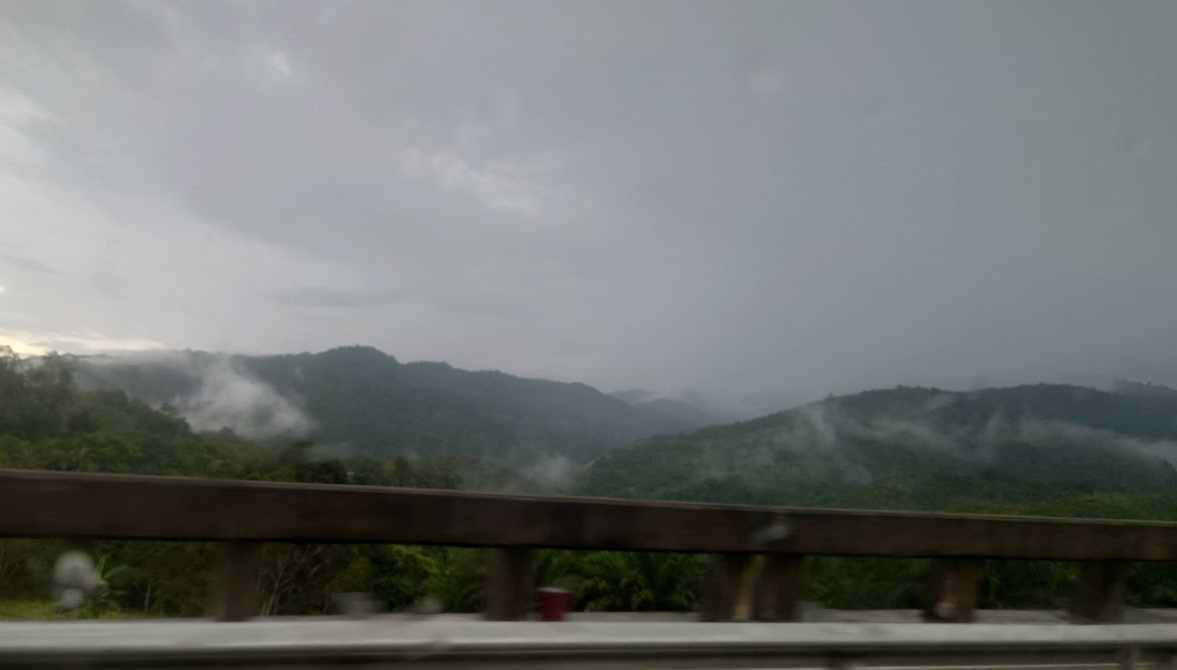
The Trusmadi Range view from the highway.

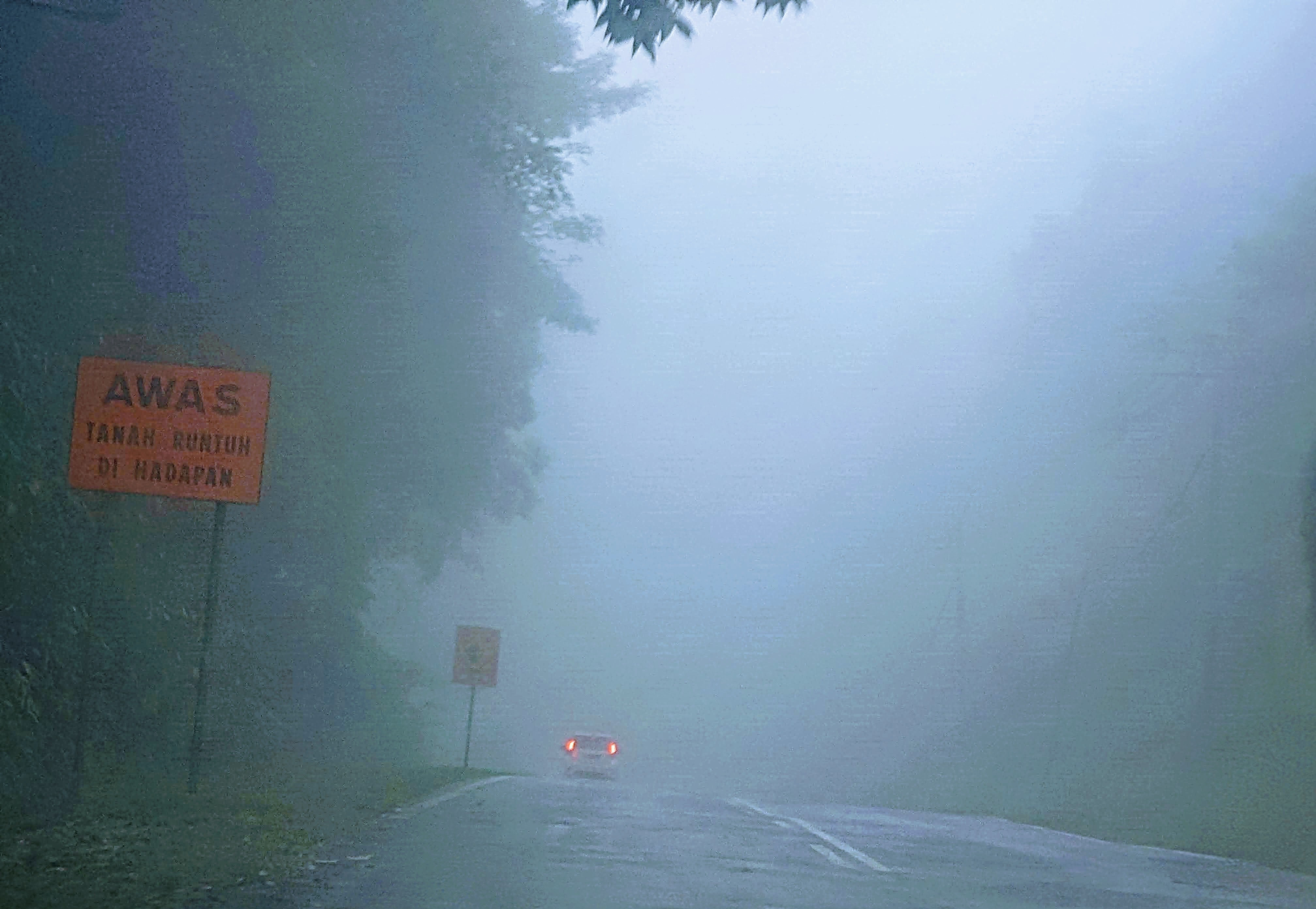
A foggy experience in the Tambunan–Ranau Highway.

== See also ==
- Federal Route 500
- Interior North–South Highway

== Certain incidents ==
- The highway was once cut off by a landslide in 8 January 2022, making the road impassable.
