= Sabah State Route SA3 =

Road in Malaysia

Sabah Route SA3
- Tenom–Sipitang Highway
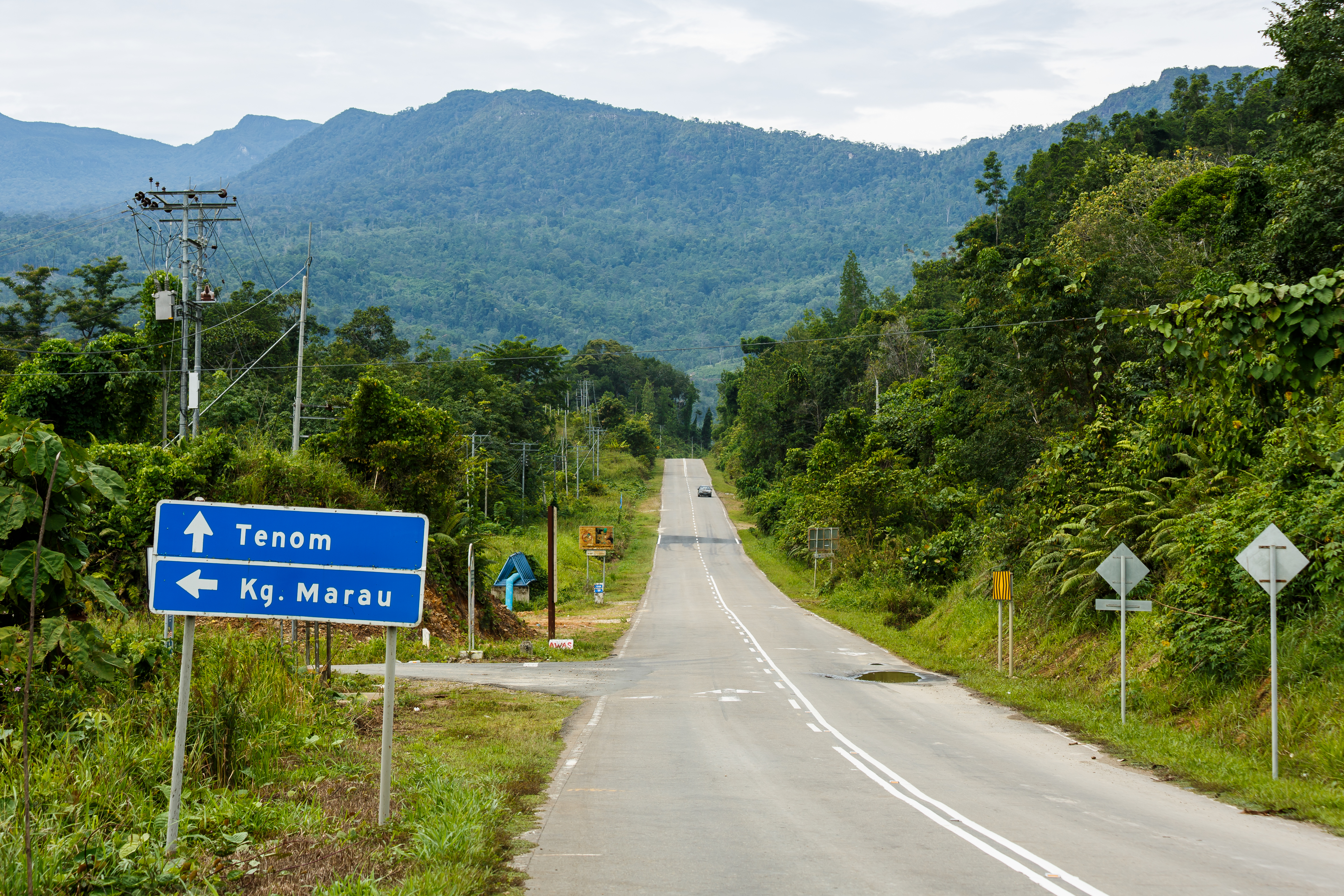
- Junction to Kg. Marau, in Sipitang, Sabah.

Route information
- Length: 71 km (44 mi)

Major junctions
- East end: Tenom
- FT 500 Federal Route 500; FT 22 (Interior North–South Highway) / FT 500 / FT 501; SA33 Jalan Paal–Kuala Tomani; FT 1 Federal Route 1
- West end: Sipitang (continues as Pan Borneo Highway)

Location
- Country: Malaysia
- Primary destinations: Tenom; Keningau (continues as Keningau–Tambunan Highway); Sipitang; Beaufort; Lawas (continues as Federal Route 1 (Sarawak))

Highway system
- Highways in Malaysia; Expressways; Federal; State

State Route SA3 (known as Route A3) was a 71 kilometres (44 mi) state highway in Sabah, Malaysia that connects the Tenom area to the Sipitang area. It serves as the main highway to connect most villages in the Interior Division of Sabah to Sipitang, as well as Sarawak. It also serves as a route continues after Federal Route 500.

It is one of the major remote and rugged highways in Sabah, Malaysia.

== Route background ==
The highway runs from Tenom to Paal was a 18 kilometres (11 mi) road, passing all estates road nearby plantation managed by SD Guthrie (formerly Sime Darby), similarly, Melalap–Tenom Road section from Federal Route 500. The highway ends at a roundabout where it meets the Paal–Kuala Tomani Highway, near the Paal villages. Then a 53 kilometres (33 mi) road which runs from east to west, traverses the Crocker Range, within the Mount Lumaku forest reserve, as well as two district, Tenom and Sipitang District, summit at 891 m (2,923 ft), known as the Tenom Hill Pass or Bukit Layang-Layang by most people in Tenom. It features steep gradient, ranging from 10% to 15%, with some section range only 12% to 14% being the steepest part, giving that punishing gradient that could slow down any vehicle. As a mountainous road, a traditional climbing road lane was provide for the ranging gradient though some was also staggered. Some segment in the Sipitang District also feature only rolling gradient (up to only 10%, moderately steep) after descending from the high Crocker Range area, as well as gravel, pothole and damaged roads around the forest and villages, including a slope repair. The highway ends at the Mengalong roundabout, continues as Federal Route 1 of Sabah, which eventually then continues ahead to Sarawak Federal Route 1.

Because of its high-altitude, sits around at 800 metres (2,600 ft), the road will experience fog/mist. Historically, the high-altitude section also features the yellow line road marking.

== Road origins ==
=== Original Sabah State Route SA3 ===
The State Route SA3 was once a much longer route in Sabah. A major portion of it is now designated as Federal Route 500, which runs from Kota Kinabalu to Tenom. Today, only the section between Paal and Tenom retains the state highway code. In addition, some section from Penampang to Tambunan, or Tenom to Keningau still uses the old code, provided by the signboard without the 'S' in it.

=== Tenom–Sipitang Highway ===
The Tenom–Sipitang Highway was once a rugged logging road, where driver from Tenom will uses the Kimanis–Keningau Highway to Sipitang which is only 183 kilometres (114 mi) long. After the highway was complete, the Tenom–Sipitang Highway was opened to traffic as well as commissioned as part of Sabah State Route SA3 in 2007, followed by the road from Paal to Kuala Tomani renumbered as Route SA33.

The highway was also considered as one of the highway in Sabah that was completed in the 2000s, alongside Kimanis–Keningau Highway (2006) and Kalabakan–Sapulut Highway (2008) which are all situated within the Interior Division.

== Junction lists ==
The entire route is located in Interior Division, Sabah.

Legend:

- I/C - Interchange, I/S - Intersection, RSA - Rest and service area, OBR - Overhead bridge restaurant, R/R - Restaurant and rest plaza, L/B - Layby, V/P - Vista point, TN - tunnel, T/P - Toll plaza, BR - Bridge
- C - Cloverleaf, S - Stack, T-A - Trumpet-A, T-B - Trumpet-B, DT - Directional-T/Y, SDT - Semi-Directional-T/Y, P-Y - Partial-Y, D - Diamond, P-C - Partial cloverleaf, D-D - Diverging diamond, D-R - Direct ramp

District	Location	km	mi	Name	Destinations	Notes
Tenom	Tenom			Tenom; Tenom town centre	FT 500 Federal Route 500/Interior North–South Highway – Melalap, Keningau, Tambunan, Kota Kinabalu, Ranau	Roundabout
Tenom	Tenom			Sungai Padas bridge		
Tenom	Tenom			Sapong		
Tenom	Tenom			Kg. Paal		
Tenom	Tenom			Ulu Paal	SA33 Jalan Paal–Kuala Tomani – Kemabong, Kuala Tomani	Roundabout
Tenom	Tenom			-- m above sea level Tenom bound, Engage lower gear		
Tenom	Tenom			Mount Lumaku Forest Reserve -- m above sea level		
Sipitang	Sindumin			-- m above sea level Sipitang bound, Engage lower gear		
Sipitang	Sindumin			Kg. Solob		
Sipitang	Sindumin			Short Tunnel I/S		
Sipitang	Sindumin			Kg. Muaya		
Sipitang	Sindumin			Long Pasia I/S	Jalan Pantai Meligan – Meligan, Long Mio, Long Pasia	Junctions
Sipitang	Sindumin			Melamam		Junctions
Sipitang	Sindumin			Kg. Lubang Buaya		
Sipitang	Sindumin			Mengalong	FT 1 Federal Route 1 – Kota Kinabalu, Beaufort, Sipitang, Sindumin, Lawas	T-junction
1.000 mi = 1.609 km; 1.000 km = 0.621 mi: Concurrency terminus

== Gallery ==
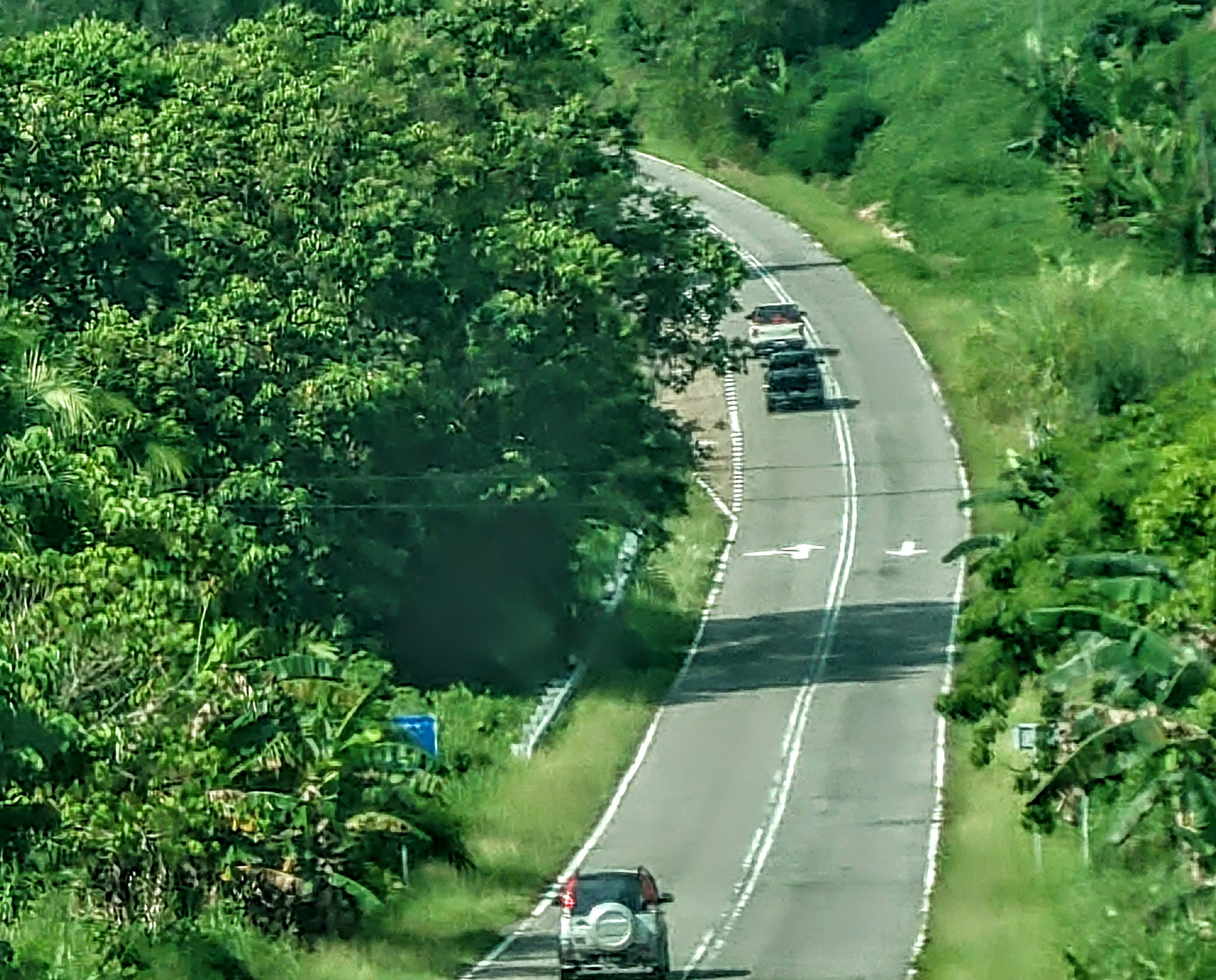
Parts of Sipitang–Tenom Highway, around the Sipitang District featuring rolling gradient, only up to 10%.

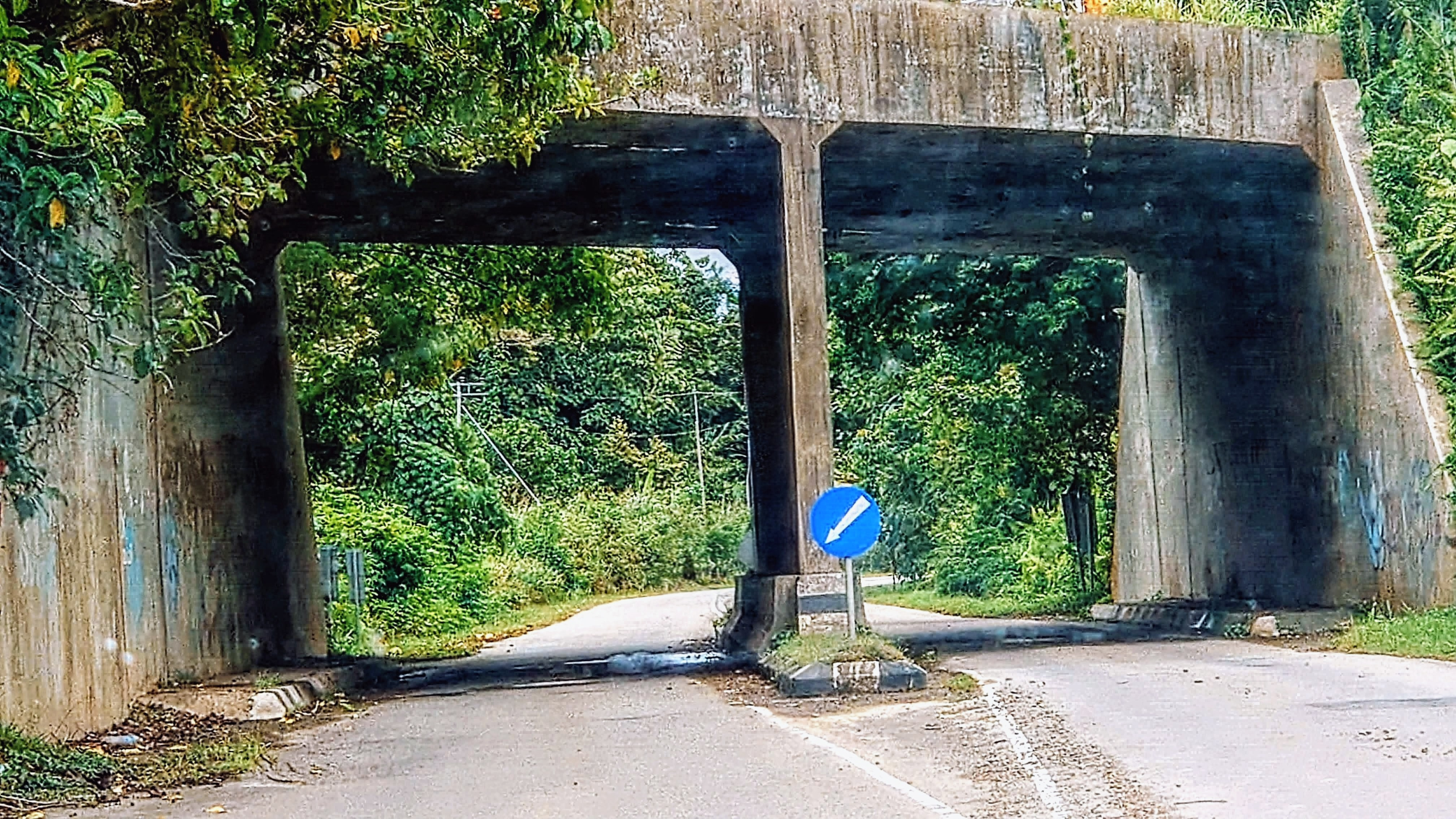
A short tunnel in the Tenom–Sipitang Highway.

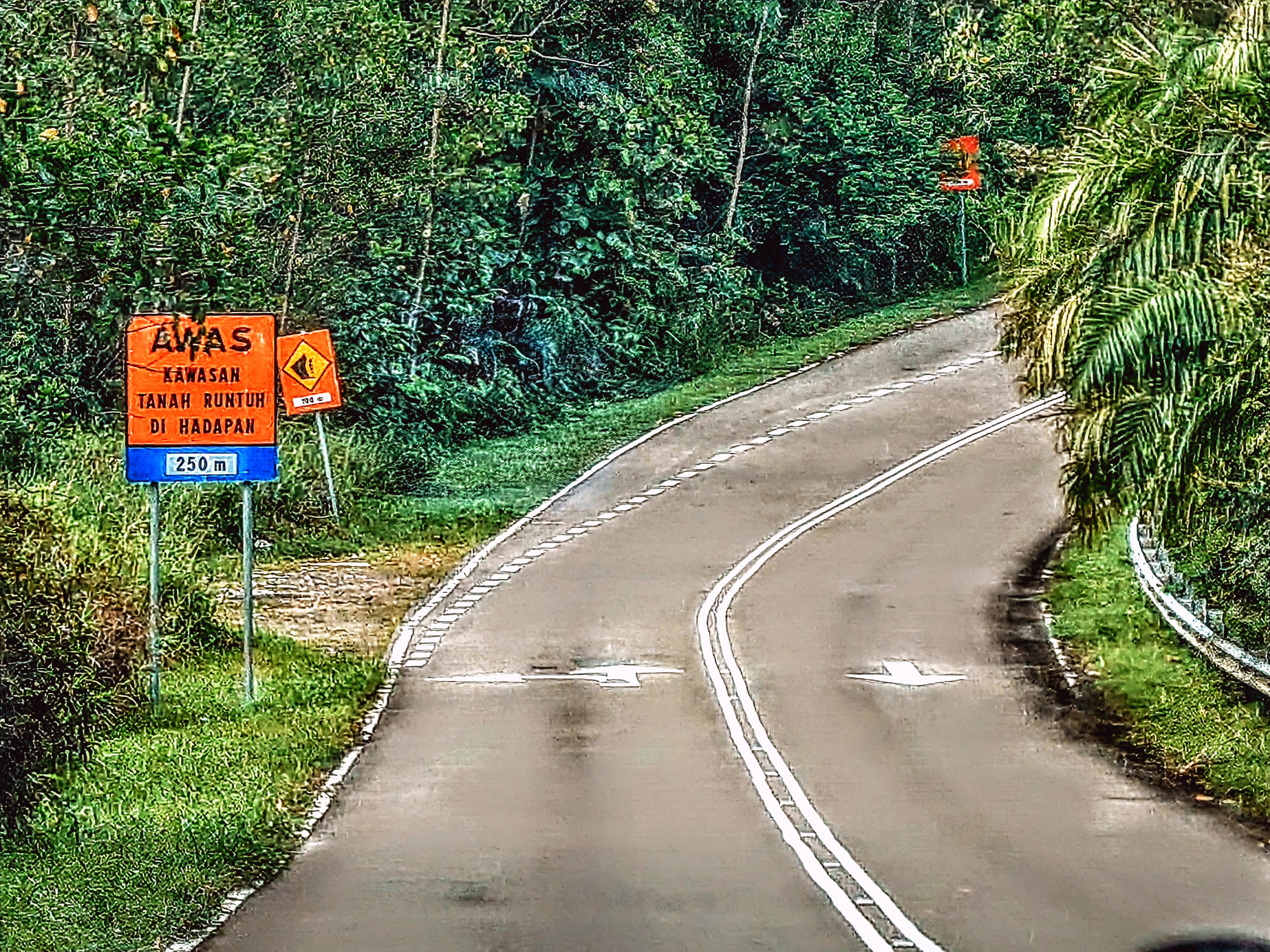
Sabah State Route SA3 as it cut through the Crocker Range. This section is mountainous, and most road gradient can hit from 10% to 15%, while some only range between 12% and 14% being the steepest part.

== See also ==
- State Route in Malaysia
- Federal Route 500

== Certain incidents ==
- A vehicle was once burned in the Tenom–Sipitang Highway though no injuries was reported.
