= Tawau–Keningau Highway =

Road in Malaysia

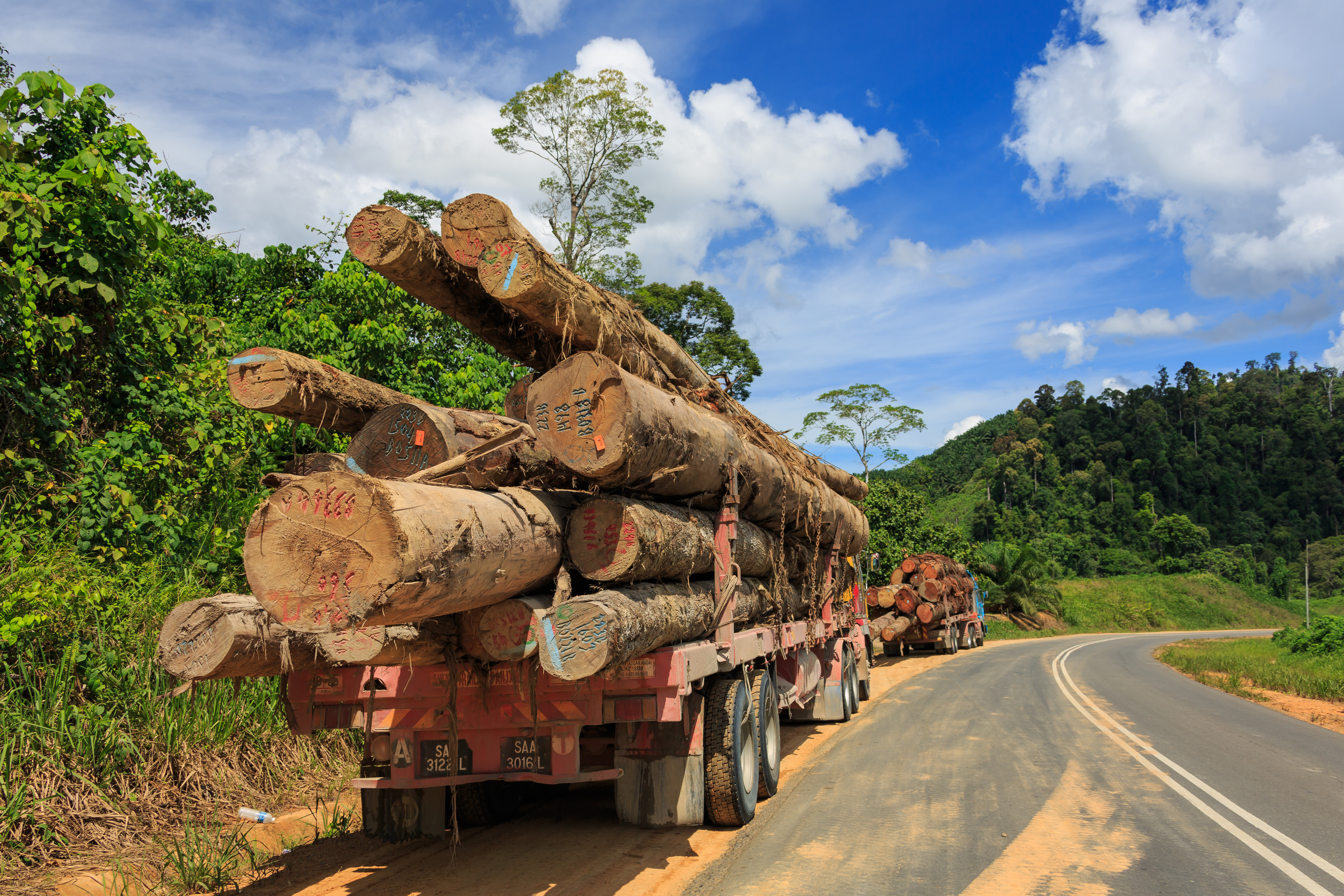
- Two logging trucks at the Kalabakan-Sapulut Road, taking heavy tropical timber logs to the log pond in Kalabakan.

Route information
- Length: 340 km (210 mi)
- Existed: 1966–present

Major junctions
- Southeast end: Tawau
- FT 13 Federal Route 13; FT 500 Federal Route 500/Interior North–South Highway
- Northwest end: Keningau (continues as Kimanis–Keningau Highway, Pan Borneo Sabah Phase 3)

Location
- Country: Malaysia
- States: Sabah
- Divisions: Tawau Division; Sandakan Division; Interior Division
- Primary destinations: Kalabakan; Sapulut; Nabawan; Sook; Keningau

Highway system
- Highways in Malaysia; Expressways; Federal; State

The Tawau–Keningau Highway is one of the major federal highways in Sabah, Malaysia that connects the main city of Tawau to Keningau along the village in the Interior Division. Built in 2004 and expect to complete in mid-2007, it was to shorten the distance time from Kota Kinabalu to Tawau. It was part of the Pan Borneo Highway phase 3.

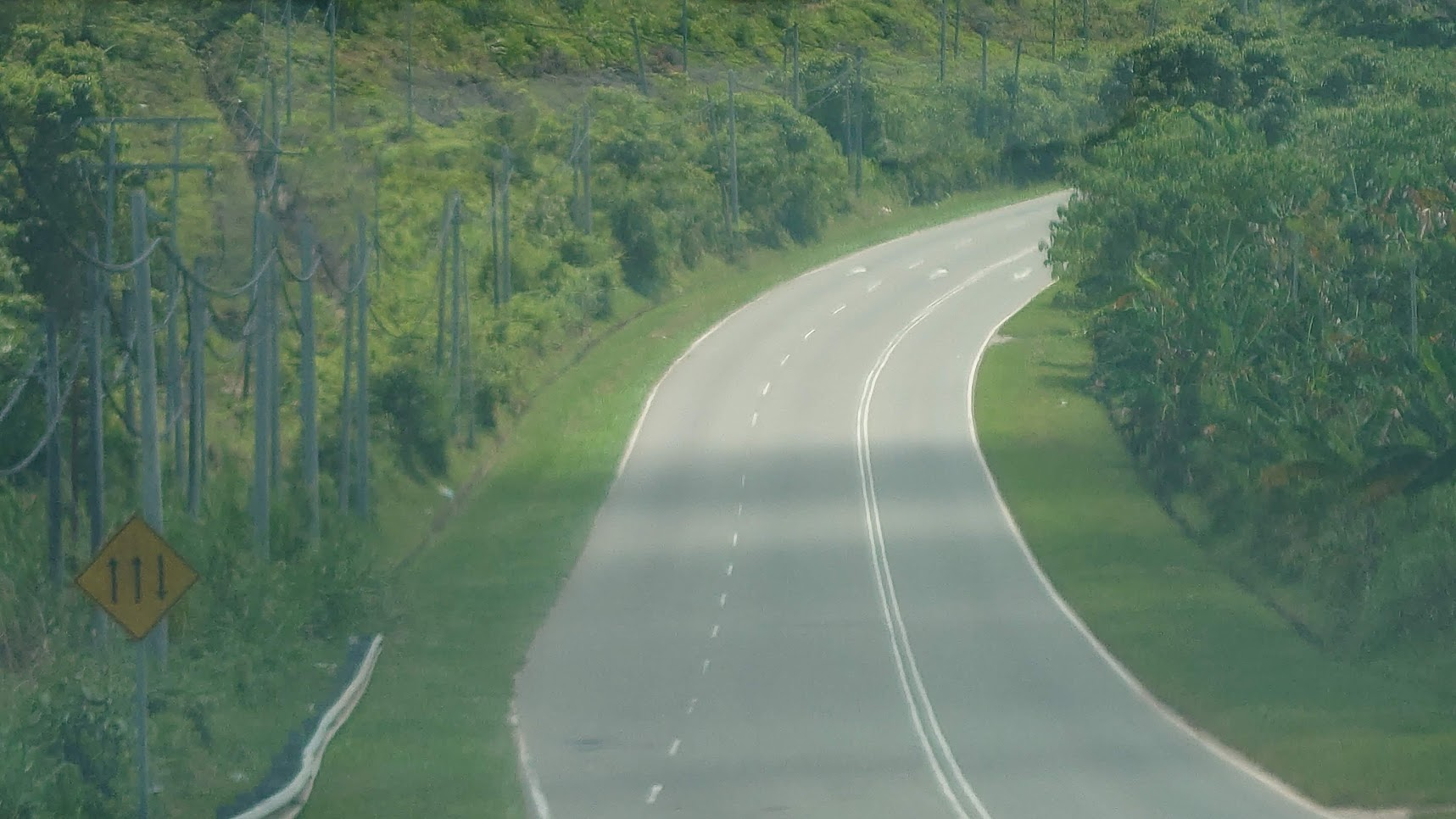
The Sook–Keningau Highway, in parts of Sook District. The road section is exceptionally undulating rolling hill as it also features climbing lane. It skirts through the foothill between the Trusmadi Range and Witti Range. The road is mostly under very good condition.

== History ==
On 5 December of 1966, The Keningau-Sapulut Road was started by the Australian Army Engineering Squadrons as an emergency project during the Indonesian Confrontation against Malaysia. They have worked on the project for the past two years and have completed sixty miles of the 76-miles project when their 22nd Construction Squadron pulled out recently as part of the post-confrontation withdrawal of Commonwealth Forces.

=== Modern history ===
In 2004, a road that spans on a longer length was built as a logging road before it was upgraded to a two-lane road and completed in 2008. It was built to connects between the town of Sapulut and Kalabakan.

== Route background ==
Tawau–Keningau Highway spans 340 kilometres (210 mi), starting from the east location of Tawau city centre then terminus west at Keningau. The highway traverses remote area where estate places were managed by oil palm plantation before crossing hilly terrain which only reach between 6% and 10% road grade before reaching town like Kalabakan, Sapulut, Nabawan and Sook.

Like most federal highway in Sabah, Tawau–Keningau Highway feature JKR R5 road standard.

=== Kalabakan–Sapulut Road ===
Kalabakan–Sapulut Road
- Jalan Kalabakan–Sapulut (In Malay)
- Elevation: 643 m (2,110 ft)

First Approach
- Length: 145 km (90 mi)
- Avg gradient: 6 %
- Max gradient: 10 %

Second Approach
- Traversed by: Maliau Basin

Third Approach
- Ascent from: Sapulut

Location
- Location: Maliau Basin Conservation Area
- Range: Witti Mountains (foothill)

Kalabakan–Sapulut Road is a two-lane road section, used to connect Kalabakan town to Sapulut. It starts from the Kalabakan Roundabout and terminus at Sapulut. Spanning roughly 145 kilometres (90 mi) from east to west, it traverses rugged, mountainous and remote area along the forest, and it takes roughly two hours thirty minute to reach between the town of Kalabakan to Sapulut. Although the highway was paved, it was quickly riddled with potholes, sink holes and uneven road shoulder on certain road segment due to how many times the road was used by logging truck.

Reaching 643 metres (2,110 ft) above sea level, nearby topography was a mountainous range covered by rainforest, which the road also climbs up to 10% gradient.

== Junction list ==
The entire route is located in Sabah.

Legend:

- I/C - Interchange, I/S - Intersection, RSA - Rest and service area, OBR - Overhead bridge restaurant, R/R - Restaurant and rest plaza, L/B - Layby, V/P - Vista point, TN - tunnel, T/P - Toll plaza, BR - Bridge
- C - Cloverleaf, S - Stack, T-A - Trumpet-A, T-B - Trumpet-B, DT - Directional-T/Y, SDT - Semi-Directional-T/Y, P-Y - Partial-Y, D - Diamond, P-C - Partial cloverleaf, D-D - Diverging diamond, D-R - Direct ramp

Division	District	Location	km	mi	Name	Destinations	Notes
Tawau	Tawau	Tawau			Tawau city centre	East; FT 13 Federal Route 13/SA51 Jalan Semporna – Kunak, Semporna, Lahad Datu, Sandakan North; Jalan Kuhara – Bombalai, Merotai, Kalabakan	Junctions; Start/end of dual-carriageway
Tawau	Tawau	Tawau			Tawau Museum	Jalan Utara	Roundabout; End/start of dual-carriageway
Tawau	Tawau	Tawau			Ria Height	Jalan Ria Height	T-junction
Tawau	Tawau	Tawau			Simpang Utara Baru	South; Jalan Kuhara – Tawau	Roundabout
Tawau	Tawau	Tawau			Kg. Indah		
Tawau	Tawau	Tawau			Bombalai		
Tawau	Tawau	Merotai			Merotai		Junctions
Tawau	Tawau	Merotai			-- m above sea level Tawau bound, Engage lower gear		
Tawau	Kalabakan	Kalabakan			Brantian		T-junction
Tawau	Kalabakan	Kalabakan			Kalabakan	Jalan Kalabakan	Roundabout
Tawau	Kalabakan	Kalabakan			-- m above sea level Kalabakan bound, Engage lower gear		
Tawau	Kalabakan	Kalabakan			Maliau Basin Conservation Area		Junctions
Interior	Nabawan	Sapulut			Sapulut	Jalan Sapulut Pensiangan – Salong, Pagalungan, Pensiangan	T-junction
Interior	Nabawan	Sapulut			Kg. Matiku		
Interior	Nabawan	Nabawan			Pandawan		
Interior	Nabawan	Nabawan			Nabawan	Jalan Nabawan Township	Roundabout
Interior	Nabawan	Nabawan			-- m above sea level Nabawan bound, Engage lower gear		
Interior	Sook	Sook			Sook town centre	Jalan Sook Tulid – Tulid, Lanas, Sinua, Sinaron, Tongod	Roundabout
Interior	Sook	Sook			Kg. Kebulu		T-junction
Interior	Sook	Sook			-- m above sea level Keningau bound, Engage lower gear		
Interior	Keningau	Keningau			Keningau town centre	FT 500 Federal Route 500/Interior North–South Highway – Melalap, Tenom, Tambunan, Kota Kinabalu, Ranau Northwest; Kimanis–Keningau Highway – Kimanis, Beaufort, Papar	Signalised T-junction
1.000 mi = 1.609 km; 1.000 km = 0.621 mi
