= Kimanis–Keningau Highway =

Road in Malaysia

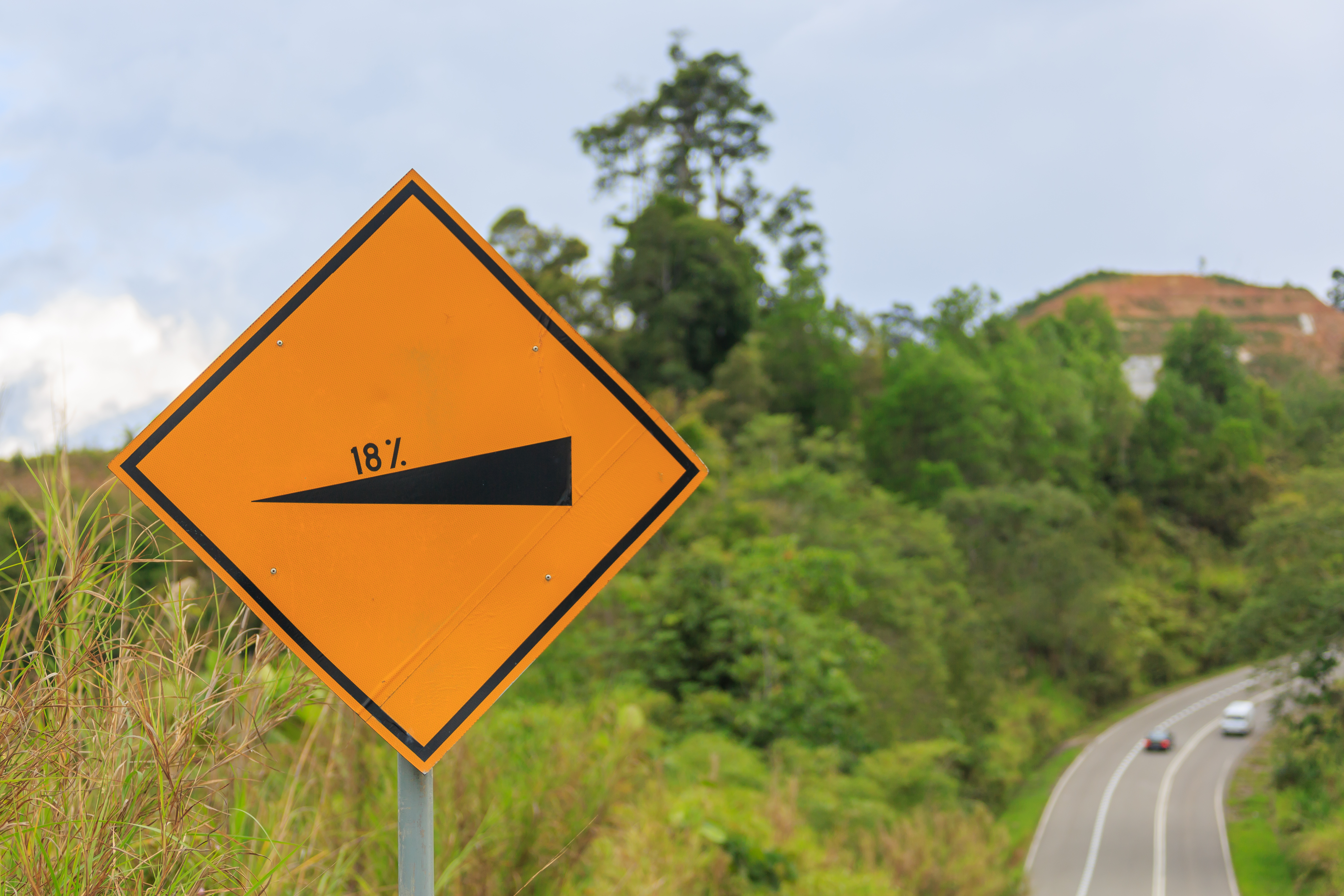
- One of the very steep slopes along the Kimanis-Keningau Highway.

Route information
- Length: 61 km (38 mi)

Major junctions
- West end: Kimanis
- FT 1 Federal Route 1 FT 500 Federal Route 500/Interior North–South Highway
- East end: Keningau

Location
- Country: Malaysia
- Primary destinations: Crocker Range National Park; Kota Kinabalu (from Keningau/Tenom); Keningau (main destination); Tenom (via Keningau)

Highway system
- Highways in Malaysia; Expressways; Federal; State

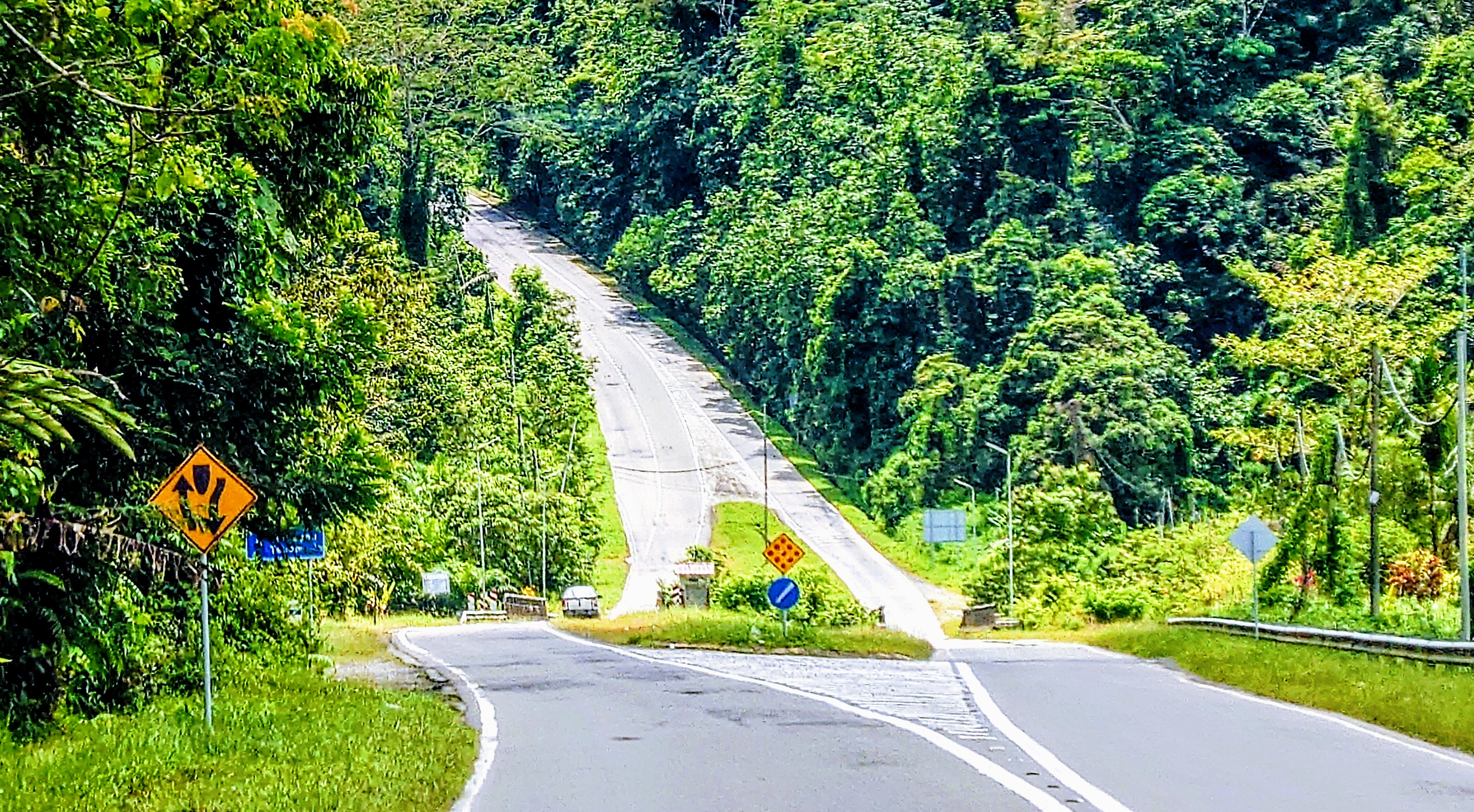
The road which passes through the bridge of Kimanis River close to the first climb of the highway, which takes about 16%.

Kimanis–Keningau Highway is a state highway in Sabah, Malaysia, connecting the town of Kimanis to Keningau. It also acts as an alternative for Federal Route 500 from Kota Kinabalu to Tenom which is nowadays somewhat under-use. The 53-kilometre (33 mi) highway from Ulu Kimanis began as a main logging road before being upgraded to a full two-lane highway. The highway was opened to traffic in 2006.

Even though the highway is relatively short and is in very good condition, it is notorious for its very steep gradients along the way, ranging from 10% to about 25%, making the Kimanis–Keningau Highway as the steepest highway in Malaysia. As a result, climbing road lanes are provided at steep sections.

A gravity hill induced by optical illusion is located 11 kilometres (6.8 mi) from Keningau. It is reported that at the gravity hill, there is a slope which appears as a downhill slope, but is actually an uphill slope.

== Route background ==
Kimanis–Keningau Highway starts from the Kimanis roundabout near Petronas on Federal Route 1 alongside Shell, and terminus at the city of Keningau. The highway crosses the high-altitude mountainous Crocker Range within the Crocker Range National Park boundary, up until 1,371 m (4,498 ft) above sea level, along a 6.5 km (4.0 mi) yellow line road markings for a fog zone, and gravity hill.

While the road takes about one hour and five minutes to one hour ten minutes using ordinary passenger vehicle, heavy-duty commercial lorry is two hour to three hours due to the highway's extreme steep gradient.

== Rest and restaurant stop ==
There are at least three popular stops along the highway:

- Jabatan Perhutanan Station
- Dimie Mountain resort
- Oyong Restaurant

These stops are popular for motorists especially lorries, buses and tourists. The punishing steep gradient made it necessary for the lorries to make frequent stops and replenish their water-cooling tanks. From the high vantage point of Dimie Resort, summit at 1,371 metres (4,498 ft), there is a panoramic view of the Brunei Bay and the Klias Bay to the west and glimpse of the Keningau Plain. The Liawan river and the Pampang river, which flow into the Keningau Plain, arise from the divide provided by the Crocker Range.

== Junction lists ==
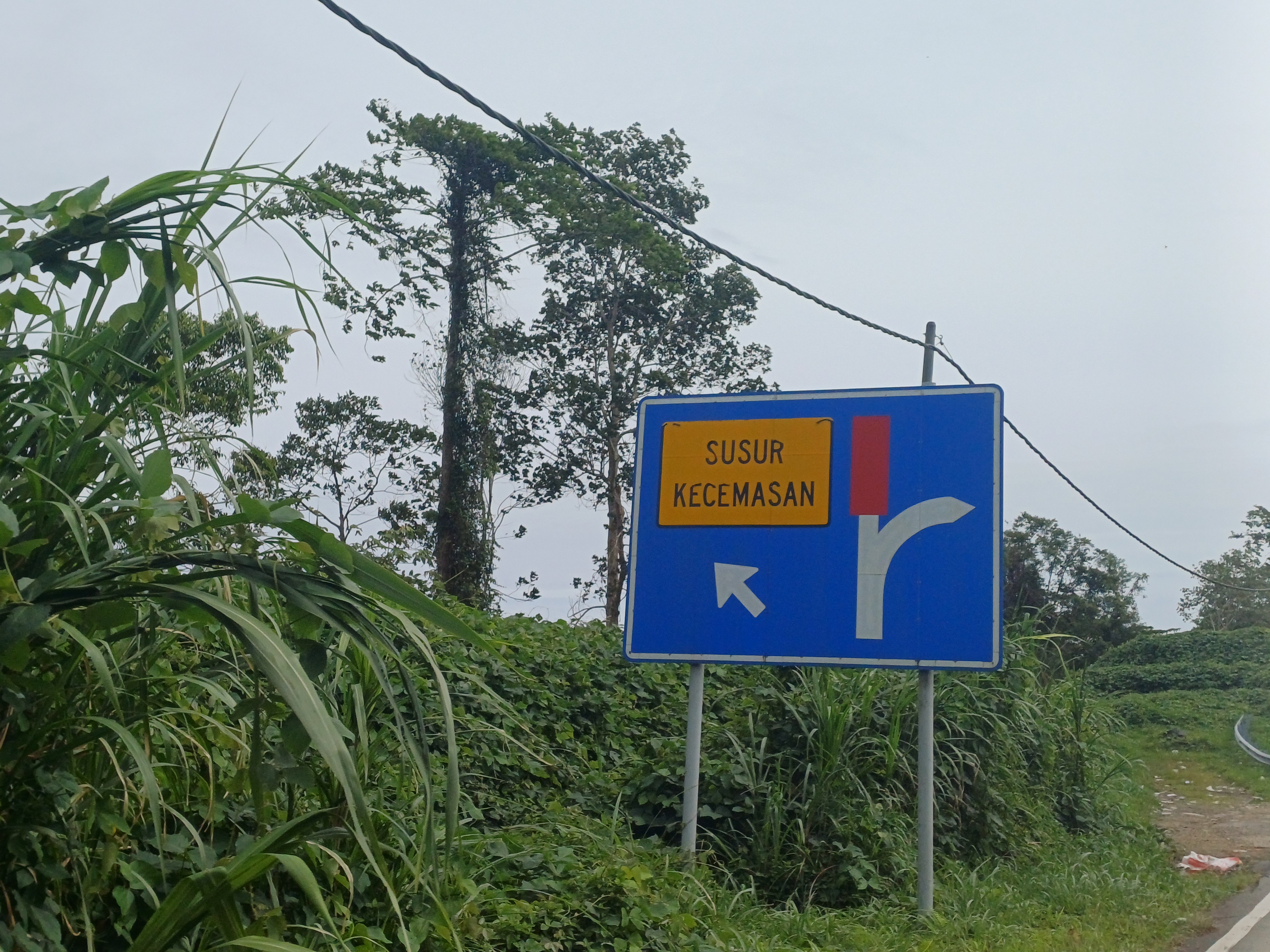
An emergency ramp in the Kimanis–Keningau Highway.

The entire route is located in Sabah.

Legend:

- I/C - Interchange, I/S - Intersection, RSA - Rest and service area, OBR - Overhead bridge restaurant, R/R - Restaurant and rest plaza, L/B - Layby, V/P - Vista point, TN - tunnel, T/P - Toll plaza, BR - Bridge
- C - Cloverleaf, S - Stack, T-A - Trumpet-A, T-B - Trumpet-B, DT - Directional-T/Y, SDT - Semi-Directional-T/Y, P-Y - Partial-Y, D - Diamond, P-C - Partial cloverleaf, D-D - Diverging diamond, D-R - Direct ramp

Division	District	Location	km	mi	Name	Destinations	Notes
West Coast	Papar	Kimanis			Kimanis	FT 1 Federal Route 1 – Kota Kinabalu, Papar, Beaufort, Sindumin	Roundabout
West Coast	Papar	Kimanis			Shell Layby (Keningau bound)		
West Coast	Papar	Kimanis			Ulu Kimanis	Jalan Bukit Manggis – Papar, Bongawan	Roundabout
West Coast	Papar	Kimanis			Kimanis–Keningau Highway R&R Complex (Kimanis bound)		
West Coast	Papar	Kimanis			Layby (Keningau bound)		
West Coast	Papar	Kimanis			-- m above sea level Kimanis bound, Engage lower gear		
Interior	Keningau	Keningau			-- m above sea level Keningau bound, Engage lower gear		
Interior	Keningau	Keningau			Crocker Range National Park -- m above sea level		
Interior	Keningau	Keningau			Jalan Masak Roundabout	Jalan Patikang Ulu – Tenom	Roundabout
Interior	Keningau	Keningau			Keningau	FT 500 Federal Route 500/Interior North–South Highway – Tambunan, Ranau, Kota Kinabalu, Tenom, Melalap, Sook	Roundabout
1.000 mi = 1.609 km; 1.000 km = 0.621 mi

== See also ==
- List of gravity hills

== Certain incidents ==
- The Kimanis–Keningau Highway was once closed in 2025, due to a landslides. Most motorists are also advised to use the Federal Route 500 until March 24 of 2025.

== Notes ==
- Many local people especially Keningau compare that Kimanis–Keningau Highway is like Mount Haruna or manga series Initial D under the fictional name Akina (秋名) because of their structure road is almost same with Mount Haruna.
