= Interior North–South Highway =

Road in Malaysia

Interior North–South Highway

Route information
- Length: 186 km (116 mi)

Major junctions
- Northwest end: Ranau (continues as Pan Borneo Highway)
- FT 22 Federal Route 22; FT 500 Federal Route 500; FT 501 Federal Route 501; SA2 Jalan Ranau–Tambunan; Kimanis–Keningau Highway; Tawau–Keningau Highway; SA3 Jalan Sipitang–Tenom; SA33 Jalan Paal–Kuala Tomani
- Southeast end: Kemabong (continues to Tomani)

Location
- Country: Malaysia
- Primary destinations: Tambunan, Keningau, Sook (continues to Tawau), Tenom

Highway system
- Highways in Malaysia; Expressways; Federal; State

Interior North–South Highway is a federal highway in Sabah, Malaysia, connecting Ranau to Kemabong. It serves as the main highway to replace Malaysia Federal Route 500 from Kota Kinabalu to towns and villages in the Interior Division of Sabah. The section between Ranau and Keningau runs through the valley parallel to the Crocker Range to the west and the Trusmadi Range to the east.

The length of the entire highway is expected to be about 186 kilometres (116 mi) for the Malaysian section.

== Junction lists ==
The entire route is located in Sabah.

Legend:

- I/C - Interchange, I/S - Intersection, RSA - Rest and service area, OBR - Overhead bridge restaurant, R/R - Restaurant and rest plaza, L/B - Layby, V/P - Vista point, TN - tunnel, T/P - Toll plaza, BR - Bridge
- C - Cloverleaf, S - Stack, T-A - Trumpet-A, T-B - Trumpet-B, DT - Directional-T/Y, SDT - Semi-Directional-T/Y, P-Y - Partial-Y, D - Diamond, P-C - Partial cloverleaf, D-D - Diverging diamond, D-R - Direct ramp

Division	District	Location	km	mi	Destinations	Notes
West Coast	Ranau	Ranau			FT 22 Federal Route 22 – Kundasang, Tamparuli, Kota Kinabalu, Mamut, Telupid, Beluran, Sandakan, Lahad Datu, Tawau	Junctions
West Coast	Ranau	Ranau			Jalan Randagong	Junctions
West Coast	Ranau	Ranau			-- m above sea level Tambunan bound, Engage lower gear	
Interior	Tambunan	Tambunan			FT 500 Jalan Tambunan–Kota Kinabalu – Penampang, Kota Kinabalu	Roundabout
Interior	Tambunan	Tambunan			Tambunan town centre	Roundabout
Interior	Tambunan	Tambunan			-- m above sea level Keningau bound, Engage lower gear	
Interior	Keningau	Keningau			Apin-Apin	Junctions
Interior	Keningau	Keningau			Bingkor	Roundabout
Interior	Keningau	Keningau			Keningau Town Hospital	Roundabout
Interior	Keningau	Keningau			Kimanis–Keningau Highway – Crocker Range National Park, Kimanis, Kota Kinabalu, Papar, Beaufort	Roundabout
Interior	Keningau	Keningau			Tawau–Keningau Highway – Sook, Nabawan, Sapulut, Kalabakan, Tawau	Signalised T-junction
Interior	Keningau	Keningau			Jalan Patikang Ulu – Kimanis	T-junction
Interior	Keningau	Keningau			Senagang	Junctions
Interior	Tenom	Tenom			Melalap	
Interior	Tenom	Tenom			Jalan Tenom-Ponontomon – Ponontomon, Sabah Agriculture Park	Roundabout
Interior	Tenom	Tenom			SA3 Jalan Sipitang–Tenom – Sipitang, Sindumin, Lawas	Roundabout
Interior	Tenom	Kemabong			Kemabong town centre	Roundabout
Interior	Tenom	Kemabong			-- m above sea level Tenom bound, Engage Lower Gear	
1.000 mi = 1.609 km; 1.000 km = 0.621 mi: Concurrency terminus

== See also ==
- Federal Route 500
