= Malaysia Federal Route 500 =

Road in Sabah, Malaysia

Federal Route 500

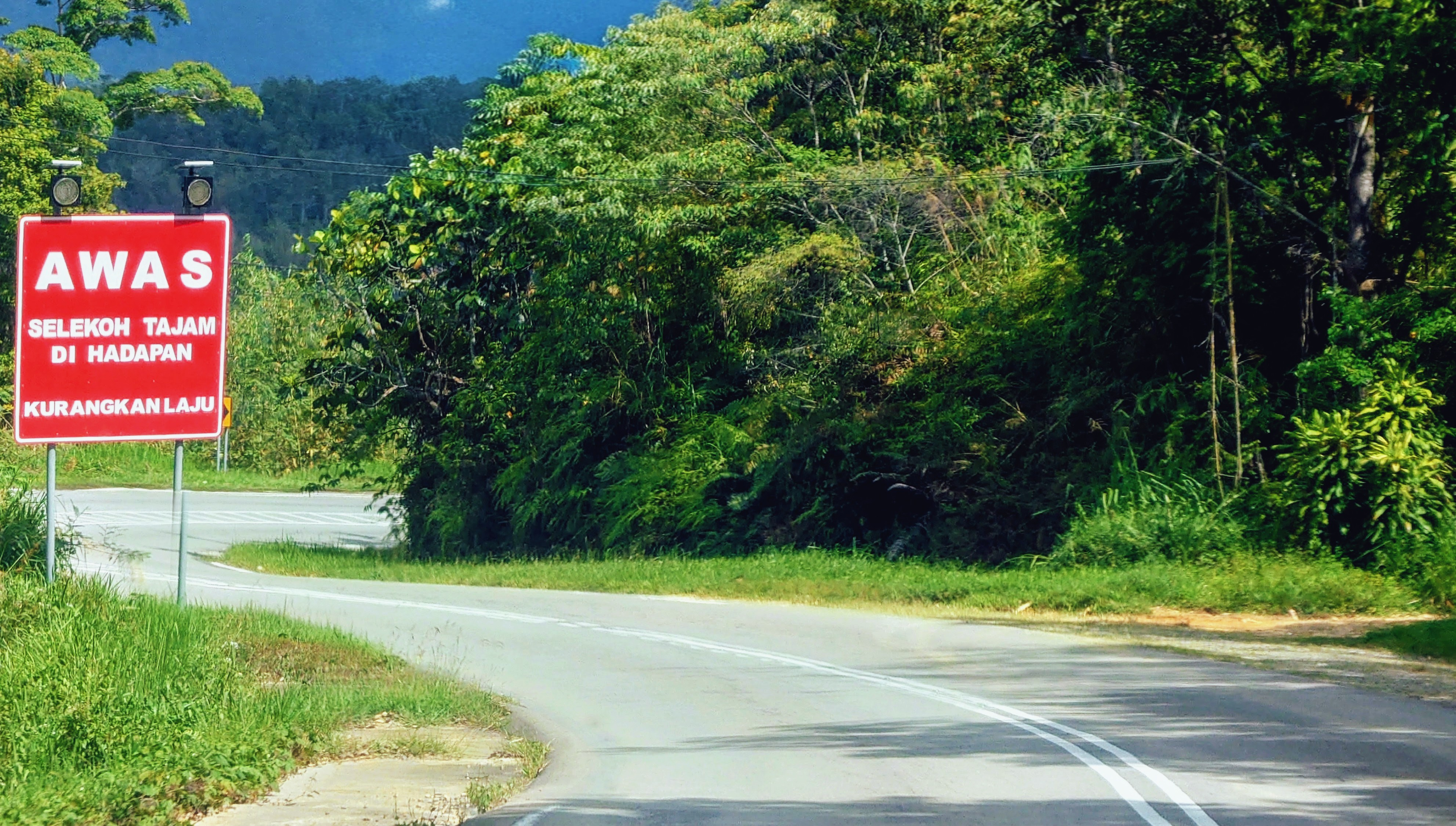
- Within the mountainous area of the highway, named the Sunsuron Pass. Although less congested, almost every section lacks climbing lane as there is only frequent hairpin turn which can make all vehicle slow down behind a lorry.

Route information
- Maintained by Malaysian Public Works Department
- Length: 163.7 km (101.7 mi)

Major junctions
- Northwest end: Kota Kinabalu
- FT 1 Federal Route 1 FT 501 Jalan Penampang; SA2 Jalan Ranau–Tambunan; Kimanis–Keningau Highway; Interior North–South Highway; Tawau–Keningau Highway
- Southeast end: Tenom (continues as Tenom–Sipitang Highway)

Location
- Country: Malaysia
- Primary destinations: Penampang, Tambunan, Keningau, Sook

Highway system
- Highways in Malaysia; Expressways; Federal; State

Federal Route 500 is a 163-kilometre (101 mi) federal highway in Sabah, Malaysia, connecting Kota Kinabalu to Tenom. It serves as the main highway from Kota Kinabalu to towns and villages in the Interior Division of Sabah.

== History ==
The road to the interior is once a dirt road (known as salt trail) in the 1960s before being upgraded to a two-lane paved single carriageway. Historically, Federal Route 500 is also formerly known as Sabah State Route SA3, which was a much longer state highway in Sabah.

While the original Route SA3 is longer, only the section between Kota Kinabalu to Tenom is recommissioned as a federal highway; the section between Tenom to Paal retains its state highway code, while the remaining section from Paal to Kuala Tomani was renumbered as Route SA33, following the completion of Tenom–Sipitang Highway in 2007 which then commissioned as part of Sabah State Route SA3. Today, State Route SA3 is a 71 km (44 mi) state highway used to connect Tenom to Sipitang.

== Route background ==
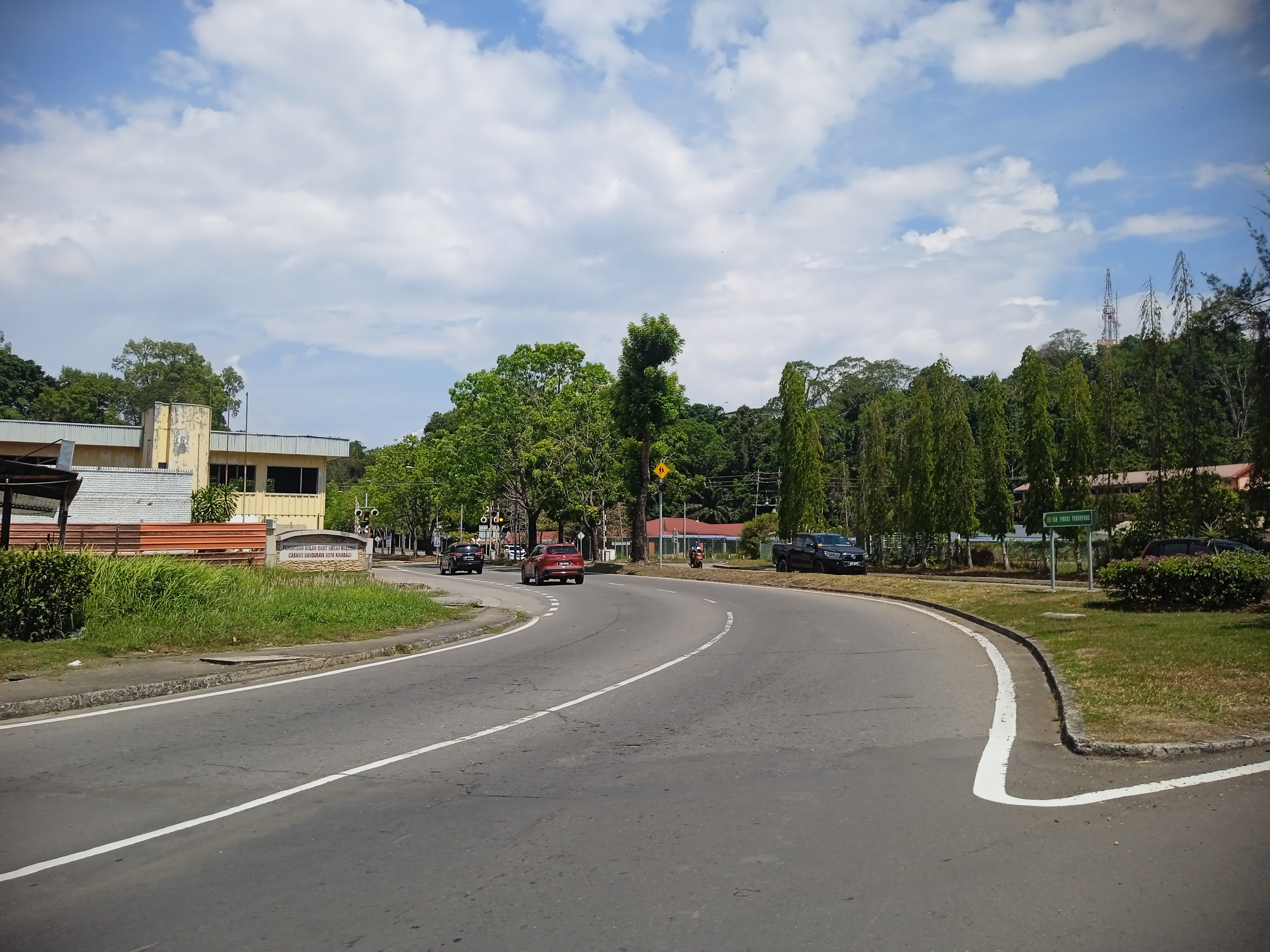
Pintas Penampang Highway, also called Penampang Bypass, start at Sembulan roundabout as well as a tunnel at the distance.

Federal Route 500 started at the city centre of Kota Kinabalu, and terminus at the town centre of Tenom. The highway started as an urban highway, named Pintas Highway (Malay: Jalan Pintas).

=== Penampang–Tambunan Highway ===
Penampang–Tambunan Highway is a 71 kilometres (44 mi) two-lane single carriageway road section, connecting the town of Penampang to Tambunan. Being a mountainous road in the West Coast Division of Sabah, it crosses the Crocker Range at high-altitude, over the summit of 1,716 m (5,630 ft) near Mount Alab, within the boundary of Crocker Range National Park. Being moderately steep, the road gradient ranges from 6% to 10% as the highway features frequencies bend though some section can also hit 15% in Penampang District which are highly steep, as well some parts can view a glimpse of the Kota Kinabalu city and South China Sea. While almost all roads don't feature straight climbs, a traditional climbing lane were also provide, only in Tambunan District near Rafflesia Forest Reserve.

Being the highest road in the state, most rugged mountainous section is prone to landslide. It was also one of the highways in Sabah that was frequently close or upgrade.

=== The interior stretch ===
The road which runs west to east from Keningau to Tenom was an undulating hilly road which lacks a truck lane.

== List of interchanges ==
Km	Exit	Interchange	To	Remarks
		Kota Kinabalu; Harbour City	Northeast; FT 1 Coastal Highway; Kota Kinabalu city centre Southwest; Tanjung Aru; Kota Kinabalu International Airport	Signalised intersection Start/end of dual-carriageway
		Kota Kinabalu; Sembulan Roundabout	Jalan Pintas Penampang Northeast; Kota Kinabalu city centre FT 501 Jalan Penampang Southwest; Jalan Mat Salleh; Tanjung Aru	Roundabout
		Tunnel		
		Queen Elizabeth Hospital	Queen Elizabeth Hospital	Roundabout
		Taman Waja	Taman Waja	Roundabout
		Kota Kinabalu; Jalan Lintas Intersection	Northeast; FT 1 Jalan Lintas; Inanam; Tuaran; Kudat Southwest; Tanjung Aru; Papar; Beaufort	Signalised intersection
		Grand Millennium Plaza		
		Donggongon	North; FT 501 Jalan Penampang; Penampang; Kota Kinabalu South; FT 501 Lok Kawi; FT 1 Papar; FT 1 Beaufort	Roundabout; End/start of dual-carriageway
		Stadium Penampang	Stadium Penampang; Majlis Daerah Penampang; Sabah Cultural Center	Roundabout
		Kibabaig	North; Kibabaig; Minintod; Inanam; Bukit Padang	Roundabout
		Kg. Madasiang		
		Kg. Babagon	Babagon Dam	T-junction
		Kg. Moyog		
		-- m above sea level		Kota Kinabalu bound, Engage lower gear
		Kipandi Butterfly Park -- m above sea level		
			Northeast; Jalan Tudan Poring; Kiulu	Junction
		Gunung Alab R&R complex		R&R complex Kota Kinabalu bound
		Rafflesia Info Center -- m above sea level		Tambunan bound
		Tambunan Forestry		
		Masakob Waterfall		
		-- m above sea level		Tambunan bound, Engage lower gear
		Kg. Sinsuron		
		Tambunan; Tambunan Roundabout	Northeast; SA2 Jalan Ranau–Tambunan; FT 22 Ranau; FT 22 Kundasang; FT 22 Sandakan	Roundabout
		Tambunan	Tambunan town centre	Roundabout
		-- m above sea level		Keningau bound, Engage lower gear
		Apin-Apin		Junctions
		Bingkor		Roundabout
		Keningau District Hospital	Keningau District Hospital	Roundabout; Start/end of dual-carriageway
		Keningau	Northwest; Kimanis–Keningau Highway; Crocker Range National Park; Kimanis; Papar; Beaufort; Kota Kinabalu	Roundabout
		Keningau; Jalan Keningau–Sook	Southeast; Tawau–Keningau Highway; Sook; Nabawan; Sapulut; Kalabakan; Tawau	Signalised T-junction
		Jalan Patikang Ulu	Jalan Patikang Ulu; Kimanis	T-junction; End/start of dual-carriageway
		Senagang -- m above sea level		Tenom bound, Engage lower gear
		Melalap		
		Tenom	Tenom town centre Ponontomon; Sabah Agriculture Park	Roundabout
			Southwest; SA3 Jalan Tenom–Sipitang; Sipitang; Sindumin; Lawas South; SA33 Jalan Paal–Kuala Tomani; Kemabong; Kuala Tomani	

== Road upgrades ==
The highway will be upgraded with a flyover to replace the Sigah Roundabout in Donggongon Town. The project began on 25 October 2022 and was expected to be completed on October 2026.

== Gallery ==
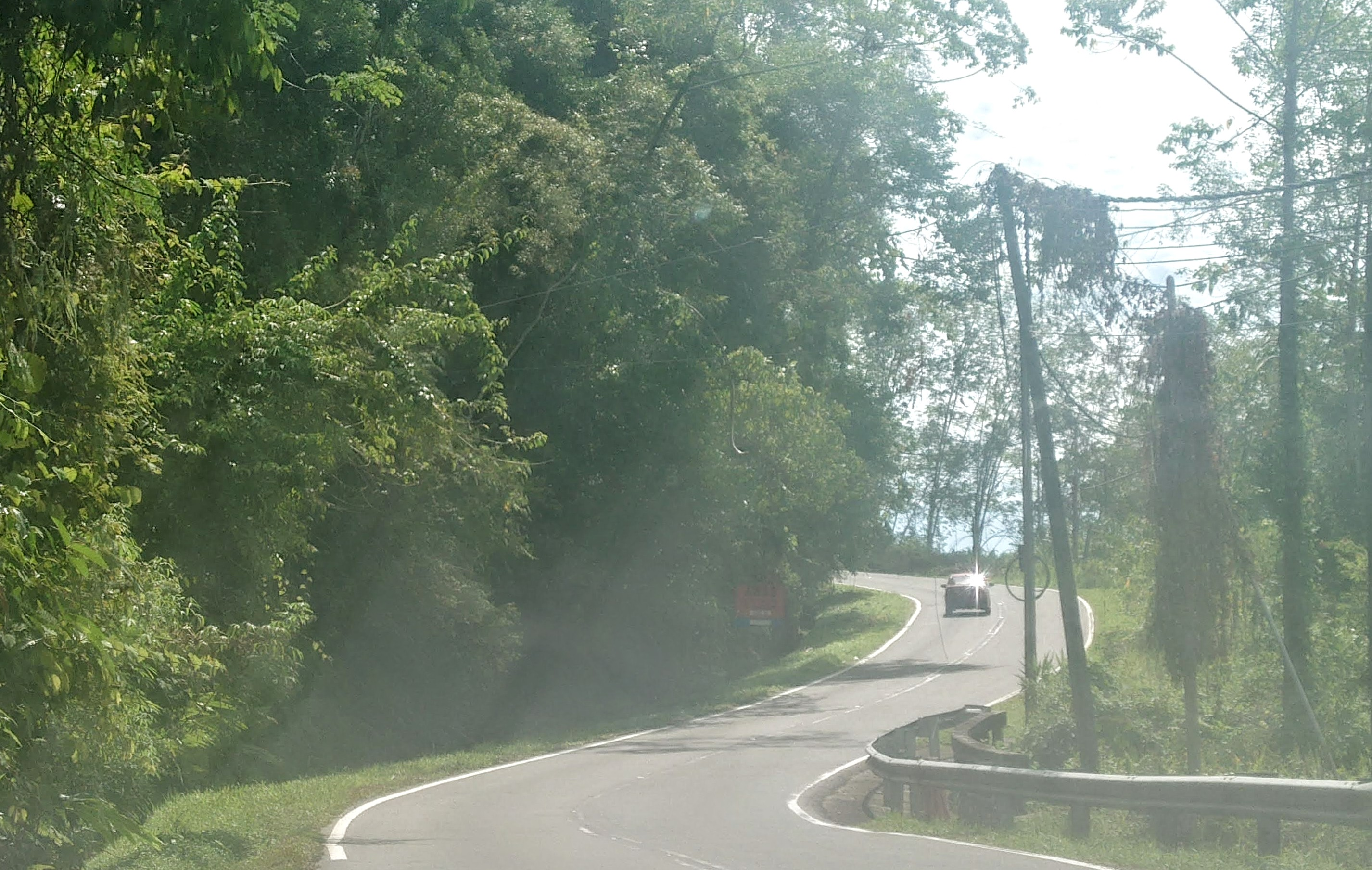
Penampang–Tambunan Highway is one of the five highways in Sabah that crosses the Crocker Range; the Tamparuli–Ranau Highway, Kimanis–Keningau Highway and Sipitang–Tenom Highway are the other three, and the new highway, Interior North–South Highway.

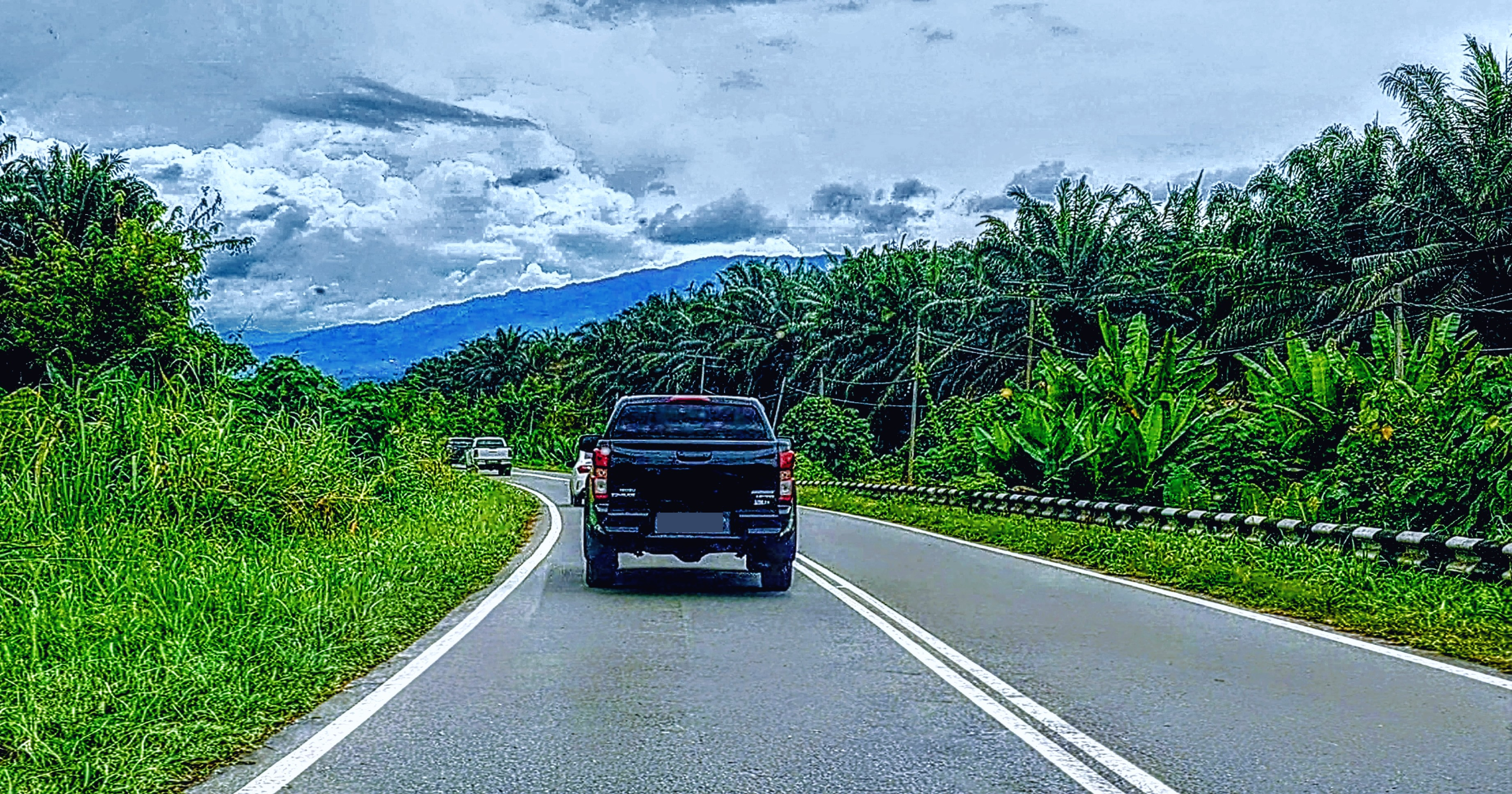
Keningau–Tenom Highway which passes nearby estate and plantation, running parallel between the Crocker Range and Witti Range.

== See also ==
- Kimanis–Keningau Highway
