= Mahua Waterfall =

- Air Terjun Mahua
- Location: Kg. Patau, Tambunan District, Sabah, Malaysia
- Coordinates: 5°47′48.34″N 116°24′30.265″E
- Type: Plunge
- Total height: 17 m (56 ft)

Mahua Waterfall (Malay: Air Terjun Mahua) is a plunge type waterfall located in Patau Village, Tambunan District of Sabah, Malaysia within the Crocker Range National Park administered by Sabah Parks under the state Ministry of Tourism, Culture and Environment. The waterfall has a height of 17 metres (56 ft) with 1.2 metres deep which became one of the ecotourism attractions for the district as well for Sabah.

== Tourism ==
Mahua Waterfall is one of Sabah's nature attractions which has been opened to the public since 2003 and become tourist destination for both local and foreign visitors. In 2006, the waterfall received 5,022 visitors which later increased to 14,000 in 2013.

== See also ==
- List of waterfalls
