= Malaysia Federal Route 22 =

Road in Malaysia

Federal Route 22

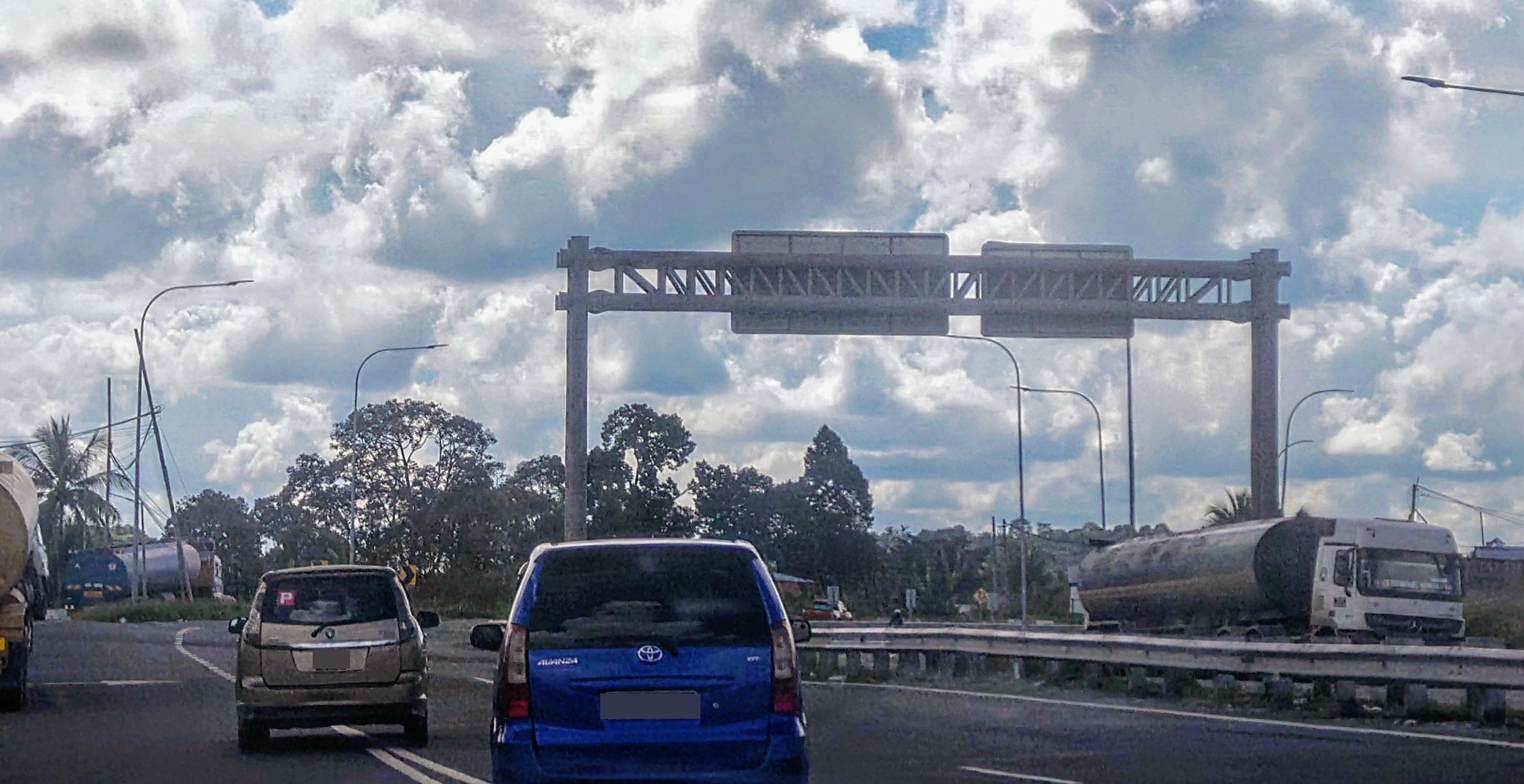
- Checkpoint Mile 32, Sandakan.

Route information
- Part of AH150
- Maintained by Malaysian Public Works Department
- Length: 310 km (190 mi)
- Existed: 1968–present
- History: Completed in 1982

Major junctions
- West end: Tamparuli, Tuaran
- FT 1 / AH150 Federal Route 1 SA2 Jalan Tambunan/Interior North–South Highway; FT 13 Federal Route 13
- East end: Sandakan

Location
- Country: Malaysia
- Primary destinations: Kundasang, Kinabalu Park, Ranau (Continues as Interior North–South Highway), Telupid, Beluran

Highway system
- Highways in Malaysia; Expressways; Federal; State

Federal Route 22, Asian Highway Route AH150 (formerly Federal Route A4), is a 310-kilometre (193 mi) federal highway in Sabah, Malaysia, which is also a component of the larger Pan-Borneo Highway network. It starts from Tamparuli and ends at Sandakan. The section running from Tamparuli to Ranau, which is known as Tamparuli–Ranau Highway, crosses the Crocker Range just to the south of Mount Kinabalu, as well as a frequent climbing lanes, and summit at 1,563 m (5,128 ft) near Kinabalu National Park.

== History ==
The construction of the Federal Route 22 began in 1968 as a joint project between the Malaysian federal government with the government of Australia, known as the "Malaysian-Australian Road Project" (MARP). It was one of the two projects being jointly carried out with the Australian government, together with the Pergau Dam project in Kelantan, with the total cost of RM25 million for both projects. The construction was done in two phases - the construction of the first phase from Sandakan to Telupid began in 1968 and completed in 1971, while the second phase from Telupid to Ranau was constructed in 1971 and completed in 1972. Both sections were paved in 1973 and were completed in 1978. Meanwhile, the final section of the FT22 highway from Ranau to Tamparuli was constructed right after the Sandakan-Ranau section was opened to motorists. The Tamparuli-Ranau section was completed in 1982. The highway was coded as A4 according to the old numbering scheme, but was later changed to FT22 in 1996 to standardise the route numbering system with Peninsular Malaysia.

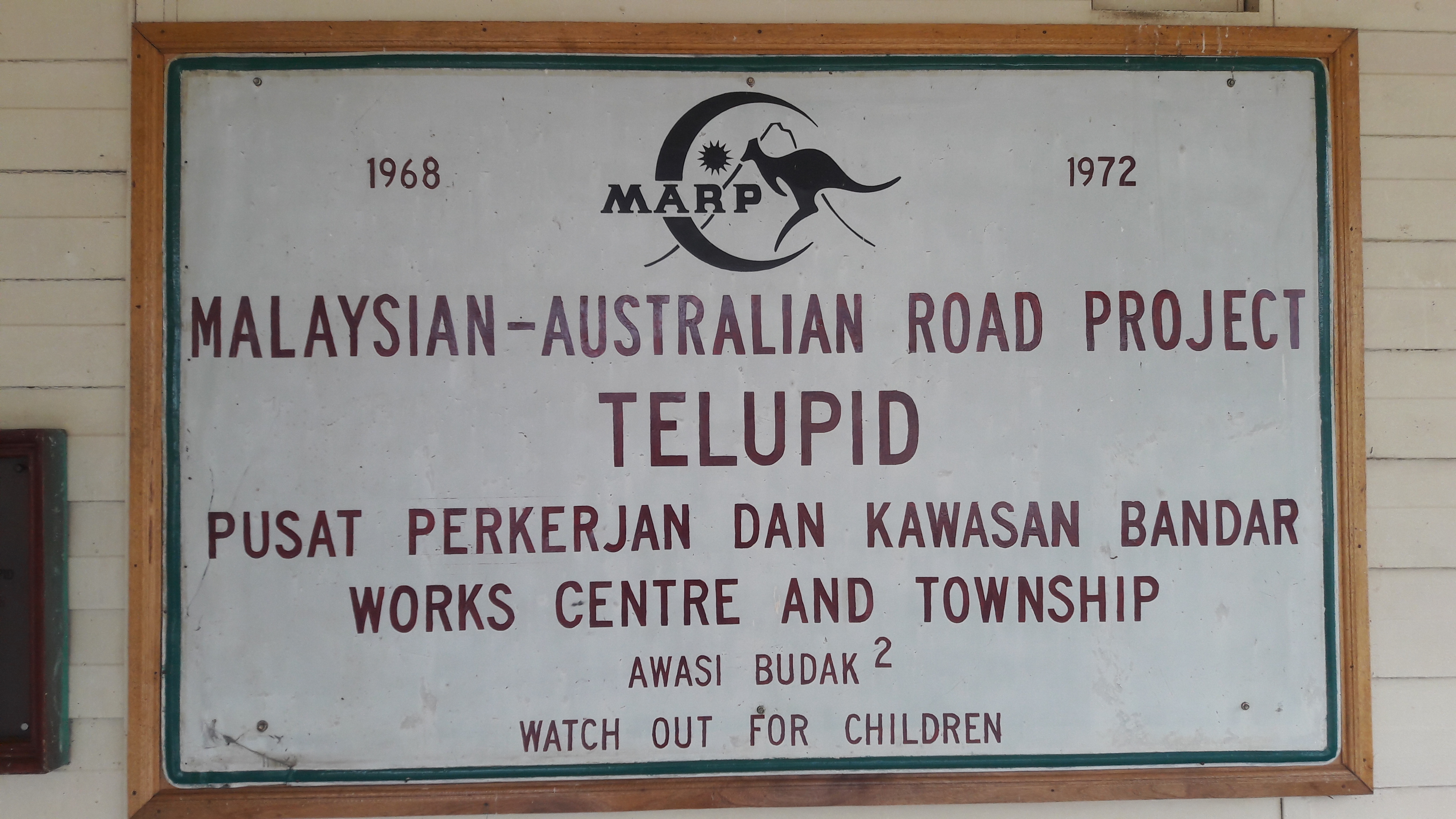
Malaysian-Australian Road Project (MARP) signboard at the entrance to Public Works Department (Telupid district) office

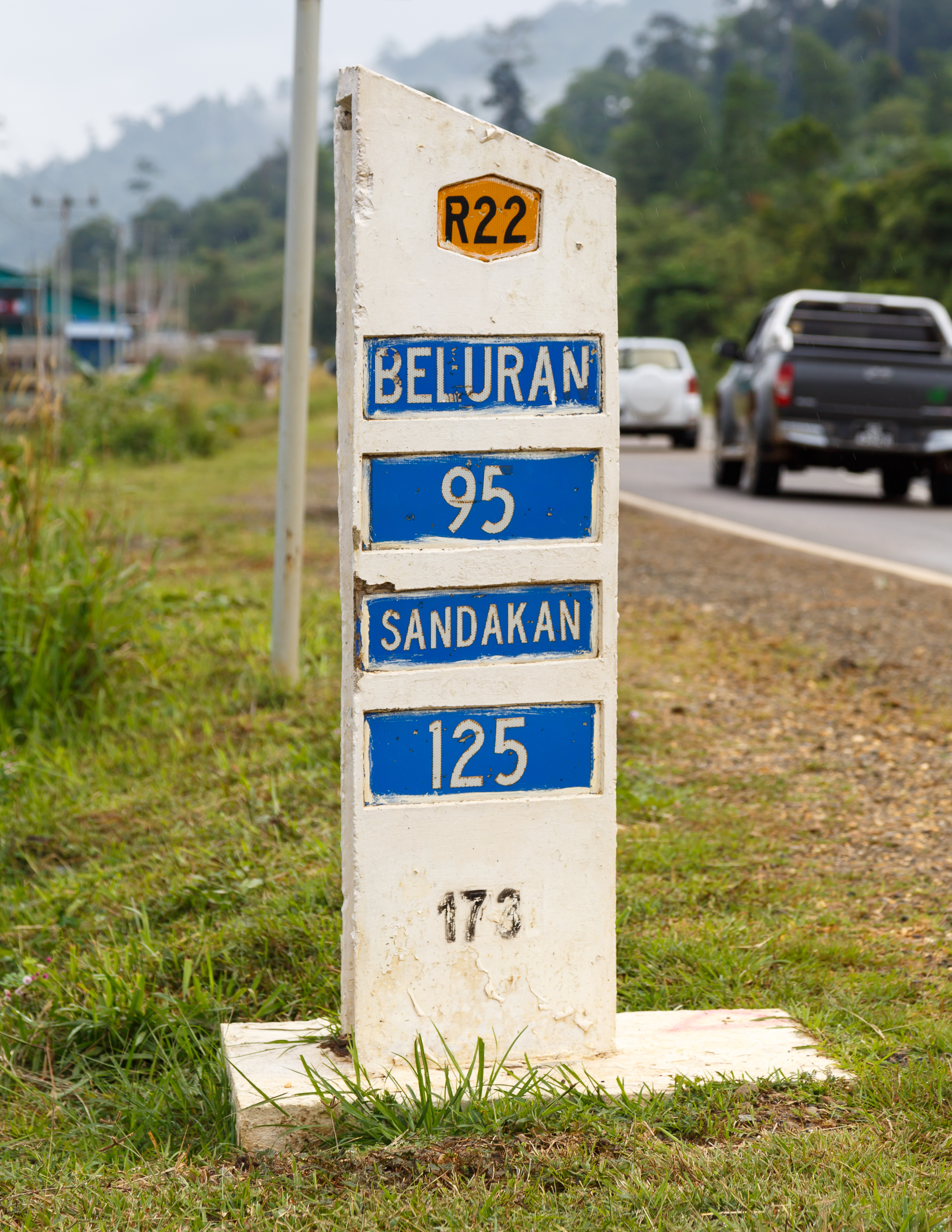
Milestone of Malaysia Federal Route 22 at Telupid

== Junction lists ==
The entire route is located in Sabah.

Legend:

- I/C - Interchange, I/S - Intersection, RSA - Rest and service area, OBR - Overhead bridge restaurant, R/R - Restaurant and rest plaza, L/B - Layby, V/P - Vista point, TN - tunnel, T/P - Toll plaza, BR - Bridge
- C - Cloverleaf, S - Stack, T-A - Trumpet-A, T-B - Trumpet-B, DT - Directional-T/Y, SDT - Semi-Directional-T/Y, P-Y - Partial-Y, D - Diamond, P-C - Partial cloverleaf, D-D - Diverging diamond, D-R - Direct ramp

Division	District	Location	km	mi	Name	Destinations	Notes
West Coast	Tuaran	Tamparuli	0.0	0.0	Tamparuli; Berungis I/S	FT 503 / AH150 Federal Route 503 – Kota Belud, Tuaran FT 1 / AH150 Federal Route 1 – Kota Kinabalu	Roundabout; Start/end of dual-carriageway
West Coast	Tuaran	Tamparuli			Tamparuli town centre	Jalan Tamparuli Lama – Tamparuli town centre, Kiulu	Roundabout; End/start of dual-carriageway
West Coast	Tuaran	Tamparuli			Tamparuli–Ranau I/S	FT 1 Kota Belud–Tamparuli Highway – Topokon, Kota Belud Jalan Tamparuli Lama – Tamparuli town centre, Kiulu	Roundabout
West Coast	Tuaran	Tamparuli			-- m above sea level Tamparuli bound, Engage lower gear		
West Coast	Kota Belud	Nabalu			Jalan Ranau Bypass	Jalan Ranau Bypass – Taginambur, Kota Belud	T-junctions
West Coast	Kota Belud	Nabalu			Pekan Nabalu	Nabalu fruits and handcraft centre	
West Coast	Kota Belud	Kiau			Kg. Kiau		Junction
West Coast	Kota Belud	Kiau			-- m above sea level Kundasang bound, Engage lower gear		
West Coast	Ranau	Bundu Tuhan			Bundu Tuhan		T-junctions
West Coast	Ranau	Bundu Tuhan			Kinabalu Park		T-junctions
West Coast	Ranau	Kundasang			Kundasang	Kundasang town centre, Kundasang War Memorial	Junctions
West Coast	Ranau	Kundasang			-- m above sea level Ranau bound, Engage lower gear		
West Coast	Ranau	Ranau			Ranau	Ranau town centre	Roundabout
West Coast	Ranau	Ranau			Ranau–Telupid I/S	Mamut FT 500 / FT 501 Interior North–South Highway – Tambunan, Keningau	Junctions
West Coast	Ranau	Ranau			Lohan	Lohan, Kg. Bongkud, Poring	T-junctions
West Coast	Ranau	Ranau			Kg. Luanti	Sabah Tea Plantation	T-junctions
West Coast	Ranau	Ranau			Kg Nalapak		Junction
West Coast	Ranau	Ranau			-- m above sea level Sandakan bound, Engage lower gear		
Sandakan	Telupid	Telupid			Telupid	Telupid town centre, Jalan Telupid–Tongod – Tongod; Pinangah	T-junctions
Sandakan	Telupid	Telupid			Sg. Sapi Forest Reserve		
Sandakan	Telupid	Telupid			Jalan Sapi–Nangoh	Sapi–Nangoh Highway – Kg. Ulu Sapi, Pamol Estate, Paitan, Pitas, Kota Marudu	Roundabout
Sandakan	Beluran	Beluran			Kampung Ulu Memanjang		
Sandakan	Sandakan	Sandakan			Jalan Beluran	Jalan Beluran – Beluran	T-junctions
Sandakan	Sandakan	Sandakan			Road Transport Department Malaysia (JPJ) Enforcement Stations (Sandakan bound)		
Sandakan	Sandakan	Sandakan			Shell Layby (Tamparuli bound)		
Sandakan	Sandakan	Sandakan			Sandakan Mile 32 Checkpoint R&R		
Sandakan	Sandakan	Sandakan			Mile 32	FT 13 Sandakan–Tawau Highway – Kinabatangan, Lahad Datu, Kunak, Semporna, Tawau	Interchange
Sandakan	Sandakan	Sandakan			Ulu Dusun (Mile 30)		
Sandakan	Sandakan	Sandakan			Gum-Gum (Mile 16)		
Sandakan	Sandakan	Sandakan			Sepilok (Mile 14)	Rainforest Discovery Centre – Sepilok Orangutan Rehabilitation Centre	Roundabout
Sandakan	Sandakan	Sandakan			Jalan Sungai Manila	Jalan Sungai Manila – Kampung Rancangan Sungai Manila, Kampung Dandulit	T-junctions
Sandakan	Sandakan	Sandakan			Jalan Sungai Batang	Jalan Sungai Batang – Sandakan Educational Hub, Kampung Sungai Batang, Kampung Padas	T-junctions
Sandakan	Sandakan	Sandakan			Bandar Sibuga Jaya (Mile 8)		
Sandakan	Sandakan	Sandakan			Jalan Lintas Labuk	Jalan Lintas Labuk – Sandakan Airport , Bandar Sibuga Jaya, Sibuga, Batu Sapi	Roundabout
Sandakan	Sandakan	Sandakan			Sandakan Airport; Sri Labuk Roundabout	Jalan Lapangan Terbang Sandakan – Sandakan Argiculture Department, Taman Fajar, Taman Airport; Sandakan Airport	Roundabout; Start/end of dual-carriageway
Sandakan	Sandakan	Sandakan			Mile 2, Jalan Utara	Jalan Utara – BDC, Taman Grandview, Sim-Sim, Sandakan town centre, Duchess Of Kent Hospital	Junctions
Sandakan	Sandakan	Sandakan			Sandakan	Lebuh Tiga – Sandakan town centre	Roundabout; End/start of dual-carriageway
1.000 mi = 1.609 km; 1.000 km = 0.621 mi: Concurrency terminus

== Gallery ==
Heavy traffic along the route near Tamparuli. The route is frequently used by various commuters, in addition to tourists, although the route is mountainous, note the three-lanes climbing road lane. This includes heavy vehicles such as trucks and lorries.

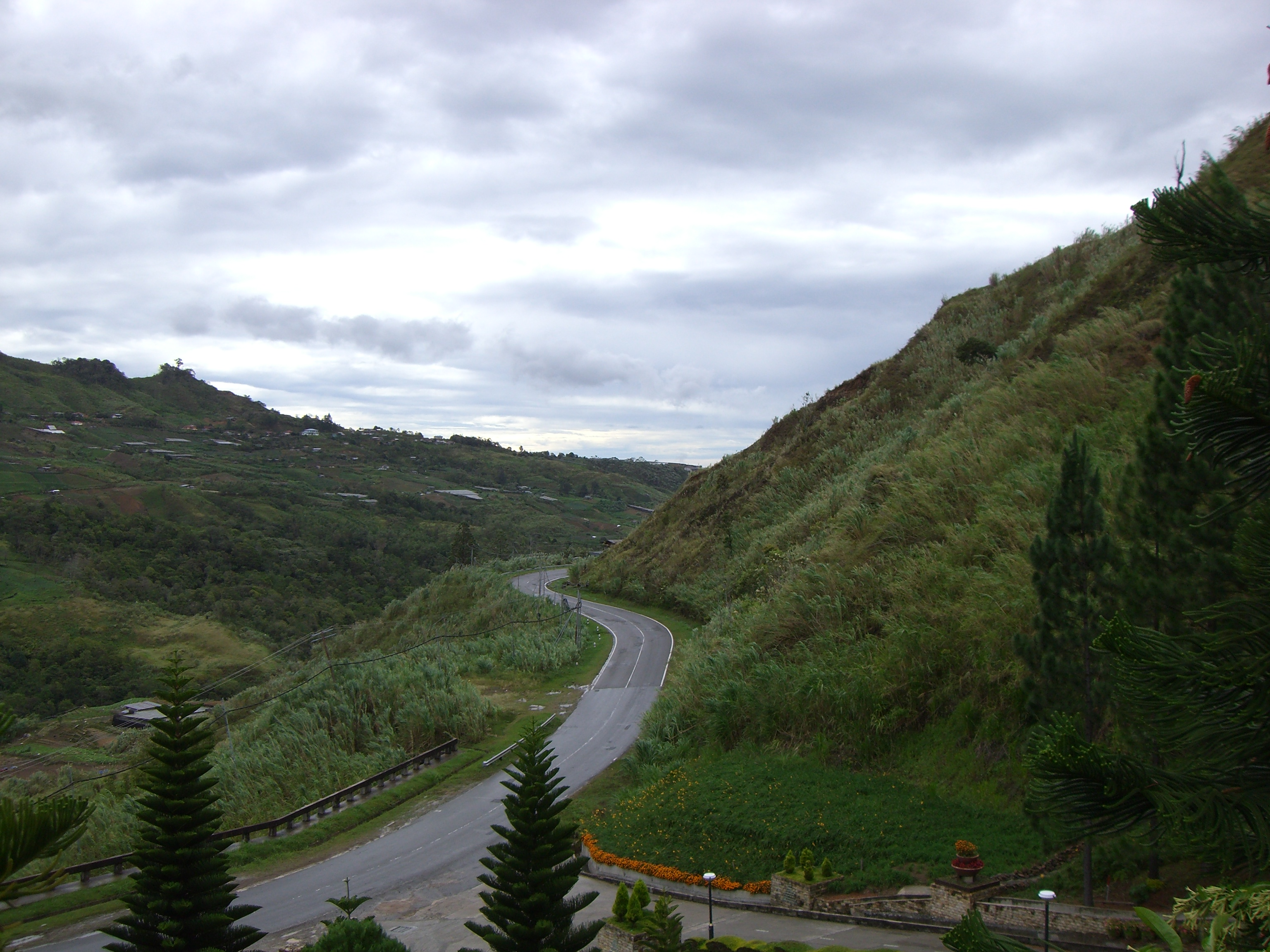
A view of the Ranau-Kota Kinabalu section of Federal Route 22 near Kundasang

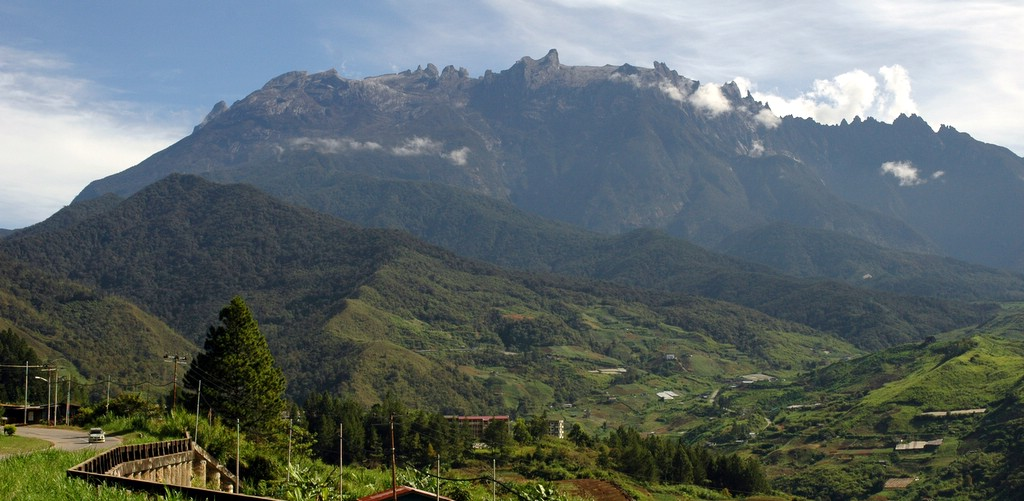
Mount Kinabalu as seen from the due south. Taken from Federal Route 22 in Kundasang
