= Melalap, Malaysia =

Place in Sabah, Malaysia

Melalap
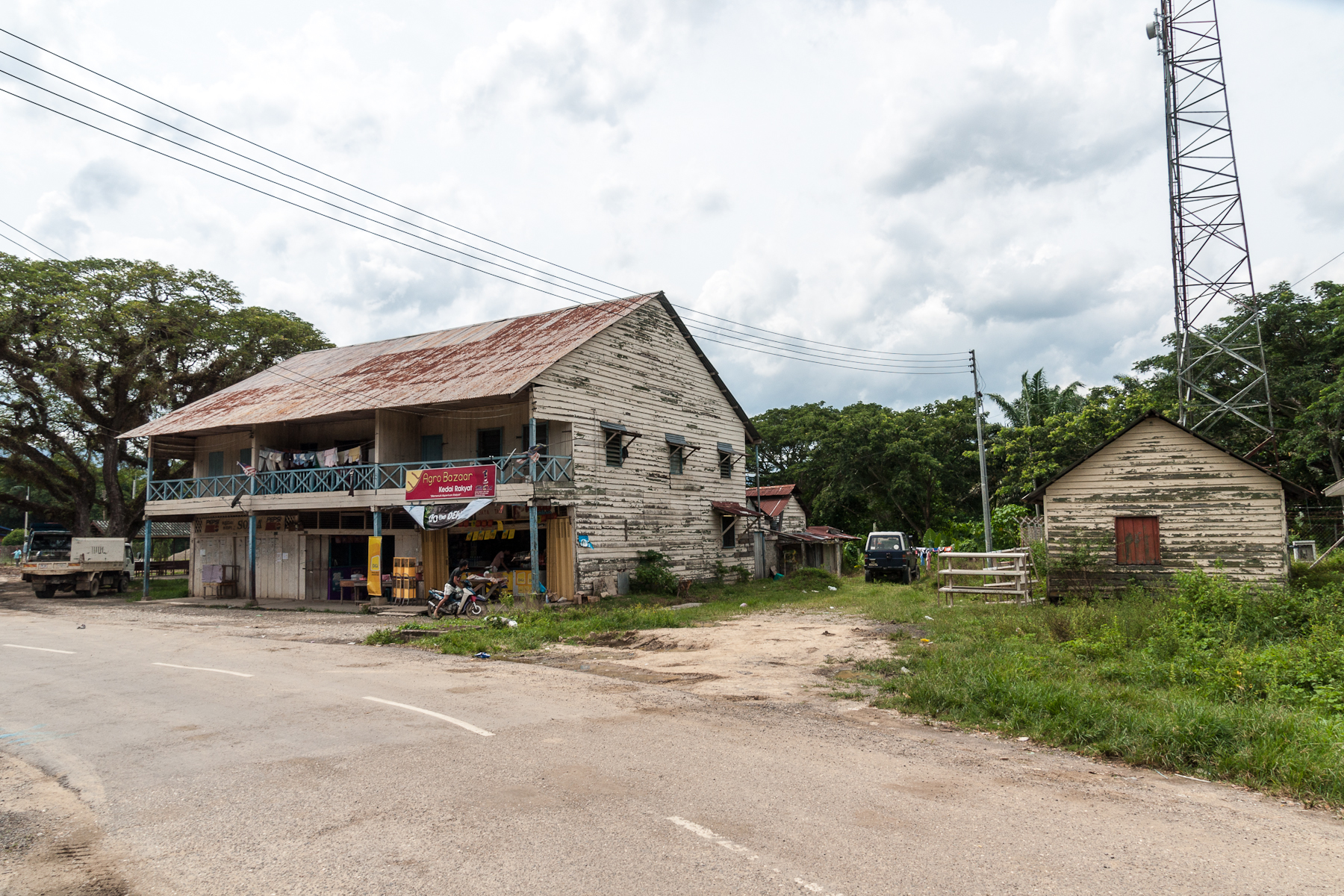
- Melalap Town, a House near the Former Railway Station of North Borneo Railway.

- Location within Borneo
- Coordinates: 5°14′31.5″N 115°59′53.9″E
- Country: Malaysia
- State: Sabah
- District: Tenom
- Division: Interior Division
- Elevation: 200 m (660 ft)
- Highest elevation: 1,282 m (4,206 ft)

Population (2020)
  - Total: 25,084

Melalap is a rural town and mukim in the Tenom District of Interior Division, Sabah, Malaysia. It is approximately 15 km (9.3 mi) north of Tenom, 27 km (17 mi) south of Keningau and 160 km (99 mi) south of the capital state, Kota Kinabalu. Melalap is a former stop for Sabah State Railway is the Melalap railway station, later abandoned.

== Infrastructure ==
Melalap has undergone upgrades, featuring a new RM42 million water treatment plant, a RM42 million road project on Federal Route 500, phased streetlight repairs, and a heritage-themed weekly market. Housing and Urban Development Board was proposed in Melalap town, along with a new township as well as an oil palm plantation that belongs to SD Guthrie (formerly Sime Darby).

== Geography ==
Melalap is flat with some undulating hilly and mountainous areas, bounded by the Crocker Range on the west. Other local, paved hilly roads are provided by the Witti Range to the east. Flat areas are mostly covered with palm trees, with some provided by an oil palm plantation. The longest nearby river is the Pegalan River, which is a tributary to Padas River.
