= Crocker Range National Park =

National park in Malaysia

- Taman Negara Banjaran Crocker
- IUCN category II (national park)
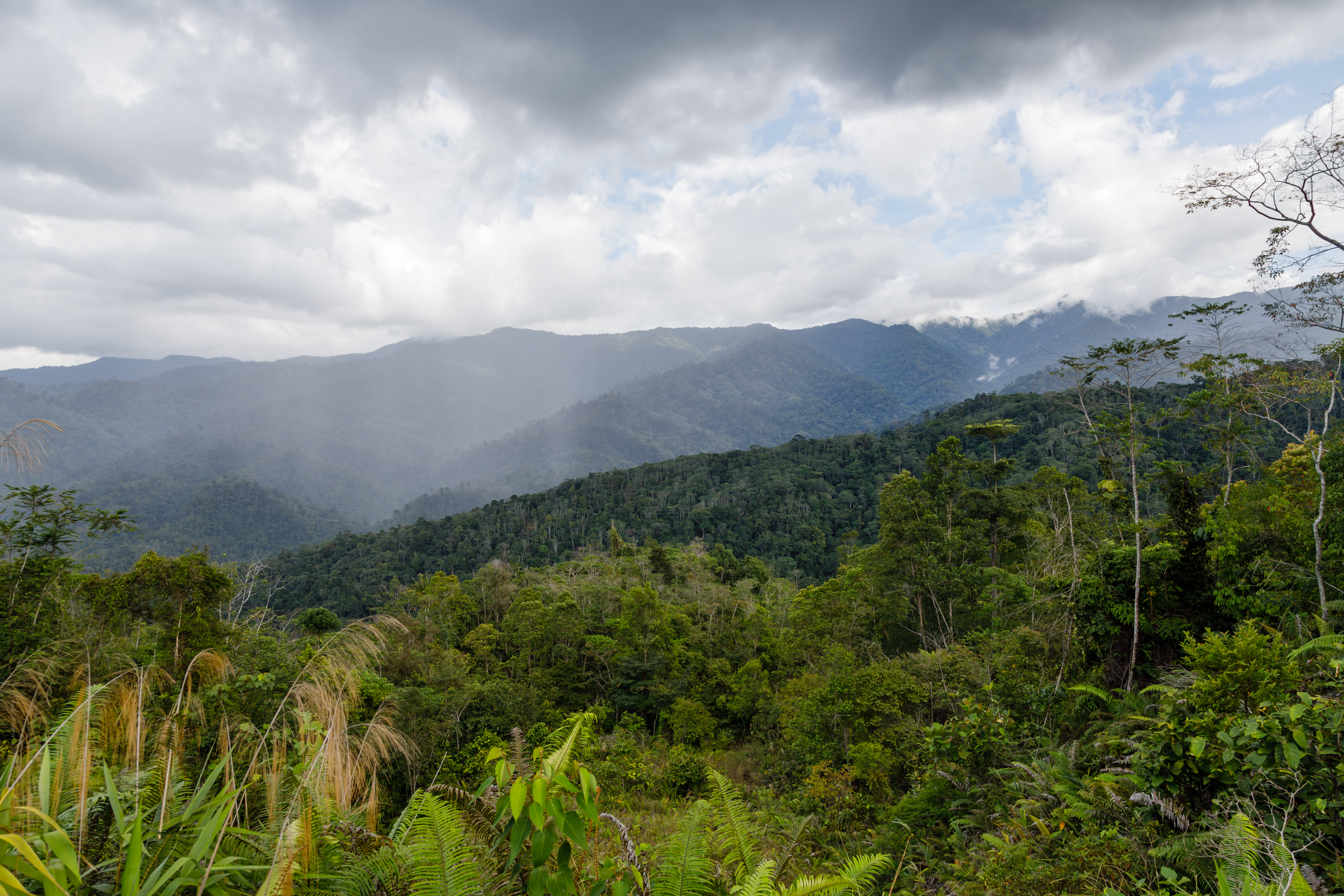
- Rain falling at the West Coast side of the Crocker Mountain Ranges

- Location within Borneo
- Location: Sabah, Malaysia
- Nearest city: Kota Kinabalu
- Coordinates: 5°32′N 116°6′E
- Area: 1,399 km^{2} (540 sq mi)
- Established: 1984
- Governing body: Sabah Parks

Crocker Range National Park (Malay: Taman Negara Banjaran Crocker) was established in 1984, although the area had previously been under protection as a forest reserve. It covers the north-south Crocker Range, of 1200-1800 metre mountains in Sabah, Malaysia. In the vicinity of park headquarters, there is a resort that provides accommodation and food services. Other visitors facilities such as an exhibition centre, insectarium, fernarium, observation tower and trekking trail can also be found.

The park covers 1,399 km², making it the largest park in Sabah. The park consists of both hill and mountain forest, with many species of flora and fauna endemic to Borneo. Maintenance of this forest cover is essential to ensuring a pure water supply for many of the towns and communities in Sabah.

The park contains at least five species of primates, such as the orang-utan, gibbons and the furry tarsier with its enormous round eyes, and extremely sociable long-tailed macaques. The Padas River bisects the range between Beaufort and Tenom.

Crocker Range Park is administered by Sabah Parks.

== See also ==
- List of national parks of Malaysia
