= Climbing lane =

Type of road

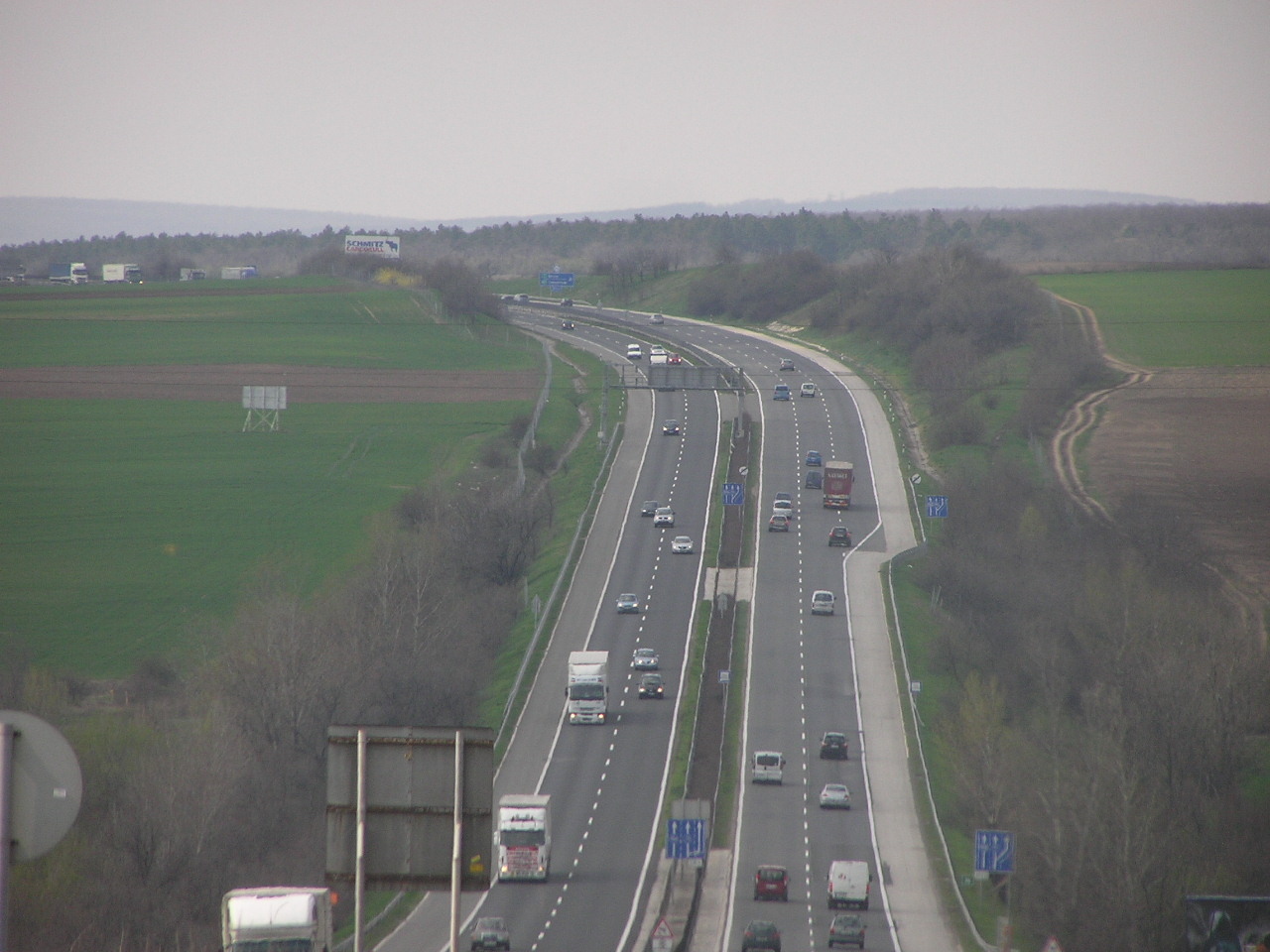
Climbing lane in Hungary; centre of image - right hand lane

A climbing lane, crawler lane (UK), or truck lane, is an additional roadway lane that allows heavy or underpowered vehicles to ascend a steep grade without slowing other traffic. They are typically used by large trucks or semi-trailer trucks, which go uphill more slowly than they travel on level ground. They are often used on major routes such as motorways and interstate highways. Traditionally, climbing lane uses three lane; two lanes for uphill and one lanes for downhill.

== Downhill lanes ==
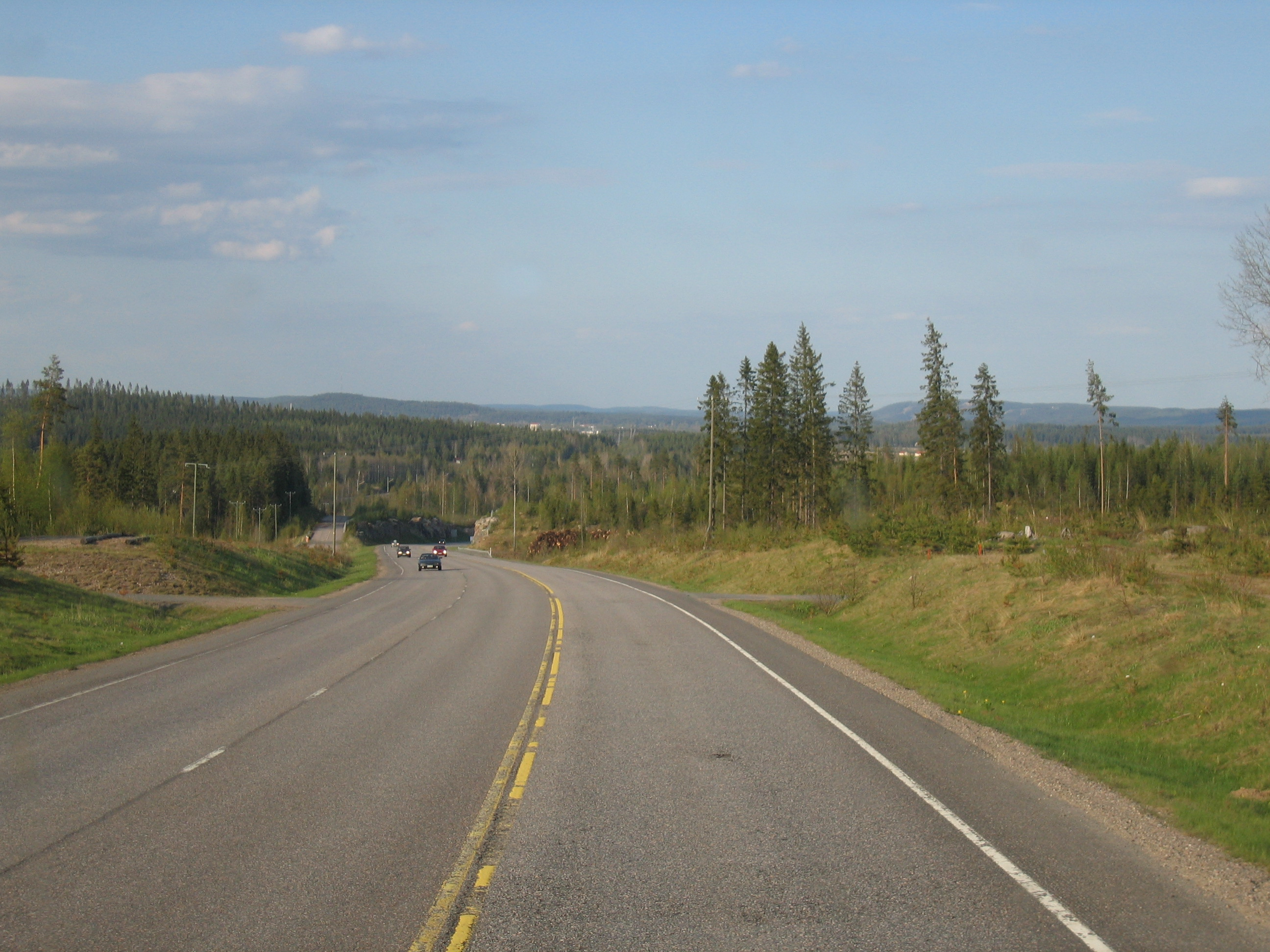
Climbing lane in Jämsä, Finland.

Some climbing lanes extend slightly over the crest of the hill, to allow slow vehicles to regain speed.

As trucks and recreational vehicles must use low gear to descend slowly, an additional lane may also be built on the downhill side. This prevents the vehicles from overusing their brakes, which may overheat and cause a runaway vehicle.

Some downhill truck lanes may also have a nearby runaway truck ramp, which can help catch and slow down runaway trucks that have brake failures to prevent a serious collision.

== See also ==
- 2+1 road
