= Tambunan =

- Town and district capital
- Pekan Tambunan; Tambunan Town

Other transcription(s)
  - Jawi: تمبونن
  - Chinese: 担布南 (Simplified) 擔布南 (Traditional); Dānbùnán (Hanyu Pinyin)
  - Tamil: தம்புனான் Tampuṉāṉ (Transliteration)
- Seal

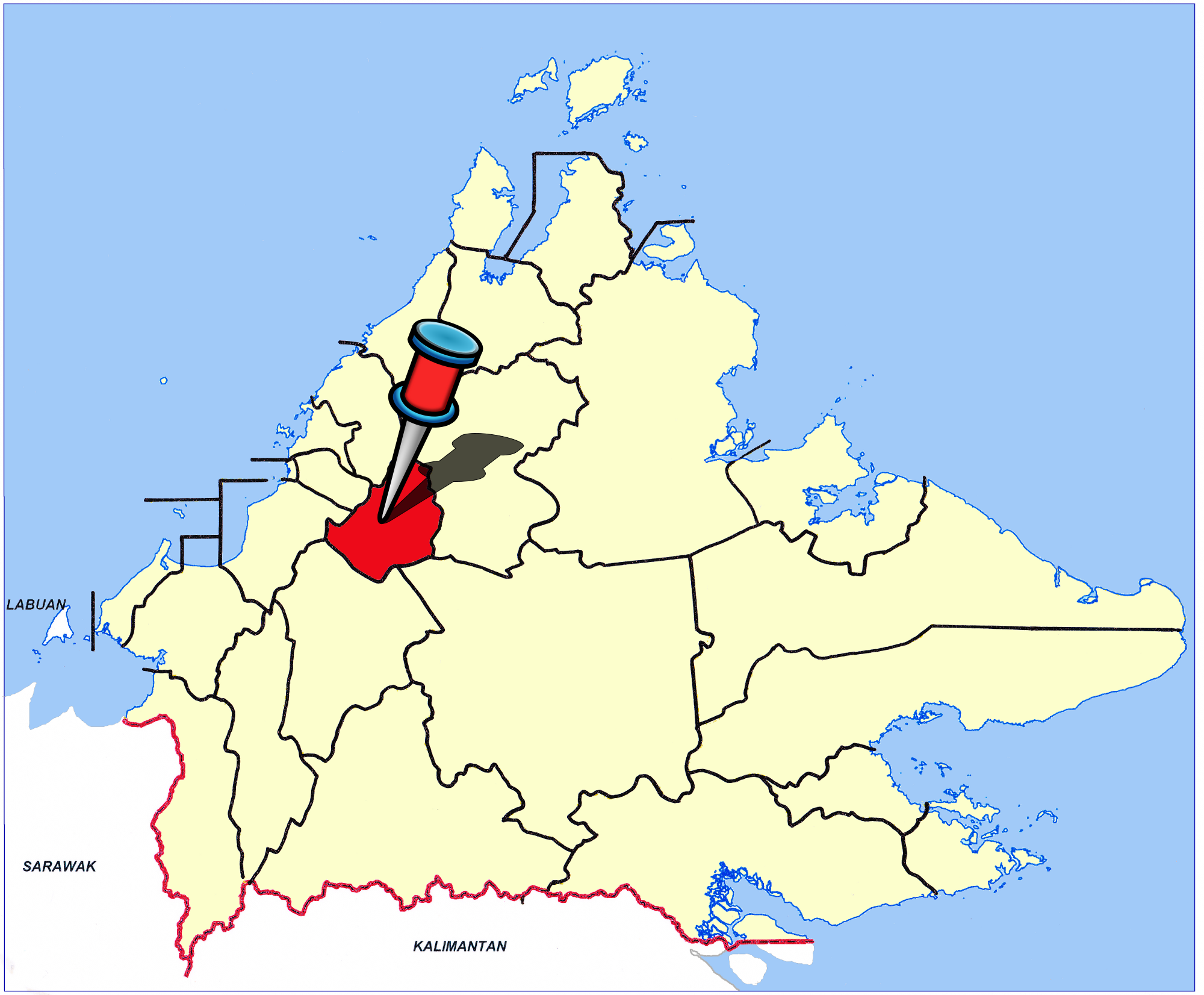
- Coordinates: 05°40′9″N 116°21′57″E
- Country: Malaysia
- State: Sabah
- Division: Interior
- District: Tambunan
- Elevation: 750 m (2,460 ft)

Population (2010)
  - Total: 35,667

Tambunan (Malay: Pekan Tambunan) is the capital of Tambunan District in the Interior Division of Sabah, Malaysia. Its population was estimated to be around 2,553 in 2010. The town is located 80 kilometres (50 miles) east of the state capital, Kota Kinabalu (to which is connected by the Malaysia Federal Route 500), 63 kilometres (39 miles) south of Ranau and 49 kilometres (30 miles) north of Keningau. At an average altitude of 750 metres (820 yards), the valley town, which is part of the Crocker Range, experiences a mild tropical climate all year long. The valley is peppered with terraced paddy fields and 70 villages. The dense forests of bamboo around Tambunan are a legacy of the British colonial period, during which an edict stated that 20 bamboo sprouts had to be planted for every bamboo cut.

== Demographics ==
According to the 2010 census, the population of Tambunan was estimated to be around 2,553 inhabitants. The town is populated mainly by the indigenous group of Kadazan-Dusun (59%), while the rest of the population are Malay, Chinese and other indigenous groups.

== Attractions ==
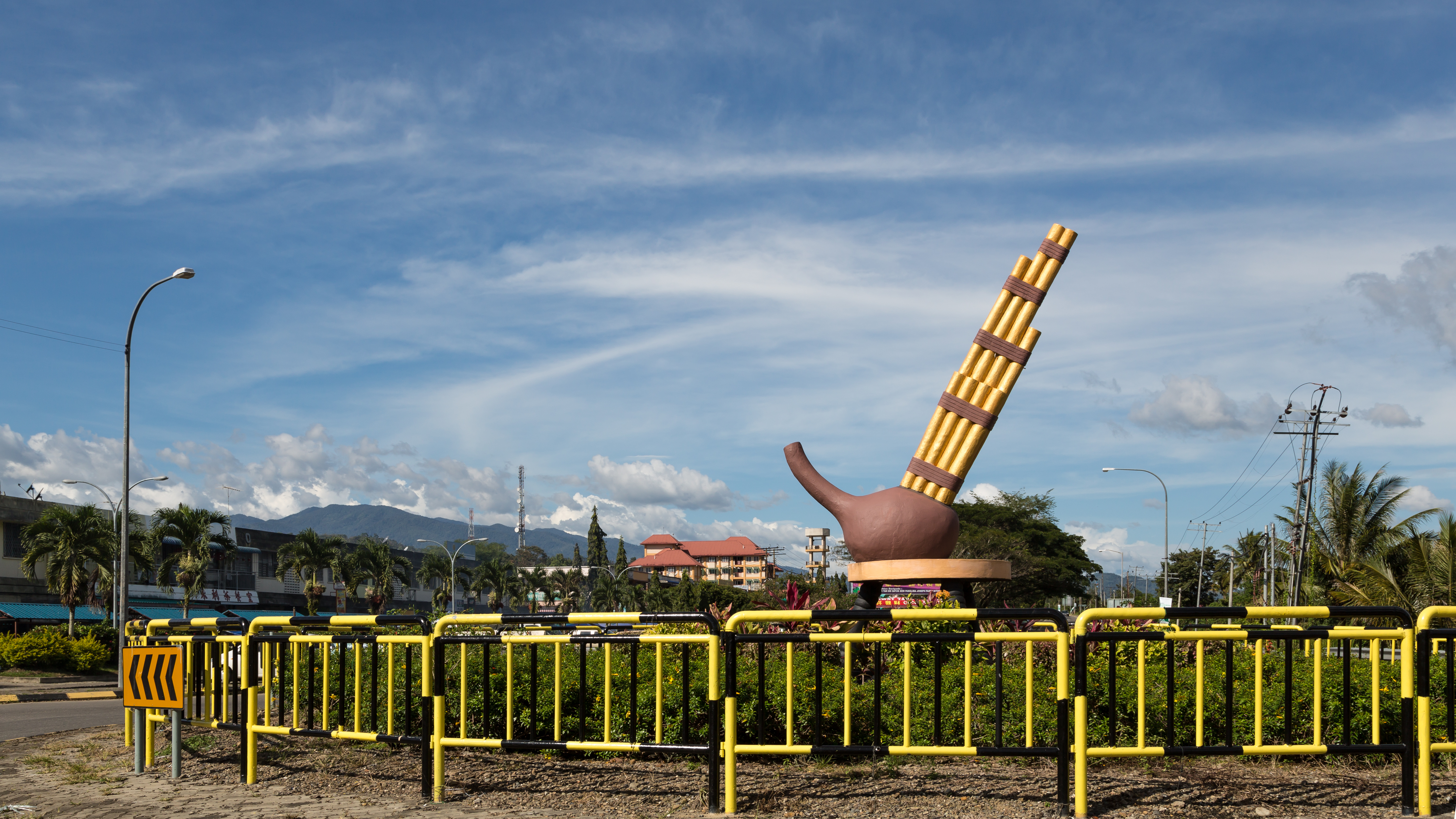
Tambunan Sabah Roundabout with Sompoton

The Mat Salleh Memorial, located in the middle of paddy fields at Kampung Tibabar (Tibabar Village), was a concrete structure erected by the Sabah state government in memory of Datu Muhammad Mat Salleh. Also known as Mat Salleh, he led a rebellion against the British North Borneo Company (NBCC) in the late 19th century, in response to the locals' dissatisfaction with alleged exploitation by the company. He was killed in a gun battle with the British police on 1 February 1900. The memorial was erected on the spot where Mat Salleh was killed, after Sabah became part of Malaysia.

Tambunan is noted for the quality of its lihing and tapai. These are rice wines traditionally made by the Kadazan and Dusun peoples of Sabah. Outside the town is the Rafflesia Forest Reserve, a forest reserve devoted to the world's largest flower, the Rafflesia. East of Tambunan is Sabah's second highest mountain, Mount Trusmadi, at 2,642 metres. Sinurambi (also called Tambunan viewing point) which set atop of Trig Hill of Trusmadi Range at 877m above sea level.

== Economy ==
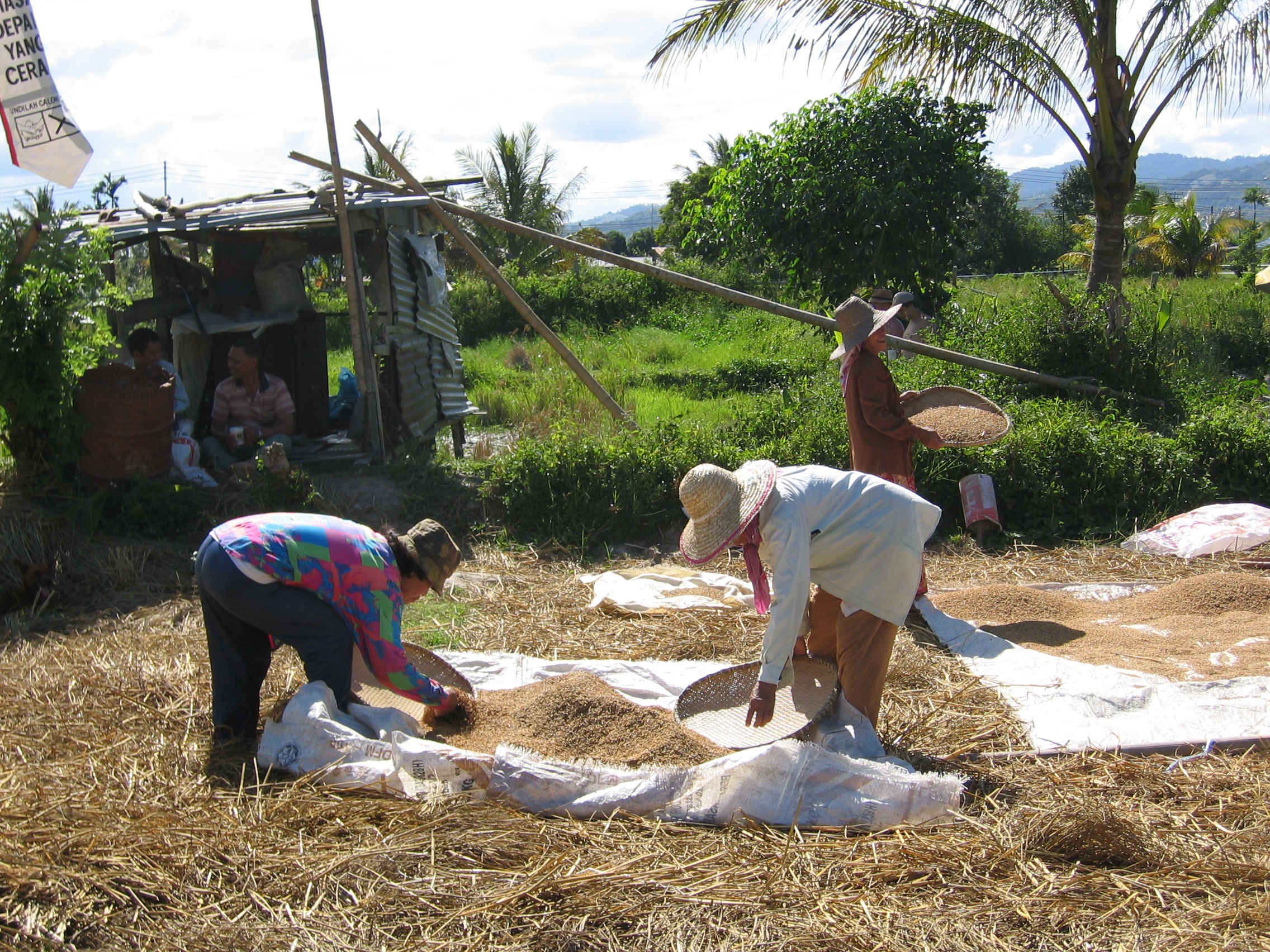
Workers in a paddy field in Kampung Tinompok (Tinompok Village).

As of 2021, there is no big industry in Tambunan. This is mainly due to the location of Tambunan which is a bit far from Kota Kinabalu, and also the town was shadowed by Keningau, which is a larger city around 40 km from Tambunan.

Tambunan hosts the only Kilang Tapai (Rice wine factory) in Sabah. Tambunan also plants large groups of ginger in the state, in which the plantation is mostly located at Kampung Tikolod, Tambunan.

== Climate ==
Climate data for Tambunan
Month	Jan	Feb	Mar	Apr	May	Jun	Jul	Aug	Sep	Oct	Nov	Dec	Year
Mean daily maximum °C (°F)	30 (86)	31 (87)	32 (89)	32 (90)	32 (90)	32 (89)	32 (89)	32 (89)	32 (89)	31 (88)	31 (87)	30 (86)	31 (88)
Mean daily minimum °C (°F)	19 (67)	18 (65)	19 (66)	19 (67)	20 (68)	19 (67)	19 (66)	19 (66)	19 (67)	19 (67)	19 (67)	20 (68)	19 (67)
Average precipitation mm (inches)	150 (5.8)	94 (3.7)	150 (5.8)	190 (7.5)	210 (8.2)	190 (7.3)	130 (5.1)	120 (4.9)	160 (6.4)	180 (7)	170 (6.8)	150 (6)	1,890 (74.4)
Source: Weatherbase
