= Keningau–Tambunan Highway =

Road in Malaysia

Keningau–Tambunan Highway

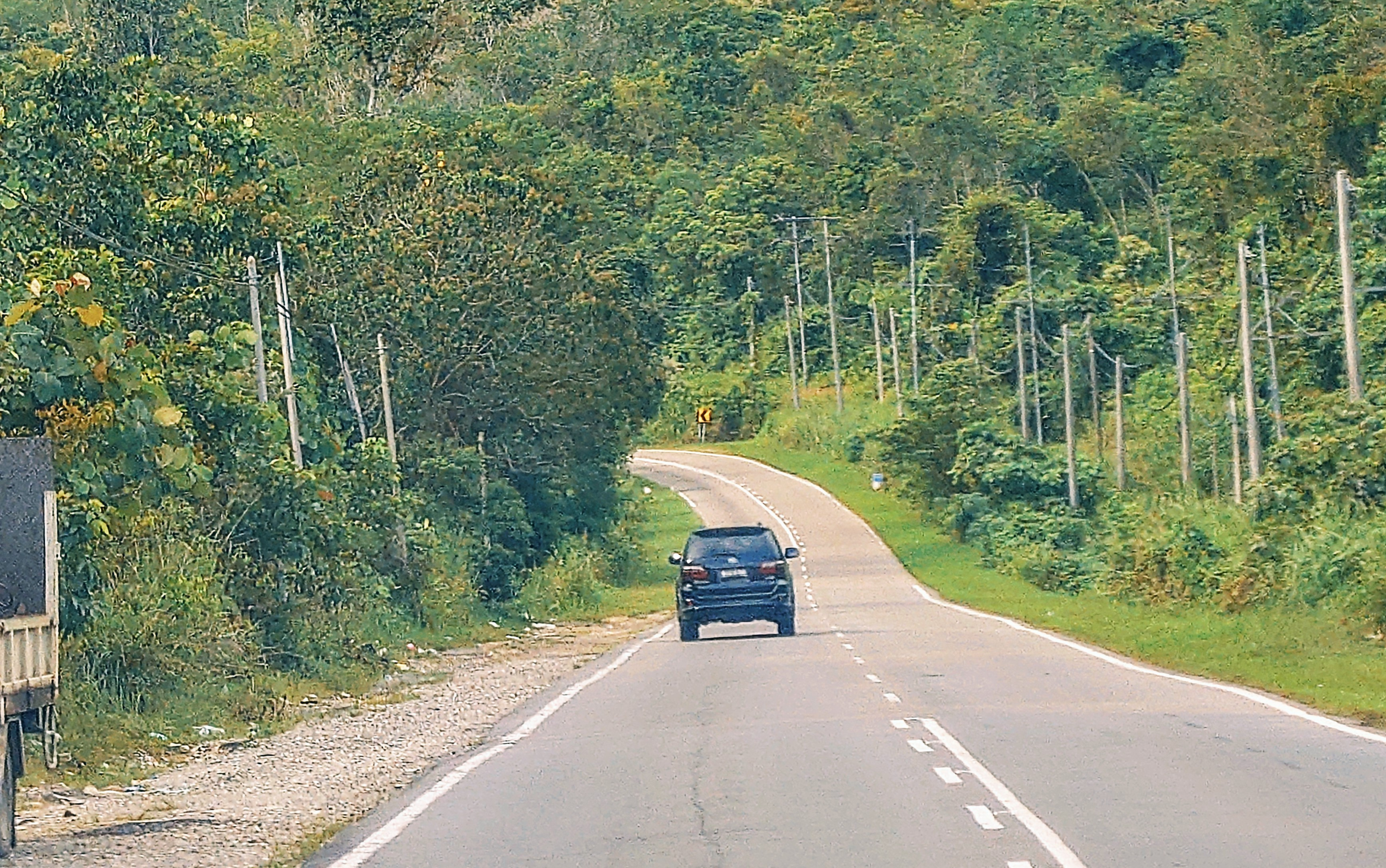
- Jalan Keningau–Tambunan in rugged area.

Route information
- Part of FT 500 (Interior North–South Highway)
- Maintained by Malaysian Public Works Department
- Length: 49 km (30 mi)

Major junctions
- Southwest end: Keningau
- FT 500 Federal Route 500/Interior North–South Highway; Kimanis–Keningau Highway; Tawau–Keningau Highway
- Northeast end: Tambunan (continues as Tambunan–Ranau Highway)

Location
- Country: Malaysia
- Primary destinations: Keningau, Tenom, Sook (continues to Tawau), Tambunan

Highway system
- Highways in Malaysia; Expressways; Federal; State

Keningau–Tambunan Highway (Malay: Jalan Keningau–Tambunan) is a major federal road link in the Malaysian state of Sabah. It is a road section, part of the Federal Route 500 and Interior North–South Highway.

== Route background ==
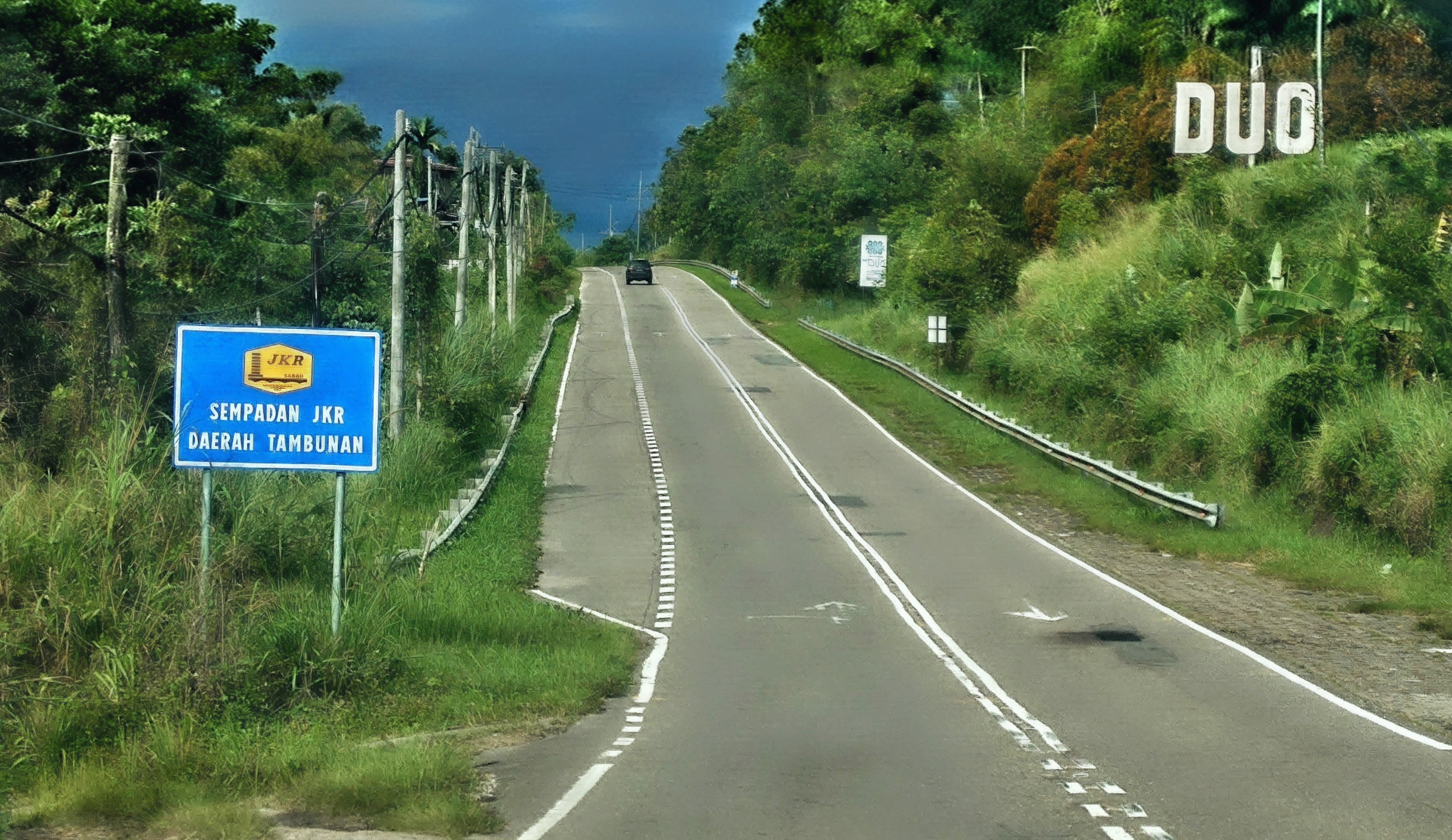
The Keningau and Tambunan border near the three lane climbing lane before the rugged area.

The road was start from the main city of Keningau as a straight line dual carriageway until the junction of Hospital Keningau which transition to a single carriageway road. Like before, the highway continues as a straight line as it passes through sparsely populated area like Bingkor until Apin-Apin. Ranging from 18 to 20 kilometres (12 mi) as a straight road, it was considered the straightest highway in both Malaysia and Sabah. After passing through the village of Apin-Apin, the road transition to a rugged, hilly road as it begins to cross a forest reserve, as well as it being mountainous as it runs valley between the Crocker Range and Trusmadi Range. Featuring a three-lane climbing lane, the start of the climb is almost 2 km (1.2 mi), with punishing road gradients from 10% to 12% which are steep enough to slow down vehicles including lorry, with the summit elevation of 764 m (2,507 ft) along the high slopes which are prone to landslides.

While the highway passes through village and towns around the Tambunan District is flat after descending from the high mountainous road, some roads are still undulating, mostly gently rolling, which is below 10% gradient.

== Junction lists ==
The entire route is located in the Interior Division of Sabah.

District	Location	km	mi	Name	Destinations	Notes
Keningau	Keningau	0.0	0.0	Keningau; Keningau town centre	FT 500 Federal Route 500 – Melalap, Tenom Kimanis–Keningau Highway – Crocker Range National Park, Kimanis, Papar, Beaufort, Kota Kinabalu Tawau–Keningau Highway – Sook, Nabawan, Sapulut, Kalabakan, Tawau	Signalised intersection; start/end of dual-carriageway
Keningau	Keningau	4.6	2.9	Keningau District Hospital	Hospital Keningau	Roundabout; end/start of dual-carriageway
Keningau	Keningau	8.1	5.0	Bingkor	Bingkor	Roundabout
Keningau	Keningau	13.0	8.1	Kg. Liau Laut		
Keningau	Keningau	18.5	11.5	Kg. Apin-Apin	Apin-Apin	Junctions
Keningau	Keningau	27.0	16.8	-- m above sea level Keningau bound, Engage lower gear		
Tambunan	Tambunan	33.0	20.5	Rompon	Jalan Rompon – Rompon	T-junction
Tambunan	Tambunan	35.0	21.7	-- m above sea level Tambunan bound, Engage lower gear		
Tambunan	Tambunan	38.5	23.9	Kg. Monsok	Jalan Monsok – Monsok, Trusmadi	T-junction
Tambunan	Tambunan	49.3	30.6	Tambunan; Tambunan town centre	Jalan Kaingaran – Kaingaran, Trusmadi, Sinurambi	Roundabout
Tambunan	Tambunan	56.7	35.2	Tambunan; Ginger Roundabout	FT 500 Federal Route 500 – Penampang, Kota Kinabalu SA2 Tambunan–Ranau Highway – Ranau, Kundasang, Sandakan	Signalised roundabout
1.000 mi = 1.609 km; 1.000 km = 0.621 mi: Concurrency terminus

== Certain incidents ==
- At 10th of November, 2021, following the night occur on 9th November, the highway was cut down by landslides, making the route impassable for all type of vehicle. Therefore, driver can either use the Kimanis–Keningau Highway or another alternative road via a local road near the main highway of Federal Route 500, Jalan Ranggom Kepayan. The road was then reopened to traffic back, when the new bridge was made.
