= Maliau Falls =

Waterfall in Malaysia

Maliau Falls is best known for its seven tiers falls. It is the largest of all the waterfalls known in the Maliau Basin Conservation Area in Tongod District, Sabah, Malaysia. Takob Akob waterfall and Giluk waterfall are located in the same area.

== See also ==
- List of waterfalls
