= Trusmadi Range =

Mountain range in Malaysia

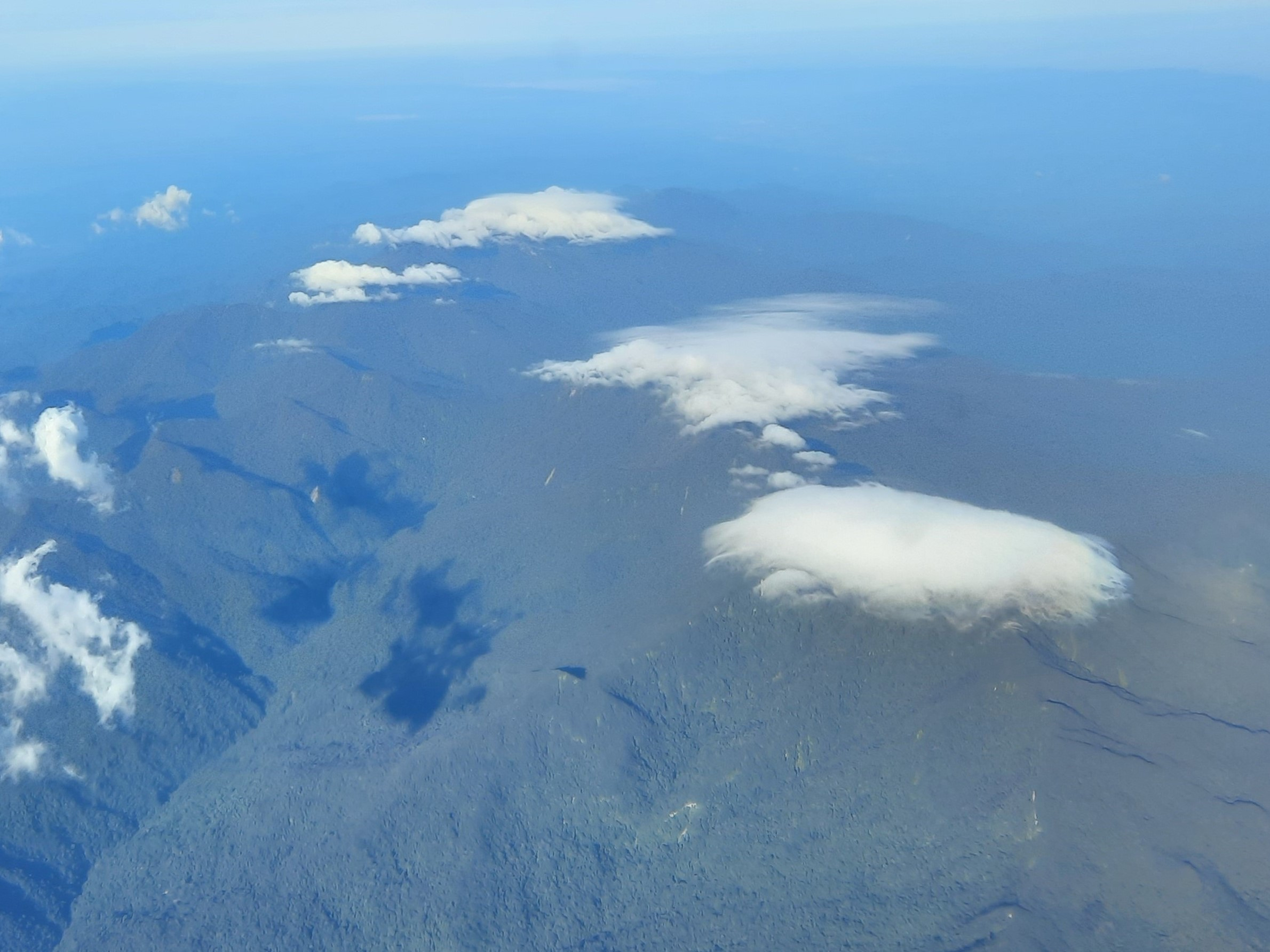
- Trusmadi Range with peaks of Trusmadi (furthest from view, enveloped by cloud), Kaingaran and Sinsing

Highest point
- Peak: Mount Trusmadi
- Elevation: 2,580 m (8,460 ft)
- Coordinates: 5°35′N 116°30′E

Naming
- Native name: Banjaran Trusmadi (Malay)

Geography
- Location within Malaysia
- Country: Malaysia
- State: Sabah
- Regions: Interior, West Coast and Sandakan Division
- Districts: Keningau, Ranau, Sook, Tambunan and Tongod

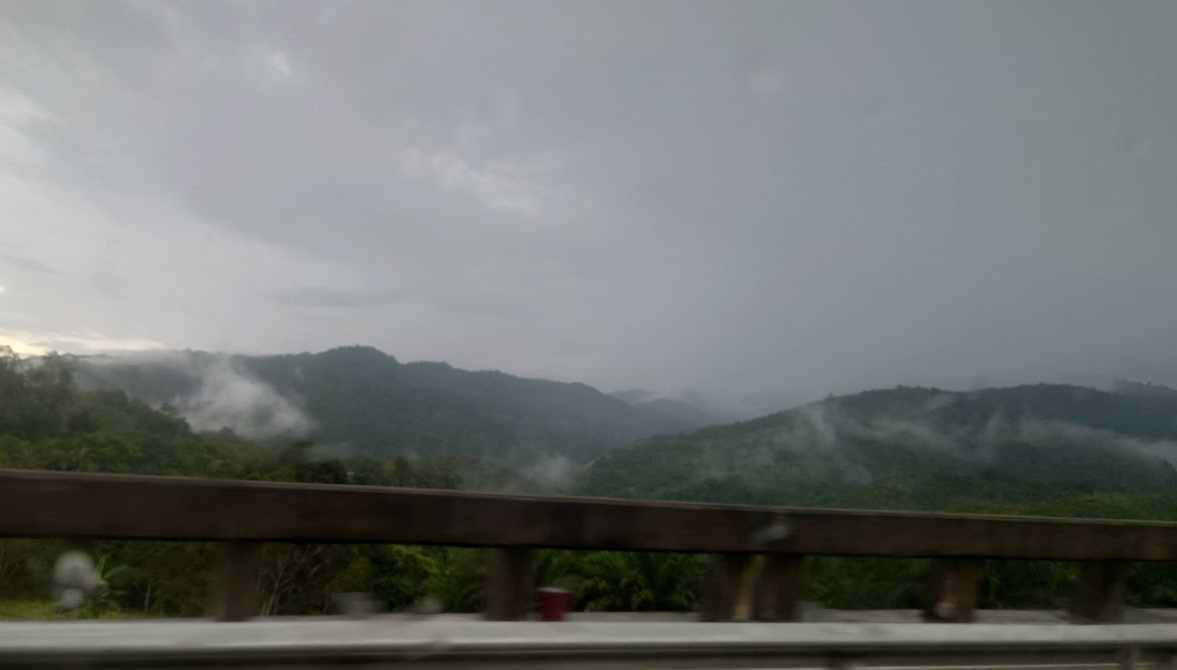
The mountain range, view from the Ranau–Tambunan Road

The Trusmadi Range or Trus Madi Range (Malay: Banjaran Trusmadi) is a mountain range in Interior Division and parts of West Coast Division of Sabah, Malaysia, that also separates the west and east coast of Sabah aside from the main Crocker Mountains. With a length of about 80 kilometres, the range includes the state's second highest peak, Mount Trusmadi, after which it is named.

== Geology ==
Its geology comprises tertiary formation of mudstone, shale and argillite with subordinate beds of quartzite, sandstone, siltstone and limestone breccias. The range physical characteristics strongly dissected into steep sided valleys and narrow-crested ridges where it is separated from the Crockers by the Tambunan-Keningau-Tenom plain. It serves as a vital water catchment area for numerous water bodies such as the Kinabatangan, Labuk, Liwagu and Pegalan rivers. The largest catchment area is the headwaters of the Pegalan River with a number of tributaries including the Ambual, Kaingaran, Keinop, Linsudon, Mailo, Monsok, Sembuan, Sungei and Sook flow to the western direction into the South China Sea while the smallest catchment is irrigated by several tributaries of Liwagu River that flow into eastern direction towards the Sulu Sea.

== Biodiversity ==
With its higher elevation, the range hosts around 172 ferns species in 75 genera and 23 families. Through a 2012 survey on the Trusmadi Forest Reserve where the range is located, a total of 36 mammal species, 144 birds' species including two species of reptiles and one species of butterfly were recorded. It is the second most important area for Bornean endemics and montane species after Kinabalu for globally threatened birds like the mountain serpent-eagle (Spilornis kinabaluensis) and the near threatened Bornean frogmouth (Batrachostomus mixtus).
