= Tongod District, Malaysia =

Tongod District Daerah Tongod
- District
- Seal

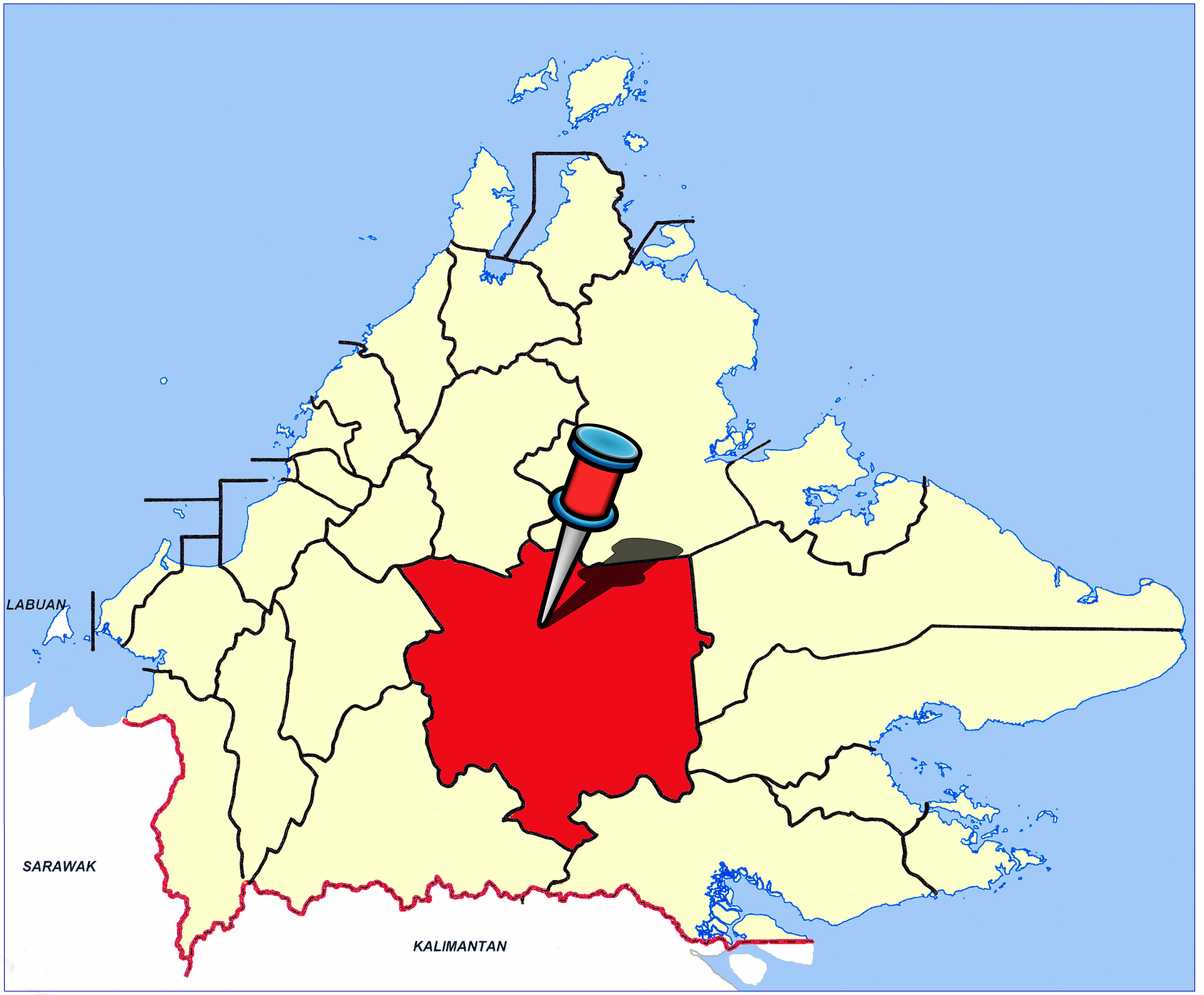
- Coordinates: 5°15′36″N 116°59′07″E
- Country: Malaysia
- State: Sabah
- Division: Sandakan
- Capital: Tongod

Government
  - District Officer: Hadzlan Jablee

Area
  - Total: 10,052 km^{2} (3,881 sq mi)

Population (2010)
  - Total: 35,341
- Website: mdtongod.sbh.gov.my pdtongod.sbh.gov.my

Map of Tongod District

The Tongod District (Malay: Daerah Tongod) is an administrative district in the Malaysian state of Sabah, part of the Sandakan Division which includes the districts of Beluran, Kinabatangan, Sandakan, Telupid and Tongod. The capital of the district is in Tongod Town. Tongod was also known as the heart of Sabah, as well as the largest district in the state.

== History ==
The district was first established in 1977 as a sub-district of the larger Kinabatangan District. The "daerah kecil" ("sub-district") was then entrusted to Keningau native, Charles Andau, who was one of the assistant district officers of the then-undivided Kinabatangan district and was formally subordinate to the district officer of Kinabatangan. On 1 March 1999, Tongod was elevated to a full district within the Sandakan Division, then two months and three weeks later on 24 May 1999, the late Datuk Matius @ Matthew Sator (1956–29 June 2021), a native of Ranau was appointed to be its first inaugural district officer. The acquisition of the status of a fully fledged district also involved the construction of a new administration building, which replaced the first secretarial building.

== Demographics ==
According to the last census in 2010, the population of the entire district is 35,341 inhabitants. In relation to the total area of 10,052 km^{2}, it is a sparsely populated district. Orang Sungai and Kadazan-Dusun are the major ethnicities found in Tongod.

== Geography ==
Tongod sits in the center of Sabah. It was a landlocked districts, with many hilly terrains. The district's watershed feeds into crucial river basins, most notably the upper reaches of the Kinabatangan River and the Kuamut River. Tongod District borders its fellow Sandakan Division neighbouring districts of Telupid and Beluran from the north, Ranau and Tambunan to the northwest, Keningau and Sook from the west, Nabawan to the southwest, Kalabakan to the southeast, and Kinabatangan as well as Lahad Datu districts to its east. Additionally, the Maliau Basin Conservation Area is located southwest near Sapulut of Nabawan District, Danum Valley Conservation Area to the east with both Lahad Datu and Kinabatangan and mountain ranges such as the Trusmadi Range which situated northwest near district like Tambunan as well as Sook, and Brassey Range which was situated the eastern side. The highest point of Tongod District is Gunung Lotung, has a summit of 1,805m (5,922 feet) above sea level, located within Maliau Basin. The Imbak Canyon Conservation Area is located in central Sabah, 49 kilometres (30 mi) away from Tongod town.

Because Tongod is the largest district in the state, it features an extensive network of historical and active logging roads linked to timber concessions. Its capital town was connected by rural state and district roads, approximately 62 kilometres (39 mi) to Telupid, and 149 kilometres (93 mi) to Sook via the Linayukan–Sinaron Road.

== Infrastructure ==
Tongod has records significant infrastructure progress. The district was planned to have a major growth, develop new millennium town spanning 1,000 acres, alongside new township. A mukim, which is located within this district, namely Penangah (or Pinangah), was also planned to make a new town. Road infrastructure include the main highway from Telupid (which was later constructed by Pan Borneo Highway), Linayukan–Sinaron Road and the new 26 kilometres (16 mi) paved road from Kampung Matiku (Sapulut, Nabawan District) to Kampung Kawayoi.

=== Linayukan–Sinaron Highway ===
Linayukan–Sinaron Highway is a 40 kilometres (25 mi) two-lane highway. Part of the districts road infrastructure, it is used to connect the Telupid and Tongod area to Sook and Keningau, as well as shortened the distance time from Sandakan. Although it is short, the highway is very rugged, mountainous and highly steep, as it crosses the Trusmadi Range. This road infrastructure is shared by Sook and Keningau District.

== Gallery ==
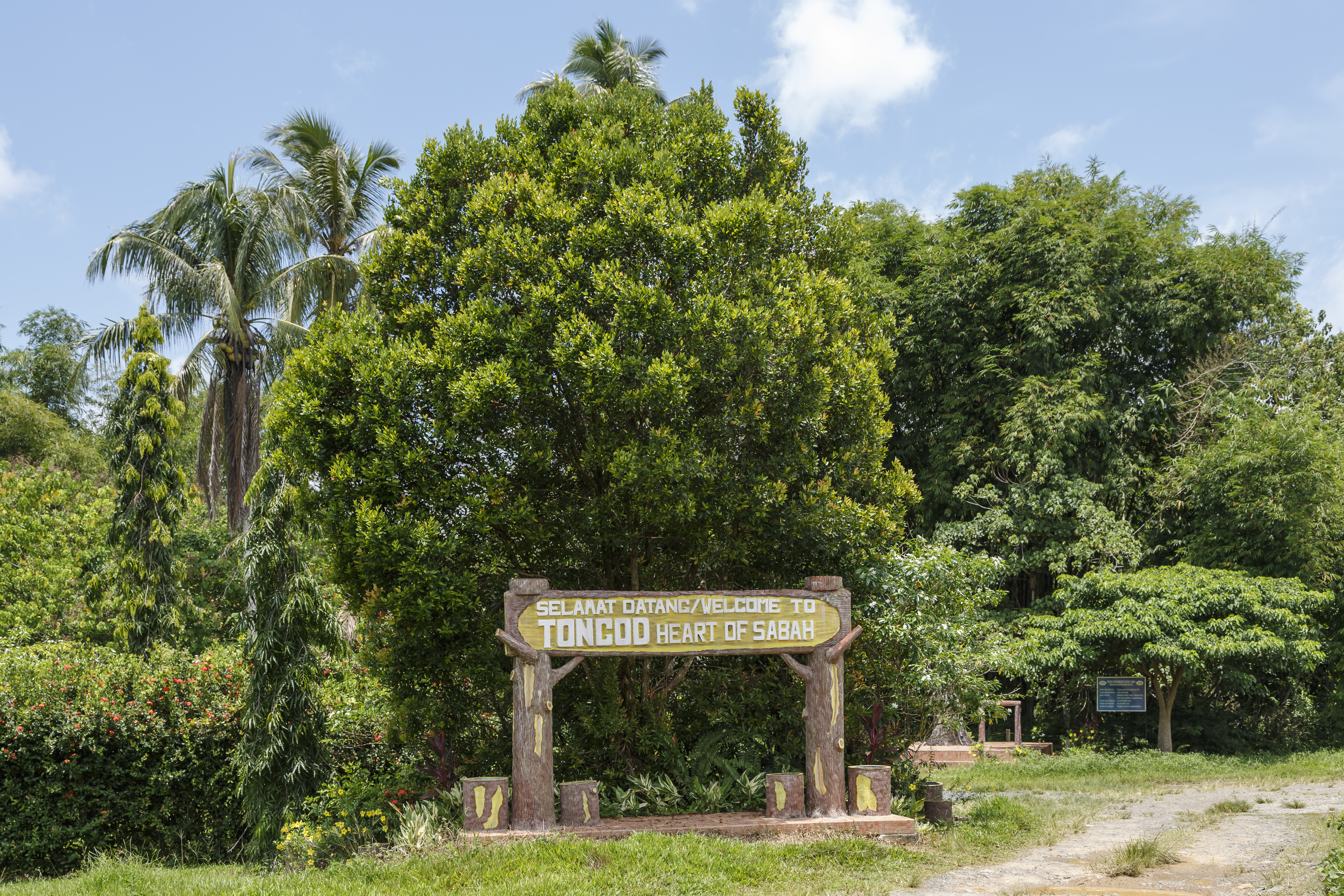
Heart of Sabah Plate.

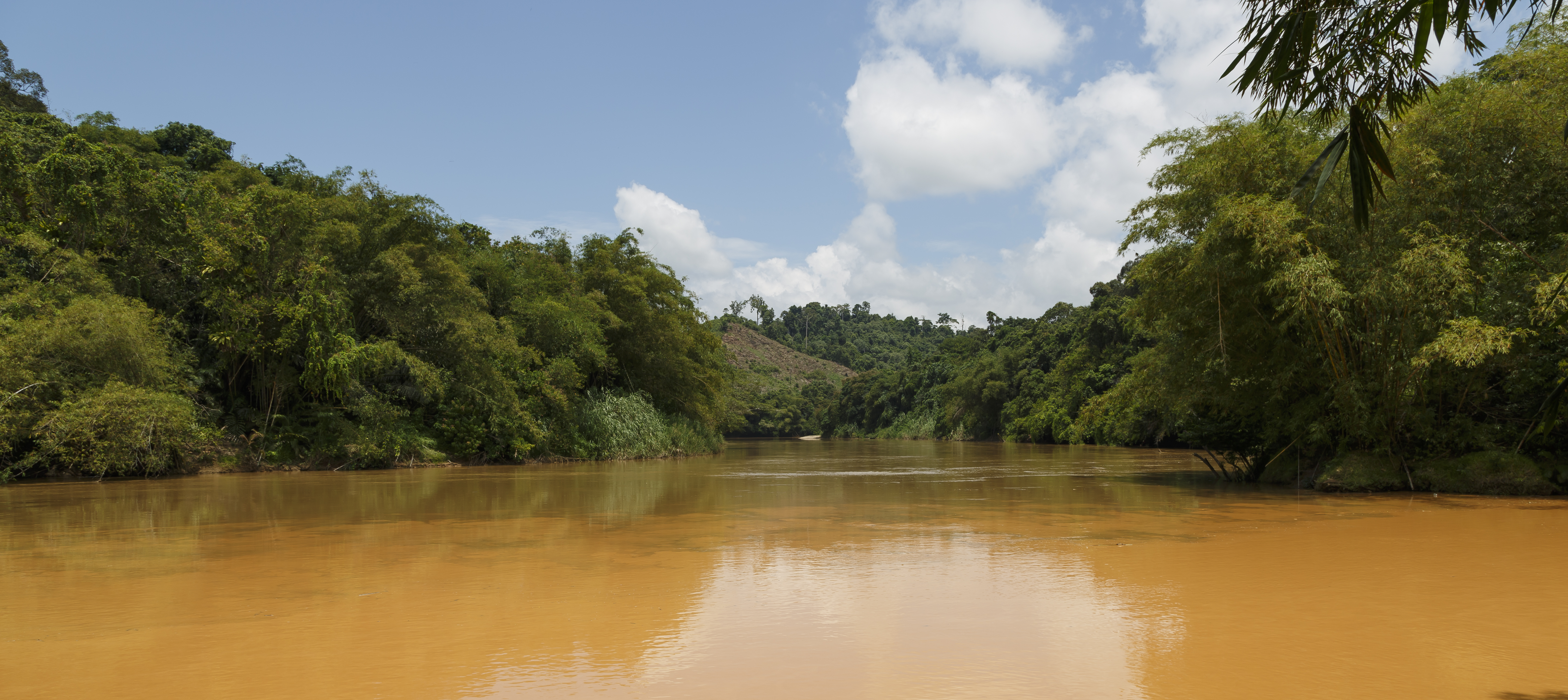
Milian River.

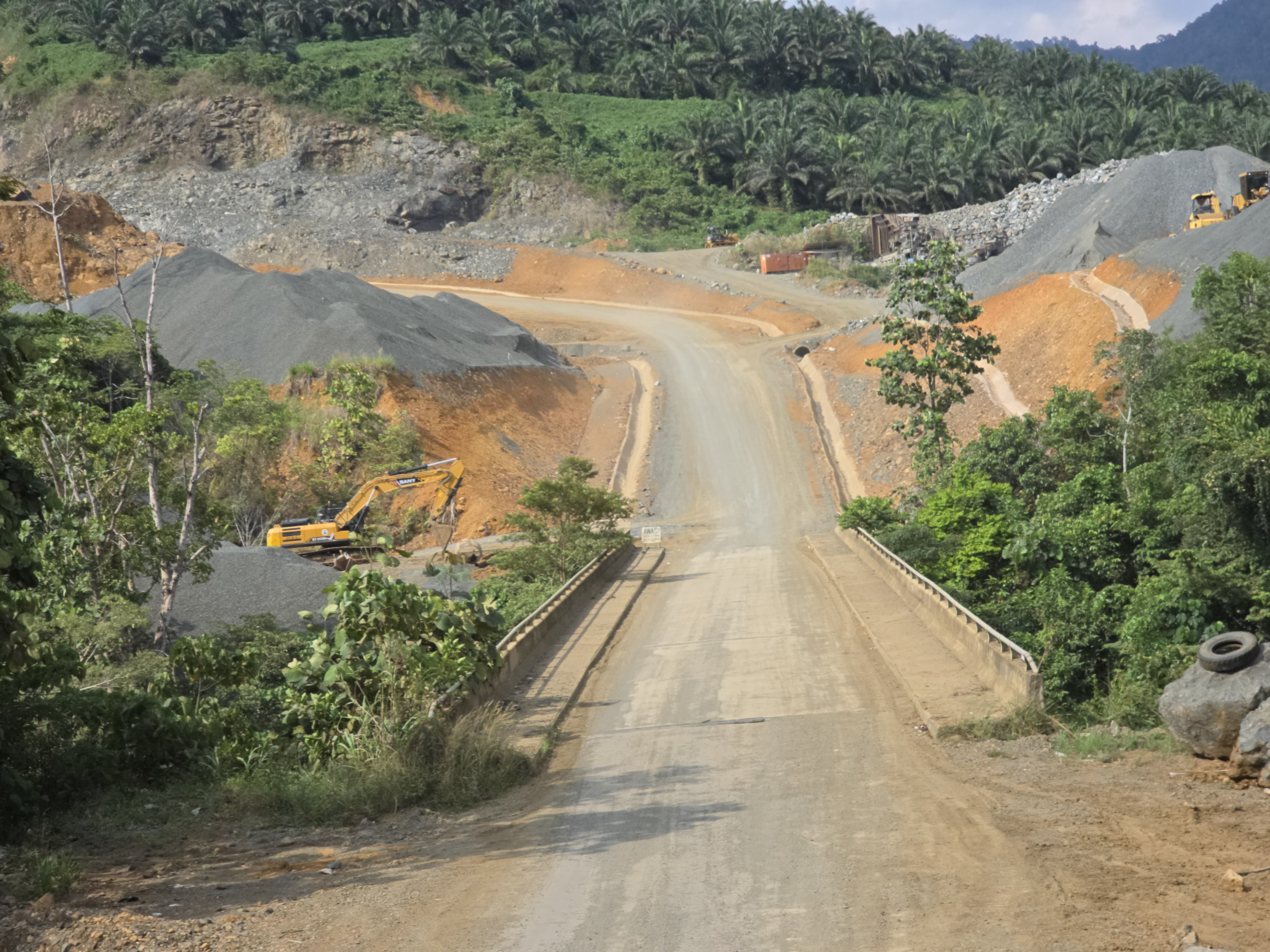
Linayukan-Sinaron Highway.

== See also ==
- Districts of Malaysia
