= Takob Akob Falls =

- Location: Maliau Basin Conservation Area, Sabah, Malaysia
- Coordinates: 4°46′14″N 116°55′02″E

Takob Akob waterfall is one of the few newly discovered waterfalls in Maliau Basin Conservation Area, in Sabah, Malaysia. Takob Akob Falls was named after the mangosteen look-alike tree found beside the falls.

The drop of Takob Akob Falls is 38 metres (125 ft), making it the highest waterfall of Maliau Basin, Sabah Malaysia.

It is about 3.5 kilometers away from Nepenthes Camp (Camel Trophy Camp), about an hour trekking.

== See also ==
- List of waterfalls
