= Sook District =

Sook District Daerah Sook
- District
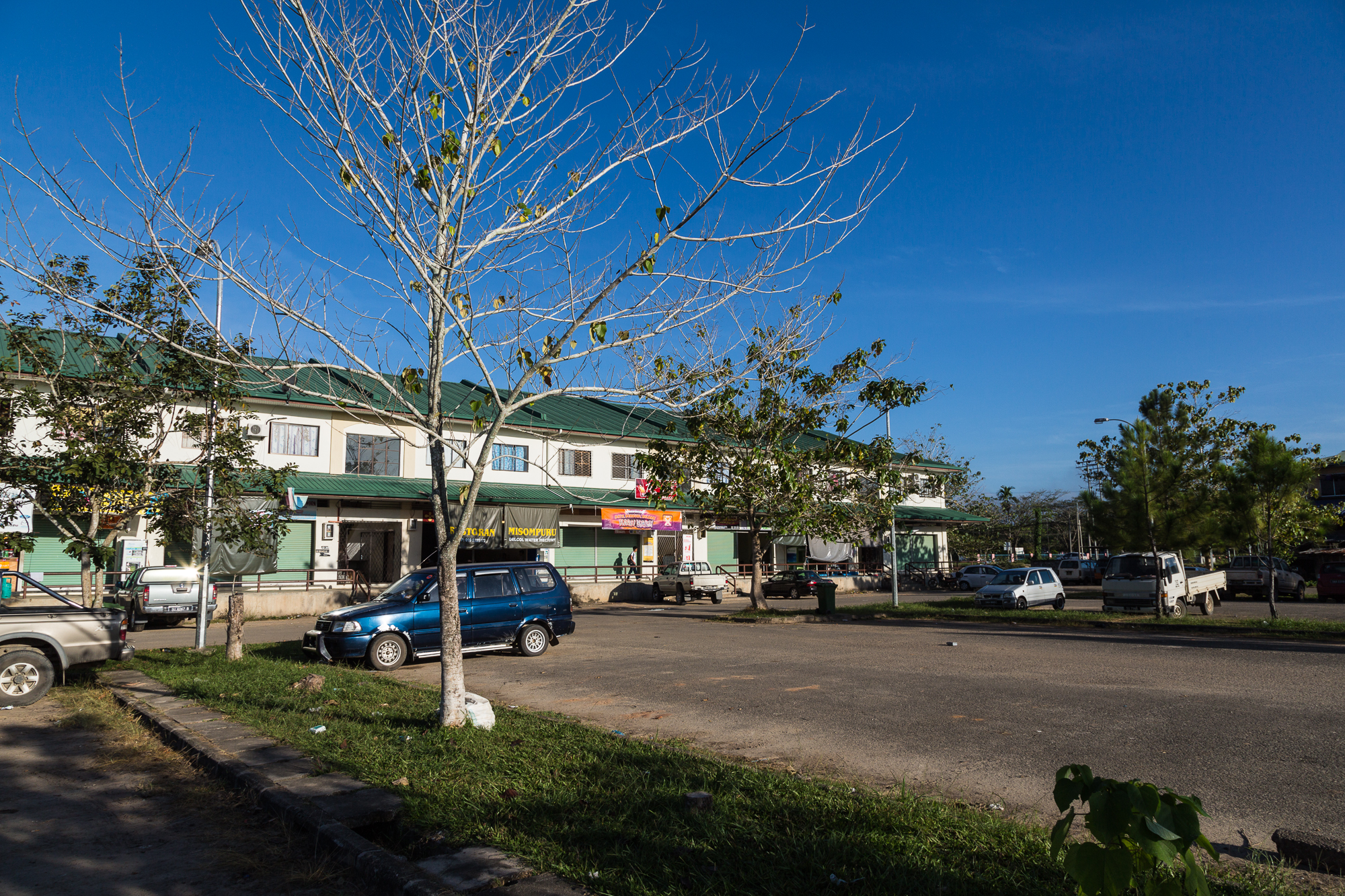
- Sook town

- Location within Borneo
- Coordinates: 5°08′N 116°19′E
- Country: Malaysia
- State: Sabah
- Division: Interior Division
- Upgraded to District: 7 August 2024
- Capital: Sook

Area
  - Total: 2,037.54 km^{2} (786.70 sq mi)

Population (2021)
  - Total: 62,171

The Sook District (Malay: Daerah Sook) is an administrative district in the Malaysian state of Sabah, part of the Interior Division. The capital of the district is the town of Sook. It serves as a timber and agricultural hub as well as a strategic transit point for motorists travelling from Keningau to Tawau via Tawau–Keningau Highway.

== History and administration ==
Sook functioned as a sub-district (daerah kecil) under the Keningau District for over 30 years. It spans a total area of 2,037.54 square kilometres, which accounted for roughly 58% of the total land area of the Keningau District before its separation. The district encompasses two state legislative assembly constituencies (DUN): N.44 Tulid and N.45 Sook.

In Sabah, the standard requirement for a sub-district to be upgraded to a full district is to possess a minimum population of 30,000 residents. With an estimated population exceeding 60,000, Sook well surpassed this criterion. Acknowledging its steady economic growth, infrastructure development, and population size, the Yang di-Pertua Negeri officially upgraded Sook from a sub-district to a full district on 7 August 2024, a decision formally gazetted in December 2024. The proposal for this upgrade was first submitted to the state cabinet on 24 January 2024, where it received in-principle approval. Currently, there are 22 government departments and agencies operating within Sook to facilitate administrative services for the local populace. A proposal has also been put forward to construct a new open-concept hall for community events and a comprehensive district administrative office.

== Demographics ==
Based on recent studies, Sook has an estimated population of 62,171 people, distributed across its two state constituencies (30,721 residents in Tulid and 31,450 residents in Sook).

The population of the district is predominantly made up of indigenous groups. The ethnic breakdown consists mainly of the Dusun at 76% (approx. 47,250 people), followed by the Murut at 16% (approx. 9,947 people), and the Kadazan at 5% (approx. 3,108 people). Other ethnicities make up the remaining 3% of the population. Administratively, the population is spread across several mukims (communes), namely Sook, Tulid, Lanas, Dalit, Ansip and Seberang.

== Geography ==
Sook is located within the Interior Division and completely bounded by other landlocked district in Sabah, being Keningau to the northwest, Tambunan to the north, Nabawan to the southeast and Tongod to the east, making it the double landlocked district in the Malaysian state of Sabah. Although certain places in the district is flat and gently undulating, Sook also consist of rolling undulating, rugged mountainous terrain, maintained and bounded by certain mountain range such as Trusmadi Range to the north, and Witti Range to the southwest, with some is also a forest reserve, being the Sook Lake Forest Reserve. The district also have a river named after its name, the Sook River.

== Economy ==
The economy of Sook is heavily driven by the agricultural sector. Under the Sabah Maju Jaya (SMJ) Development Plan, Sook has been identified as an agricultural "hot spot". A total of 69,609.13 hectares of land has been developed for agriculture, with major focus crops including oil palm, rice, taro (keladi), coffee, pineapples, rubber, cocoa and various other fruits. The livestock subsector is also given special attention and acts as a significant contributor to the local economy.

The continuous development in agriculture, livestock, fisheries, tourism, and commercial real estate is projected to bring an estimated revenue of up to RM719.8 million annually to the district.

== Infrastructure ==
Sook acts as an important strategic transit hub along the Kalabakan–Keningau route, supported by a 519.17-kilometre road network that covers almost the entire district. To further support its socioeconomic activities, major infrastructure projects have been implemented under the 12th Malaysia Plan (RMK-12), including the upgrading of the 40-kilometre Sinaron–Linayukan road that directly connects Sook to Tongod, which crosses the Trusmadi Range. Sook is also equipped with basic amenities including an excess water supply capacity of 5.06 million litres per day (MLD), electricity substations, health clinics, and educational facilities.

== Gallery ==
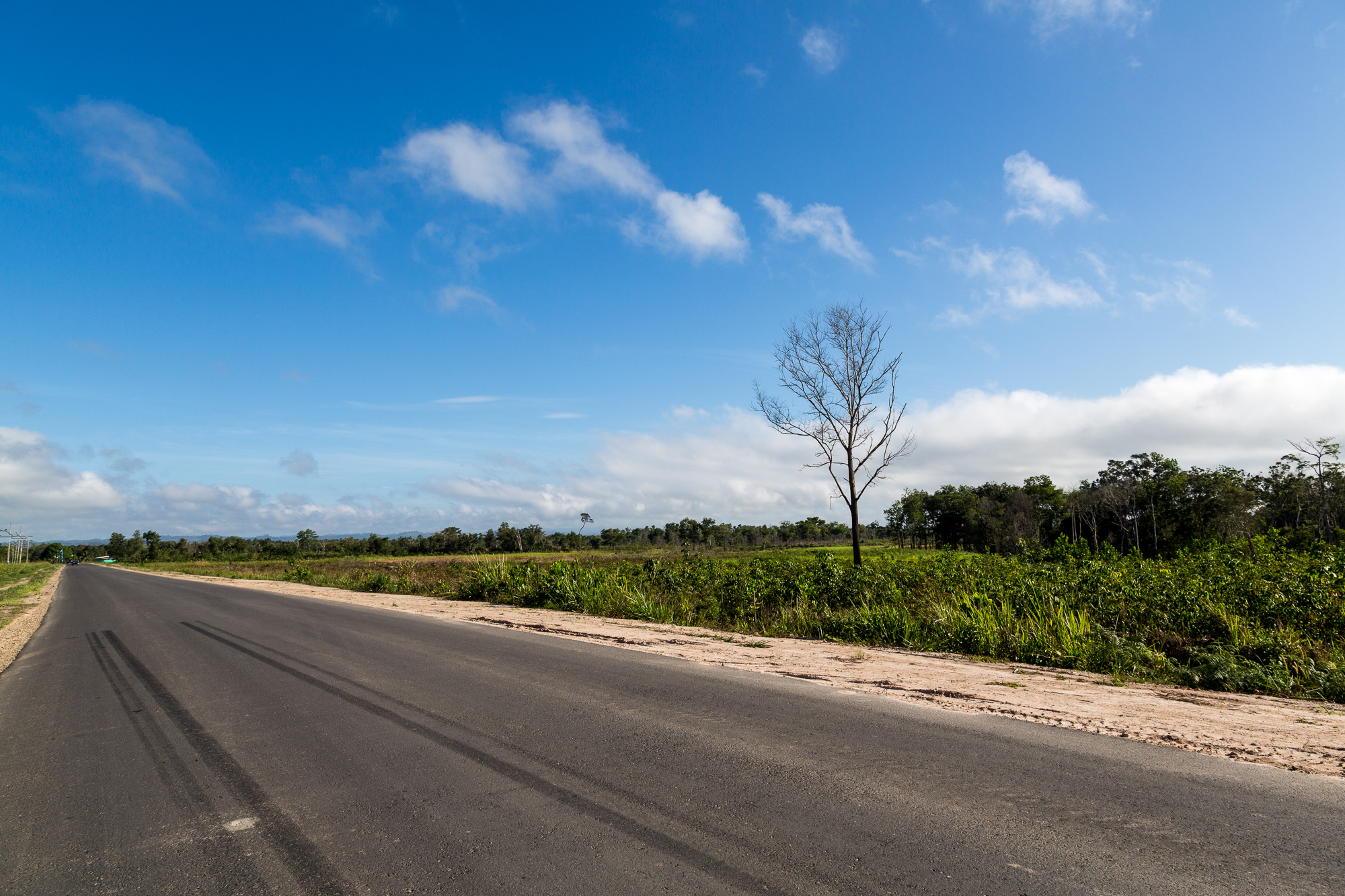
New road in Sook

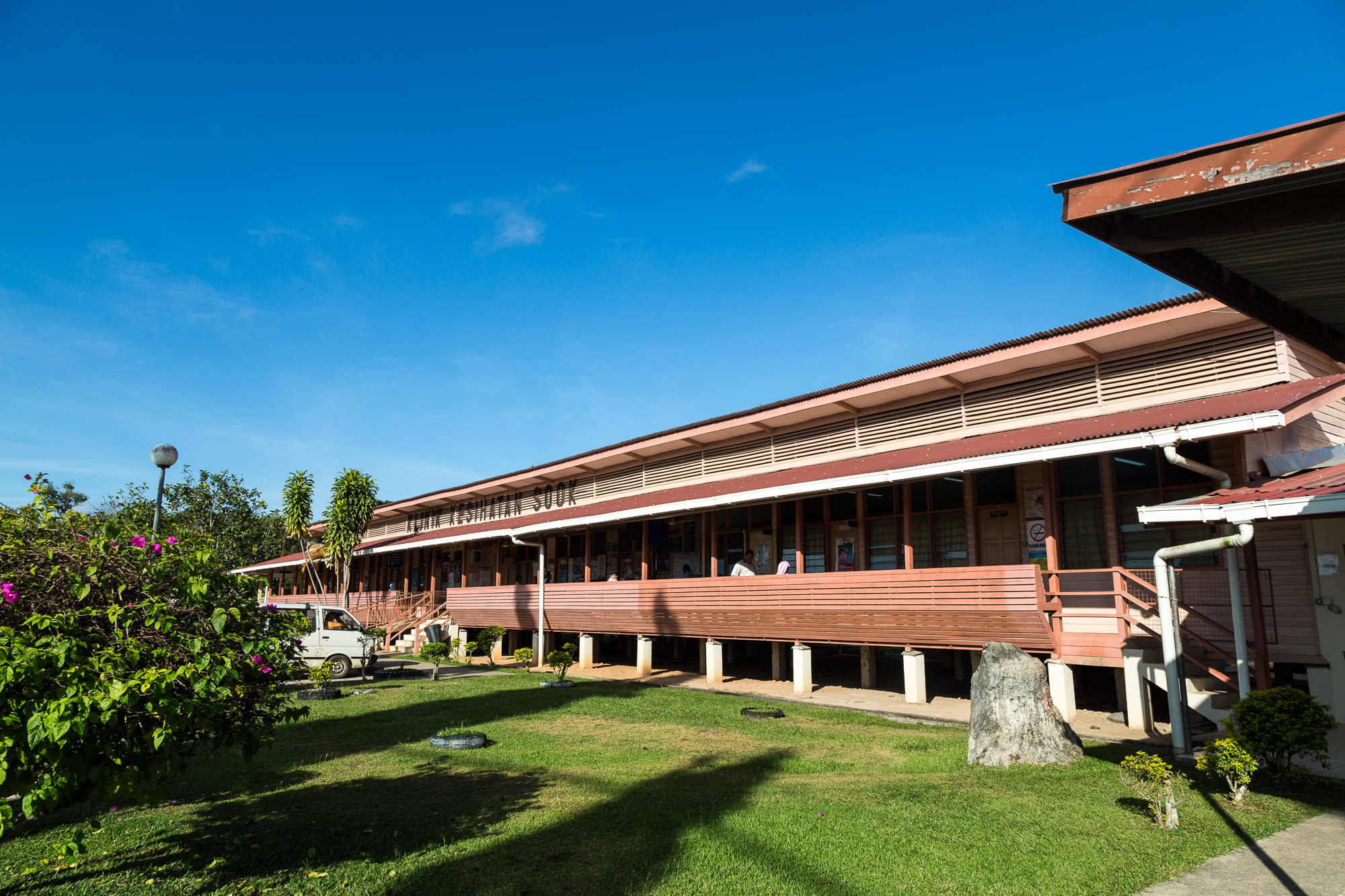
Sook Health Clinic

== See also ==
- Districts of Malaysia
