= Telupid District =

Telupid District Daerah Telupid
- District
- Seal

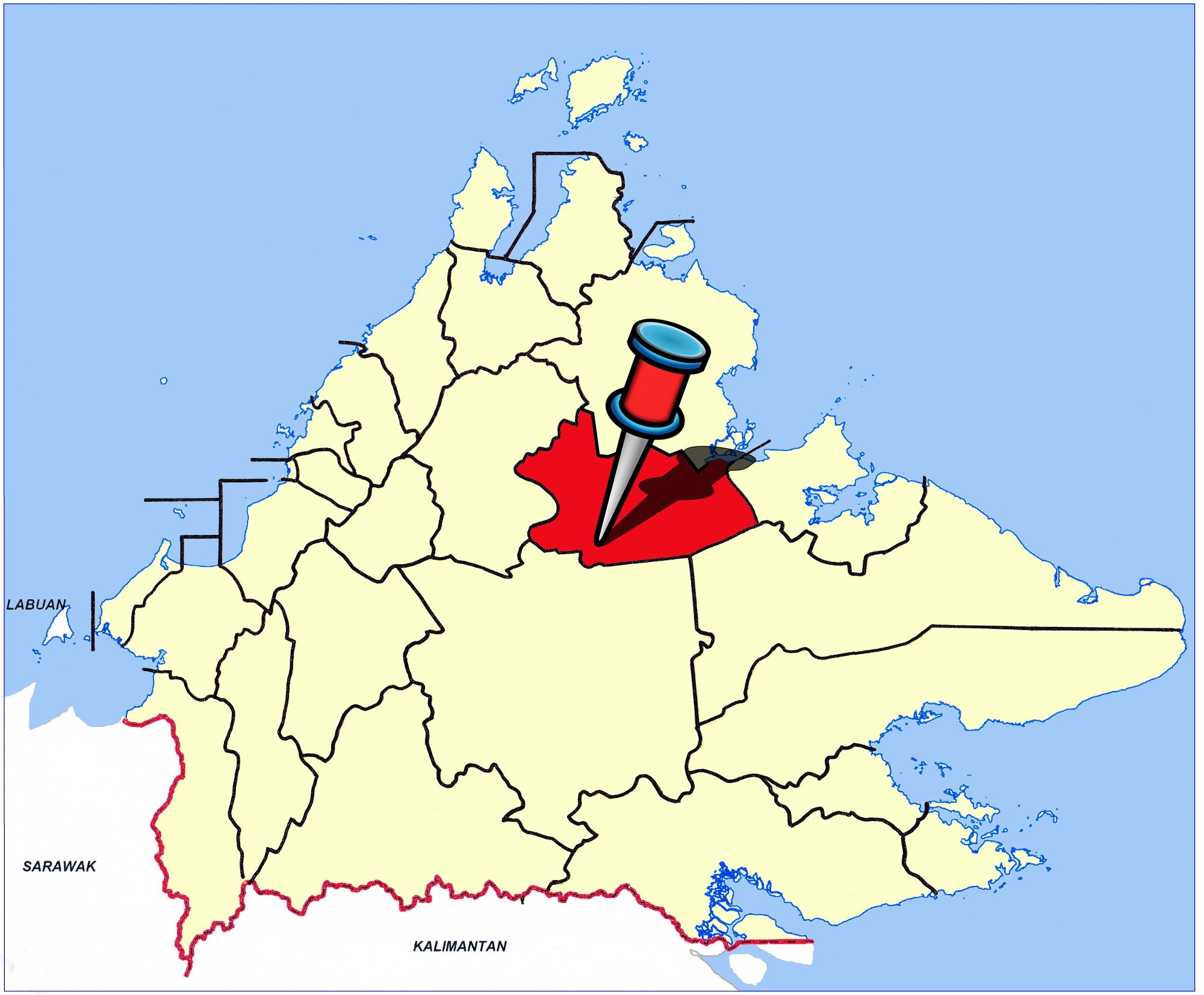
- Coordinates: 5°39′0″N 117°07′0″E
- Country: Malaysia
- State: Sabah
- Division: Sandakan
- Capital: Telupid

Government
  - District Officer: Celestine Jetony @ Jetoony

Area
  - Total: 1,935 km^{2} (747 sq mi)
- Website: mdtelupid.sbh.gov.my pdtelupid.sbh.gov.my

Map of Telupid District

The Telupid District (Malay: Daerah Telupid) is an administrative district in the Malaysian state of Sabah, part of the Sandakan Division which includes the districts of Beluran, Kinabatangan, Sandakan and Tongod. The capital of the district is in Telupid Town. The district is formerly a part of Beluran District.

== History ==
Telupid was firstly settled around 1940s and became the major route for the Sandakan Death Marches during World War II. At the time, it was mainly inhabited by the Dusun people. The present district was formed around 1965, shortly after Sabah became part of Malaysia. The district was developed following the agreement between the Australian and Malaysian government to jointly build road. Following the availability of road, a number of infrastructures start to be built there. Under the administration of United Sabah National Organisation (USNO) in 1970, Telupid was made a sub-district. In 2015, Telupid was elevated into a full district with a district council established.

== See also ==
- Districts of Malaysia
