= Maliau Basin =

Maliau Basin Conservation Area
- IUCN category Ia (strict nature reserve)
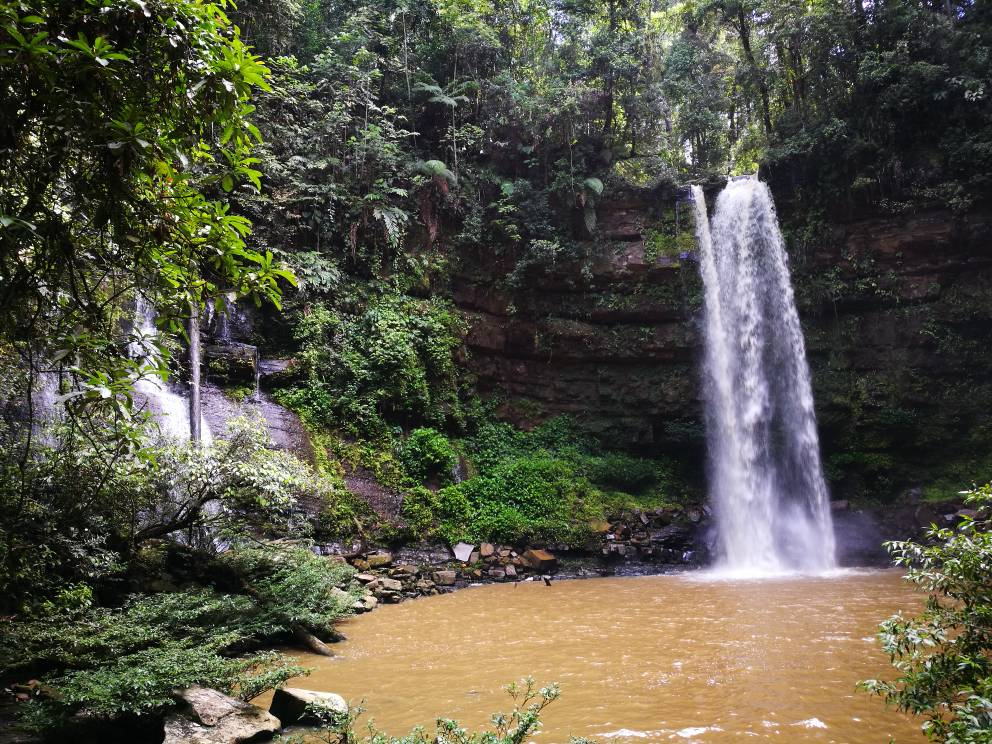
- Maliau Basin Waterfall.

- Location within Borneo
- Location: Tongod District, Sabah, Malaysia
- Nearest city: Sandakan
- Coordinates: 4°49′49″N 116°54′01″E
- Area: 588 km^{2} (227 sq mi)
- Established: 1981
- Governing body: Yayasan Sabah Group

Maliau Basin (Malay: Lembangan Maliau) or also Maliau Basin Conservation Area, is a region in Tongod District of Sabah, Malaysia, which represents a geological catchment surrounding the Maliau River. Located around the centre of Sabah in the Sandakan Division, it was designated as a conservation area by the Sabah Foundation (Yayasan Sabah) in 1981. Later in 1997 the Sabah State Assembly gazetted the Basin as a Protection Forest Reserve (Class I) with a total area of 588 square kilometres. The region also features Mount Lotung (1667 metres), Maliau Falls, and Lake Linumunsut. Efforts are underway to nominate the area as a World Heritage Site. In 2011, the Maliau Basin Studies Centre opened, a large field centre to serve as a basis for studies and teaching carried out in Maliau by naturalists, biologists, and groups of field course students (e.g., Sheffield University, Griffith University, Otago University, and the citizen-science organisation Taxon Expeditions).
