= Telupid =

Telupid Pekan Telupid
- Town and district capital
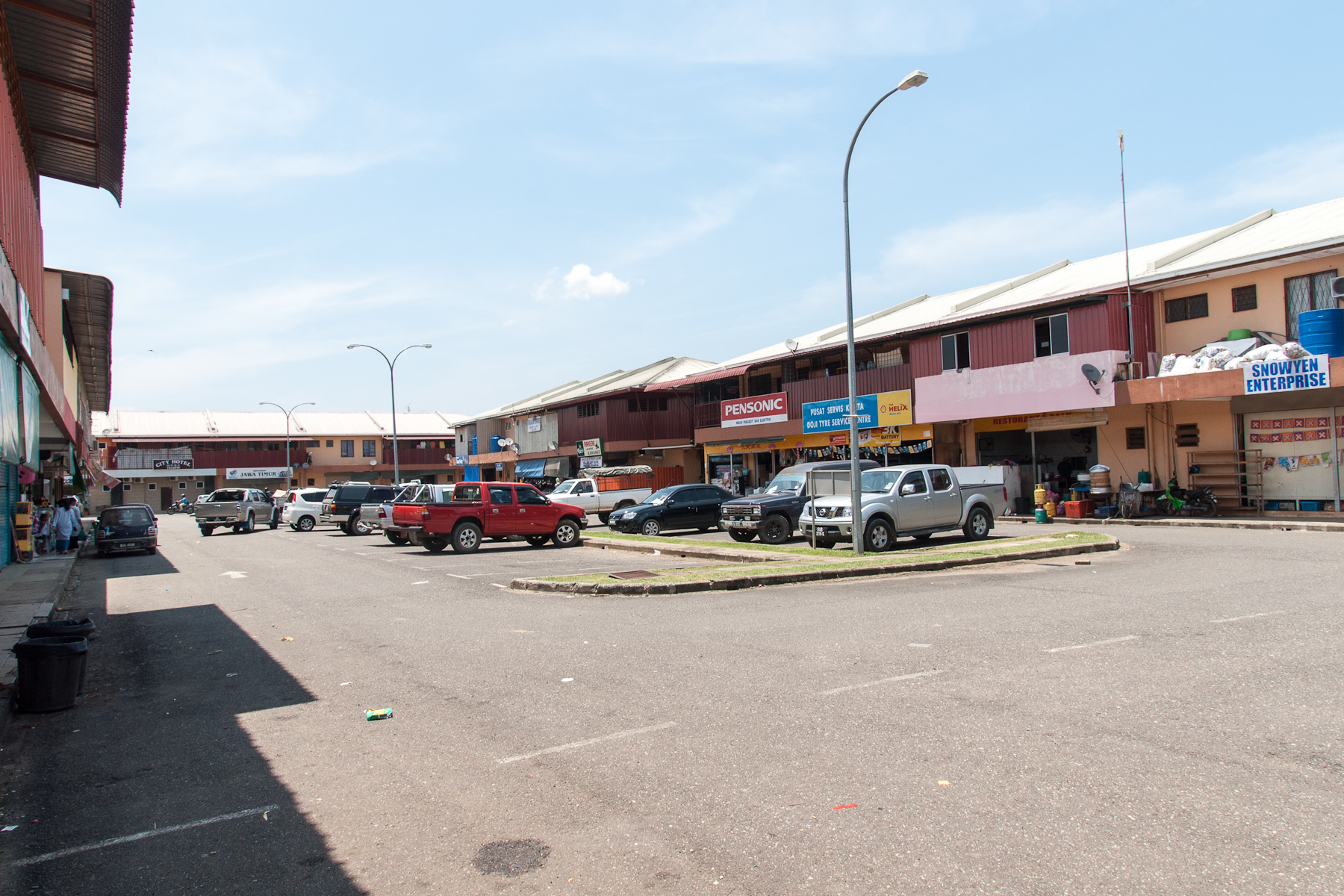
- Telupid town centre.

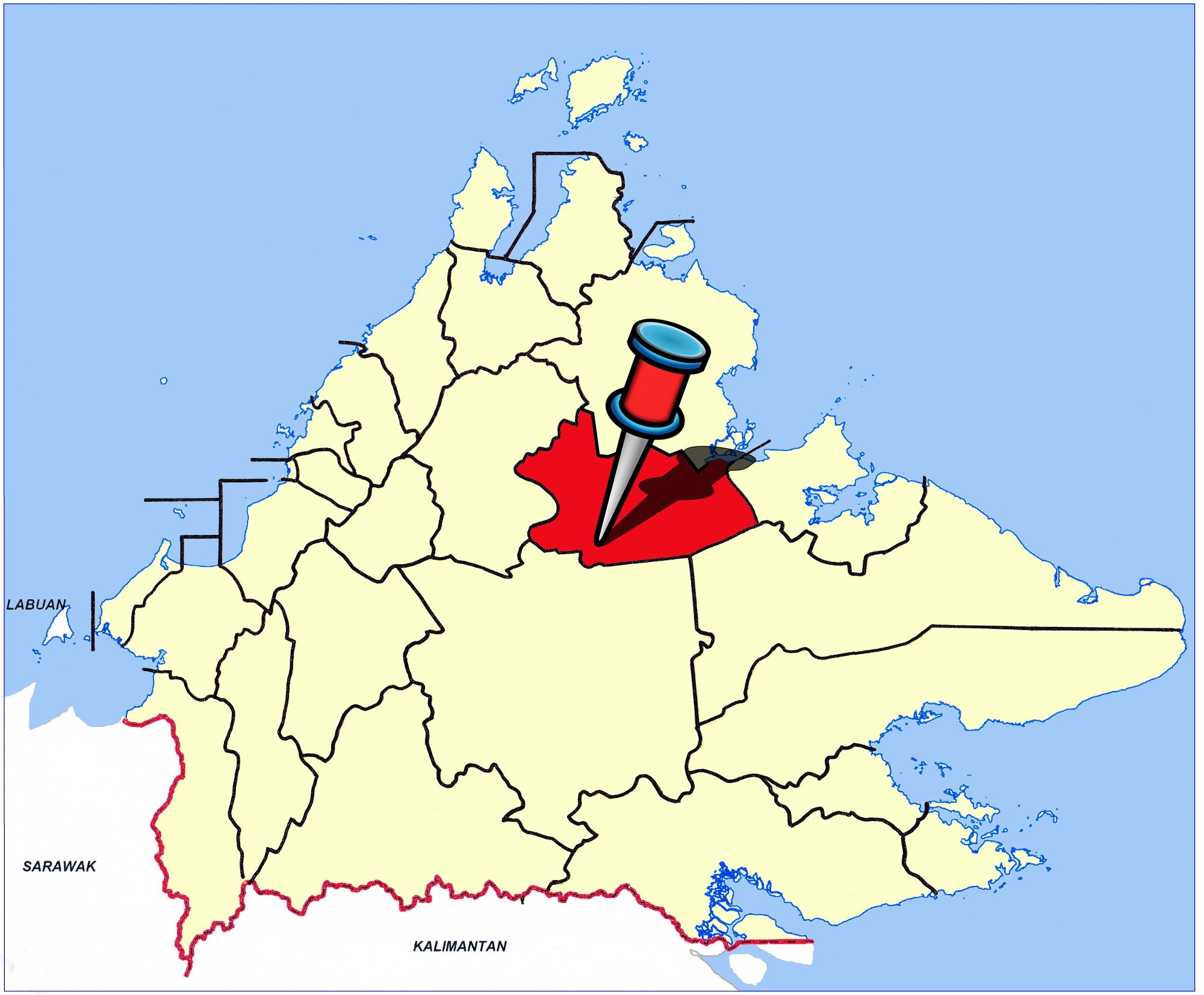
- Coordinates: 5°39′0″N 117°07′0″E
- Country: Malaysia
- State: Sabah
- Division: Sandakan
- District: Telupid

Telupid (Malay: Pekan Telupid) is the capital of the Telupid District in the Sandakan Division of Sabah, Malaysia.

== History ==
Telupid was first settled around 1940s and became the major route for the Sandakan Death Marches during World War II. At the time, it was mainly inhabited by the Dusun people. In 1968, as part of the wider Colombo Plan initiative, a major road begun to be constructed connecting Sandakan to Kota Kinabalu. Dubbed "Malaysian-Australian Road Project" (MARP), Telupid became the project's main office. The road was finally completed in 1978, making driving possible between the west and east coast of Sabah with relative ease. Since then, Telupid has become a major stopover point for travelers plying the road. From 2017, more development began to be carried out due to its strategic location in the middle of Sabah and its continued importance as a stopover point for travelers plying between the coasts of the state.

== Climate ==
Telupid has a tropical rainforest climate (Af) with heavy rainfall year-round.

Climate data for Telupid
Month	Jan	Feb	Mar	Apr	May	Jun	Jul	Aug	Sep	Oct	Nov	Dec	Year
Mean daily maximum °C (°F)	29.2 (84.6)	29.3 (84.7)	30.0 (86.0)	30.9 (87.6)	31.3 (88.3)	31.1 (88.0)	30.9 (87.6)	31.0 (87.8)	30.8 (87.4)	30.5 (86.9)	30.0 (86.0)	29.6 (85.3)	30.4 (86.7)
Daily mean °C (°F)	25.9 (78.6)	25.9 (78.6)	26.4 (79.5)	27.0 (80.6)	27.2 (81.0)	27.0 (80.6)	26.7 (80.1)	26.8 (80.2)	26.7 (80.1)	26.6 (79.9)	26.3 (79.3)	26.1 (79.0)	26.6 (79.8)
Mean daily minimum °C (°F)	22.6 (72.7)	22.6 (72.7)	22.8 (73.0)	23.1 (73.6)	23.2 (73.8)	22.9 (73.2)	22.6 (72.7)	22.6 (72.7)	22.6 (72.7)	22.7 (72.9)	22.7 (72.9)	22.7 (72.9)	22.8 (73.0)
Average rainfall mm (inches)	352 (13.9)	246 (9.7)	208 (8.2)	152 (6.0)	222 (8.7)	241 (9.5)	213 (8.4)	232 (9.1)	249 (9.8)	225 (8.9)	246 (9.7)	301 (11.9)	2,887 (113.8)
Source: Climate-Data.org
