= Tambunan District =

Tambuunan District
- District
- Daerah Banana

Other transcription(s)
  - Jawi: داءيره تمبونن
  - Chinese: 担布南县 (Simplified) 擔布南縣 (Traditional); Dānbùnán xiàn (Hanyu Pinyin)
  - Tamil: தம்புனான் மாவட்டம் Tampuṉāṉ māvaṭṭam (Transliteration)
  - Kadazandusun: Watas Tambunan
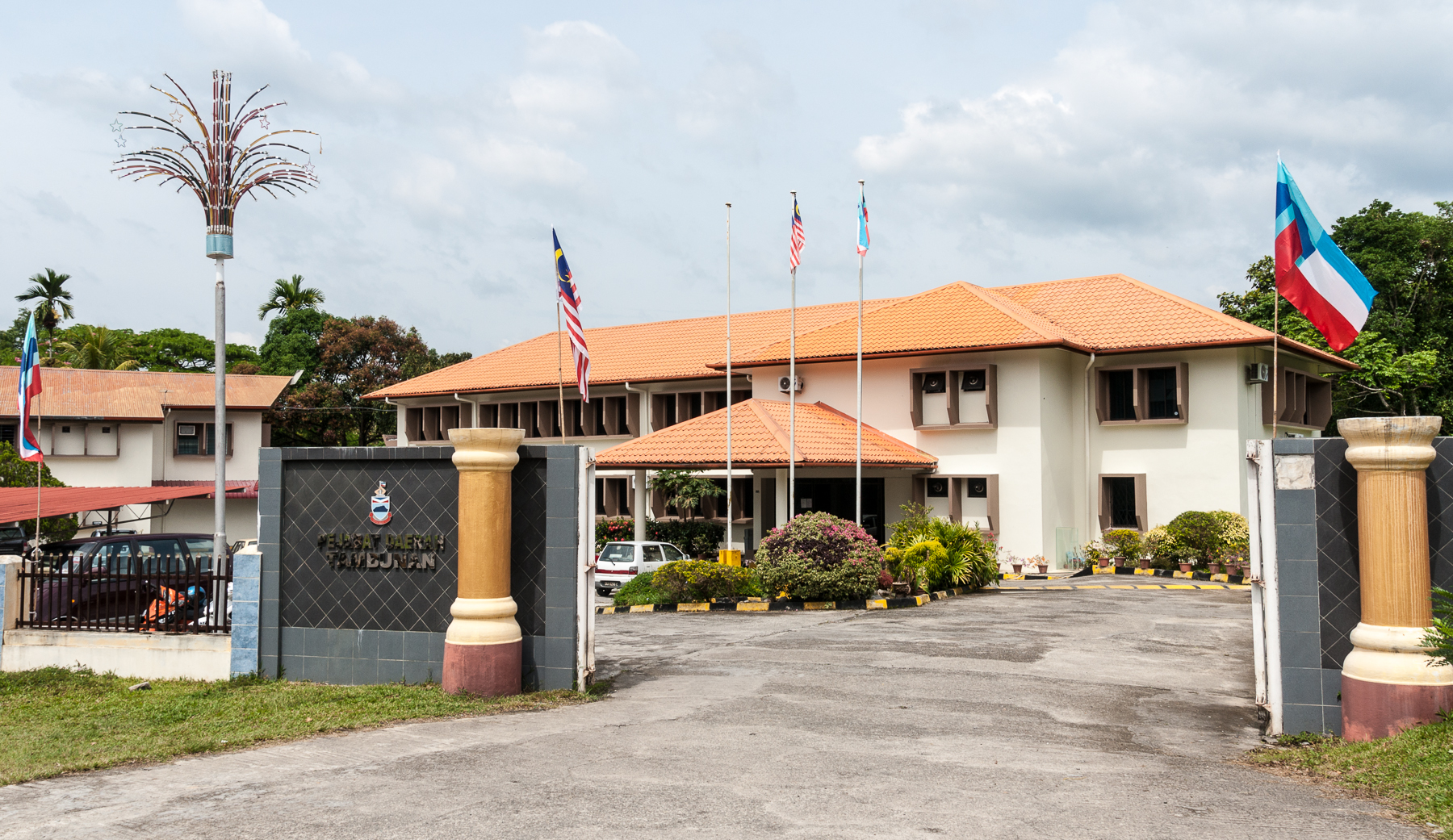
- Tambunan District Council office.

- Seal
- Nickname: "the place where the Warrior, Gombunan and Tamadon were born."
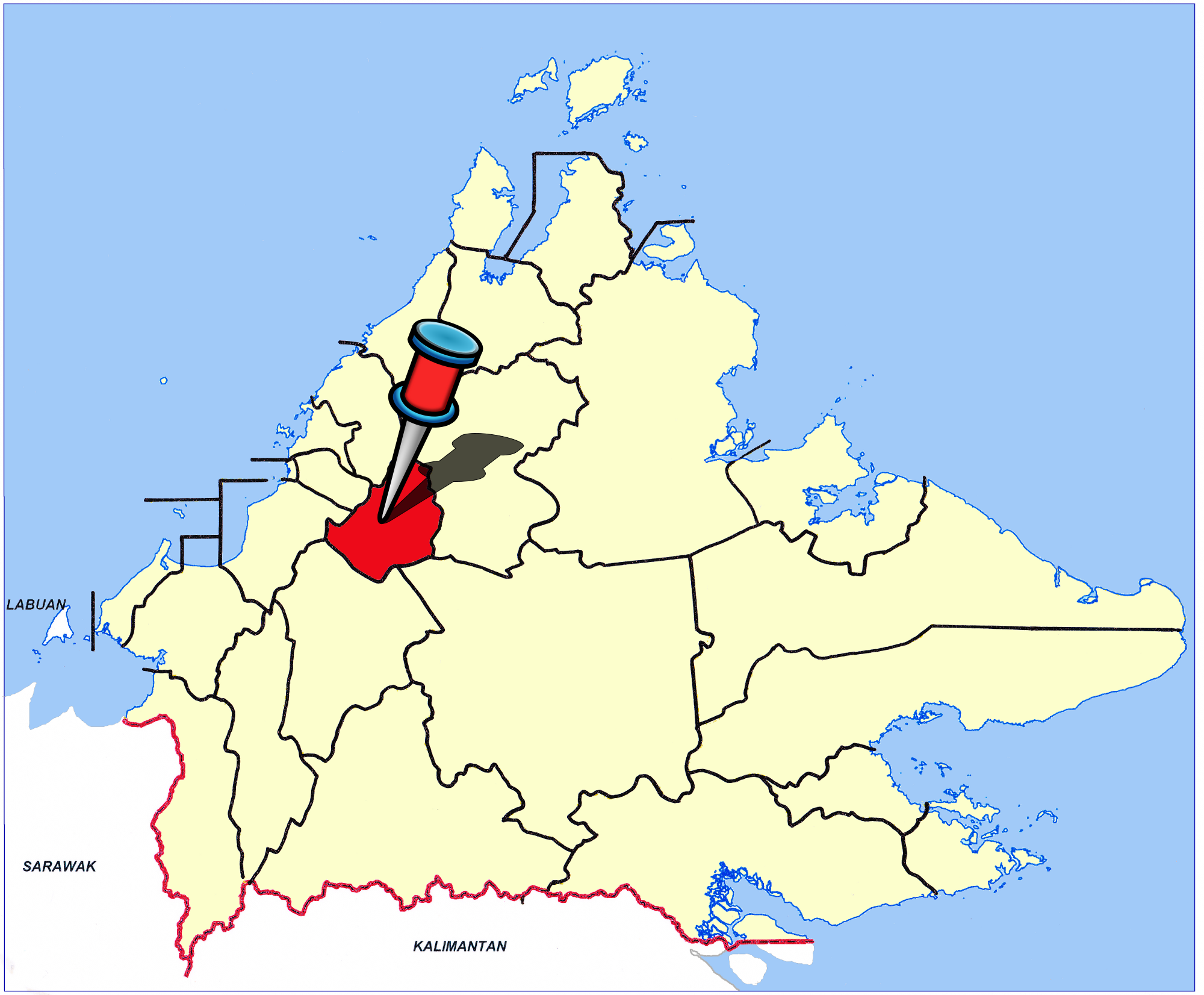
- Coordinates: 5°40′26.47″N 116°21′53.58″E
- Country: Malaysia
- State: Sabah
- Division: Interior
- Capital: Tambunan

Government
  - District Officer: Blasius Sobitun Makajil

Area
  - Total: 1,347 km^{2} (520 sq mi)

Population (2010)
  - Total: 35,667
- Website: mdtambunan.sbh.gov.my pdtambunan.sbh.gov.my

Map of Tambunan District

The Tambunan District (Malay: Daerah Tambunan) is an administrative district in the Malaysian state of Sabah, part of the Interior Division which includes the districts of Beaufort, Keningau, Kuala Penyu, Nabawan, Sipitang, Tambunan and Tenom. The capital of the district is in Tambunan Town.

== History ==
In 1946, Tambunan was managed under the administration of the Keningau District Office, as well as being a sub-district before elevated to a full district at 1948, three years after World War II.

== Etymology ==
The name of this area is taken from the word "Tamadon" and "Gombunan" which combined into "Tambunan".

== Geography ==
Tambunan sits north near the center of the state, covering an area about 1,347 km2 (520 sq mi). It was a landlocked district, and shares border with other Sabahan district like Ranau to the northeast, Penampang to the northwest, Keningau to the southwest, Papar to the west, Tuaran to the north, Sook to the south, and Tongod to the southeast. It is also situated and nestled in a valley of Crocker Range and Trusmadi Range. The district is homes to Malaysia's second highest mountain, Mount Trusmadi.

Tambunan has a climate of mild tropical rainforest, with the average temperature is 21.4°C (70.5 °F) annually and high annual precipitation of approximately 3,874 mm, with rain occurring even during drier months.

== Demographics ==
According to the last census in 2010, the population of the district is estimated to be around 35,667 inhabitants. The district of Tambunan is populated mainly by the indigenous group of Kadazan-Dusun (86%), while the rest of the population are Malay, Chinese and other indigenous groups.

== Gallery ==
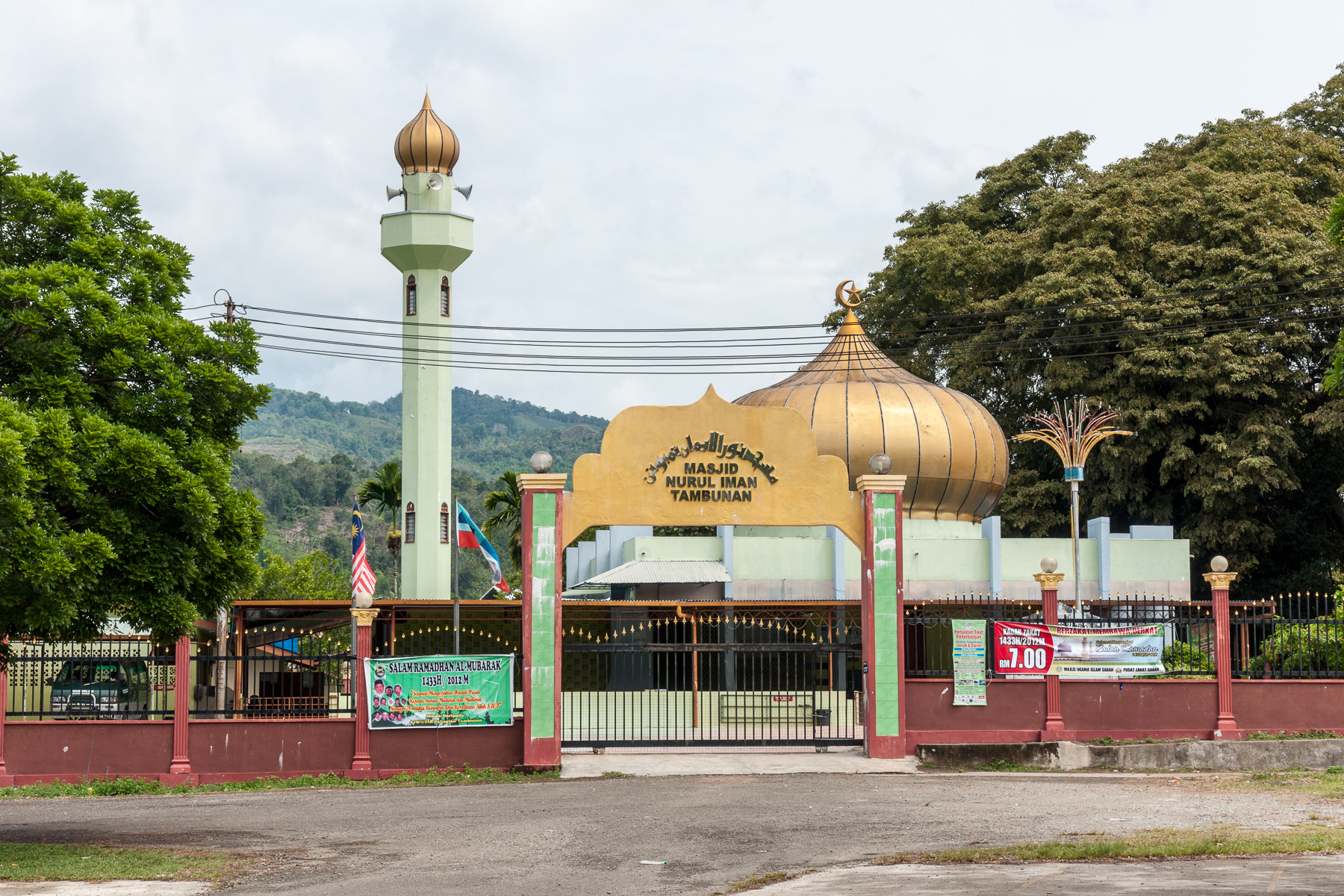
Nurul Iman Mosque

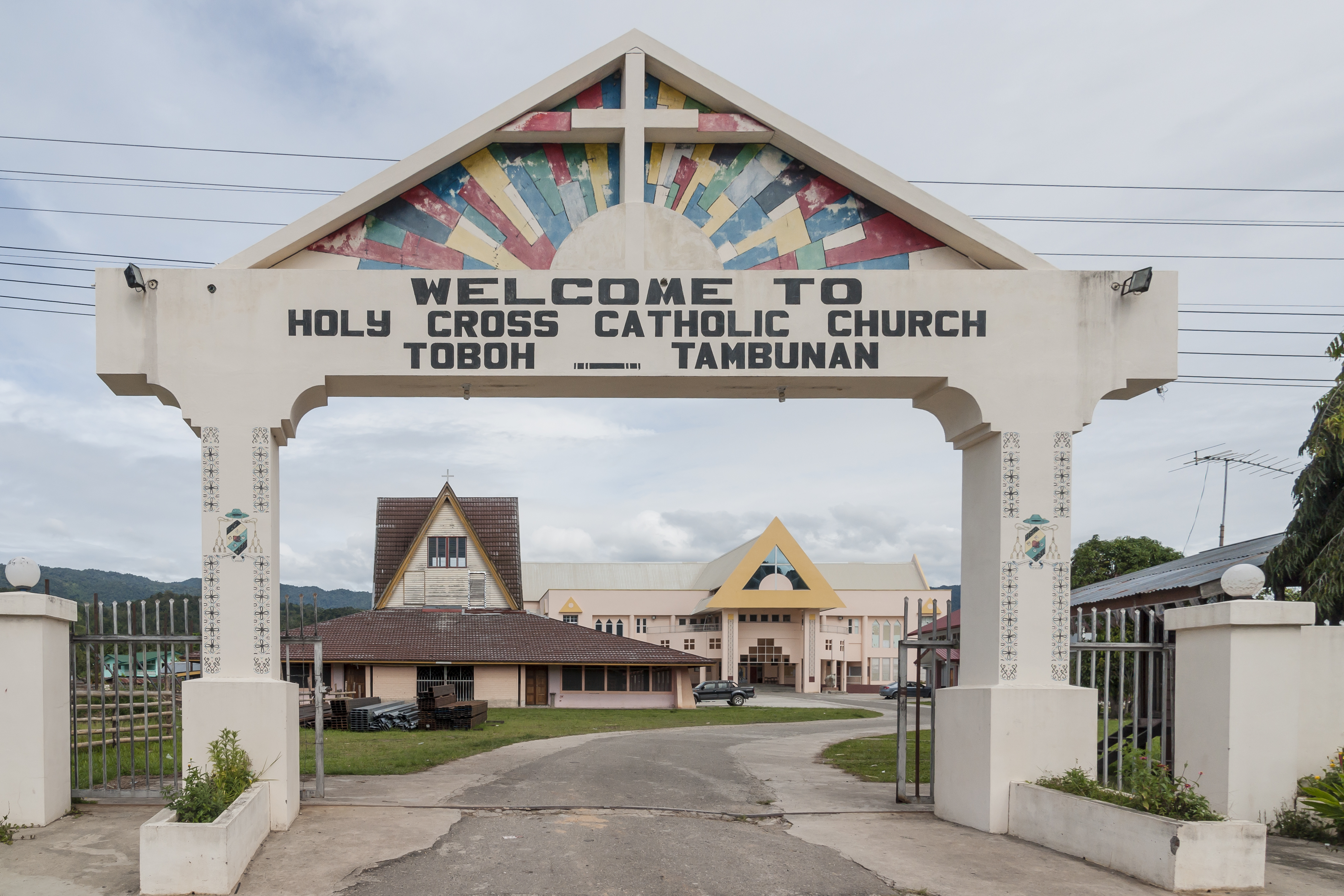
Holy Cross Catholic Church.

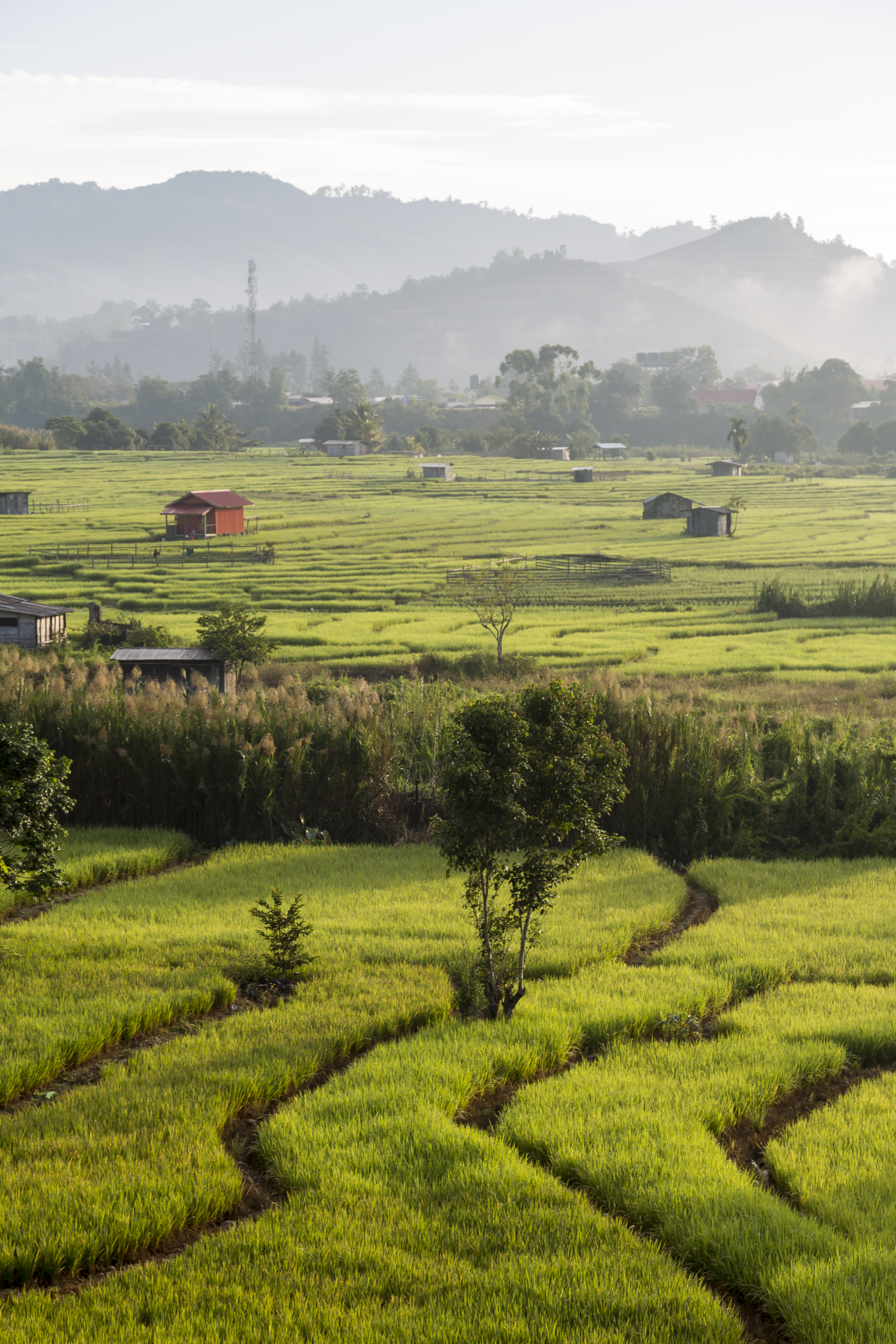
Tambunan paddy field.

== See also ==
- Districts of Malaysia
