= Tongod =

Tongod Town Pekan Tongod
- District Capital
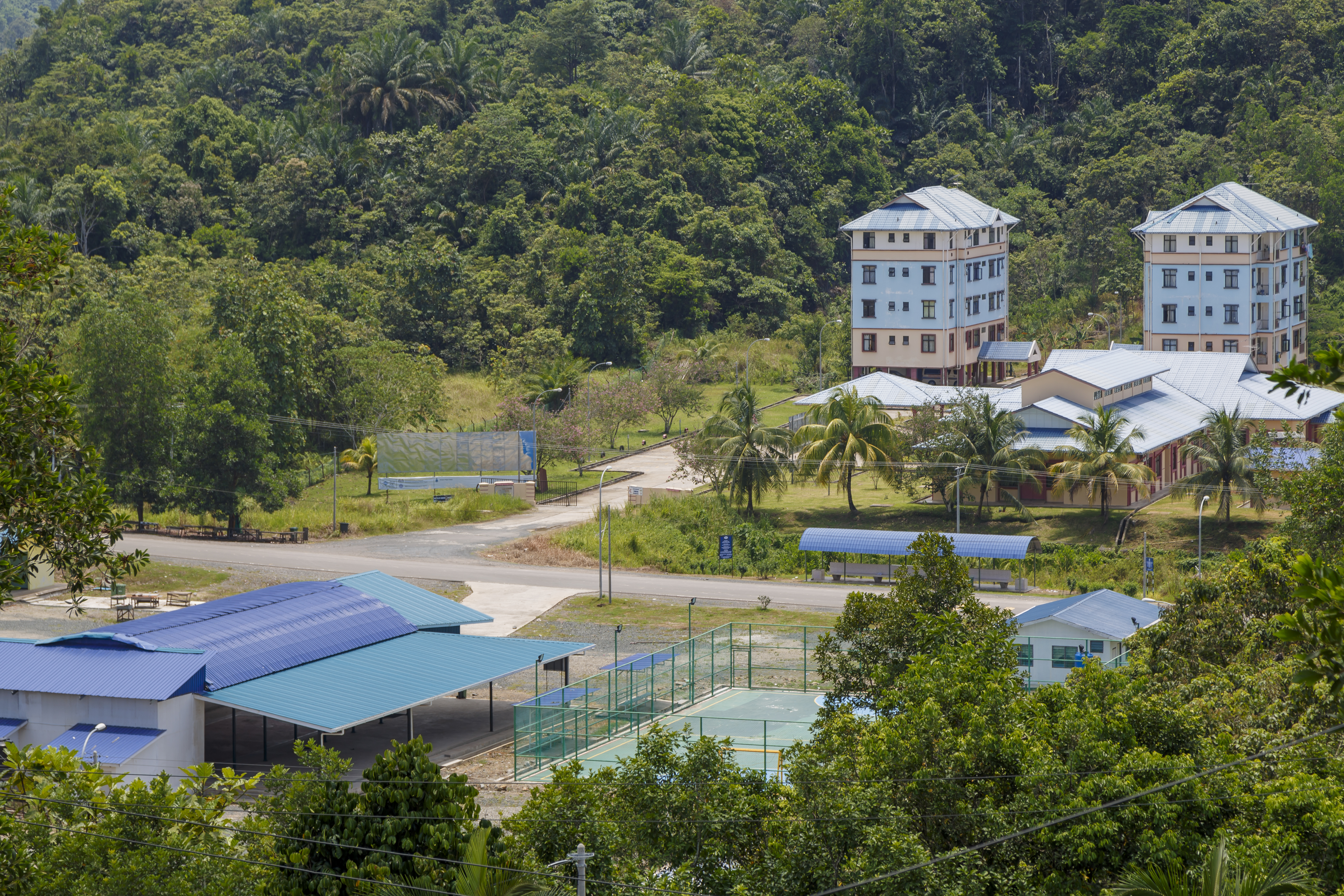
- Hospital Tongod, seen from Bangunan Urusetia Tongod

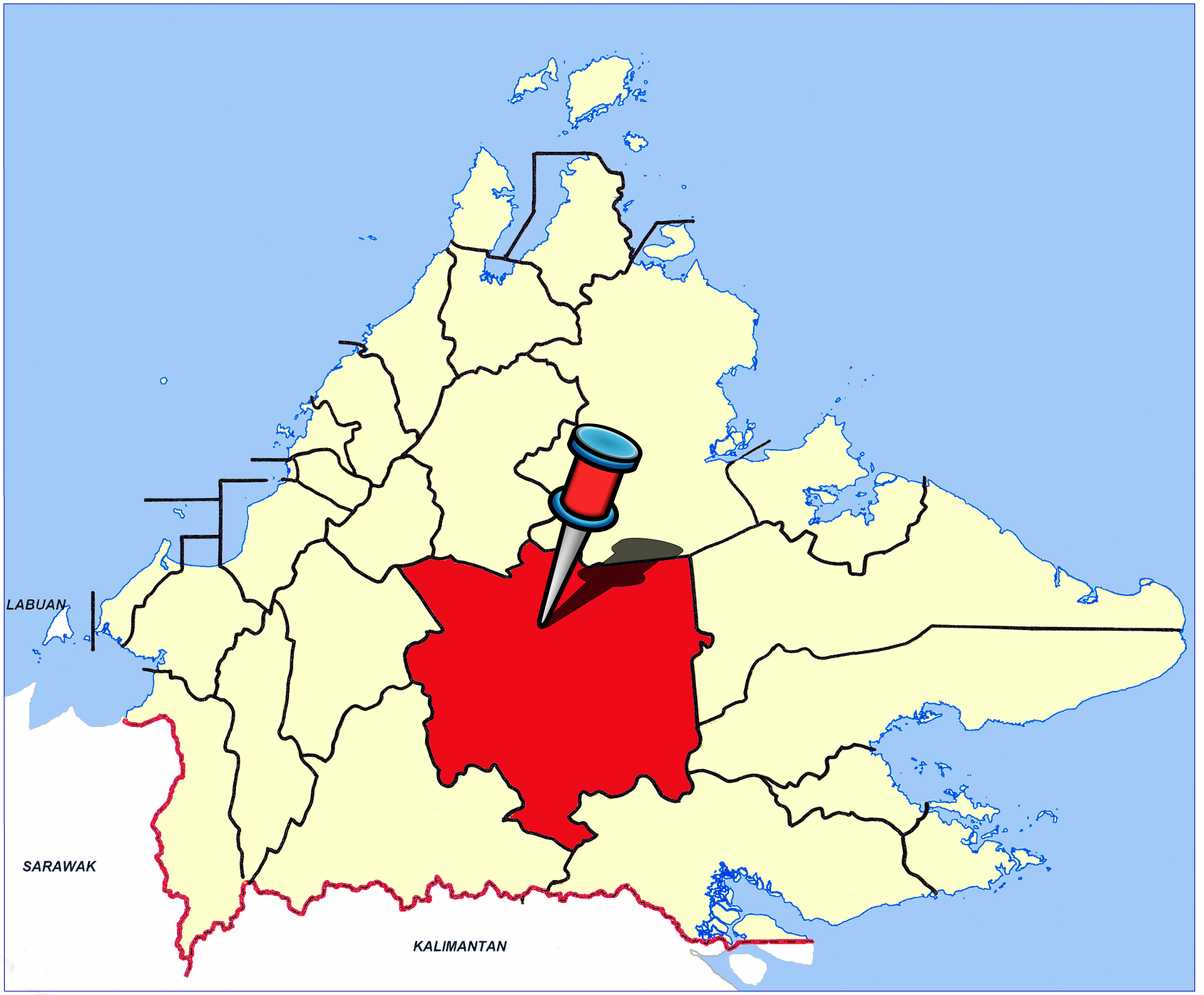
- Coordinates: 5°15′36″N 116°59′07″E
- Country: Malaysia
- State: Sabah
- Division: Sandakan
- District: Tongod

Tongod (Malay: Pekan Tongod) is the capital of the Tongod District in the Sandakan Division of Sabah, Malaysia.

== Climate ==
Tongod has a tropical rainforest climate (Af) with heavy rainfall year-round.

Climate data for Tongod
| Month | Jan | Feb | Mar | Apr | May | Jun | Jul | Aug | Sep | Oct | Nov | Dec | Year |
|---|---|---|---|---|---|---|---|---|---|---|---|---|---|
| Mean daily maximum °C (°F) | 29.2 (84.6) | 29.3 (84.7) | 29.9 (85.8) | 30.7 (87.3) | 31.1 (88.0) | 30.9 (87.6) | 30.7 (87.3) | 30.7 (87.3) | 30.5 (86.9) | 30.4 (86.7) | 30.0 (86.0) | 29.6 (85.3) | 30.3 (86.5) |
| Daily mean °C (°F) | 25.9 (78.6) | 25.9 (78.6) | 26.3 (79.3) | 26.9 (80.4) | 27.2 (81.0) | 26.9 (80.4) | 26.6 (79.9) | 26.6 (79.9) | 26.5 (79.7) | 26.5 (79.7) | 26.4 (79.5) | 26.1 (79.0) | 26.5 (79.7) |
| Mean daily minimum °C (°F) | 22.6 (72.7) | 22.6 (72.7) | 22.8 (73.0) | 23.2 (73.8) | 23.3 (73.9) | 23.0 (73.4) | 22.6 (72.7) | 22.6 (72.7) | 22.6 (72.7) | 22.7 (72.9) | 22.8 (73.0) | 22.7 (72.9) | 22.8 (73.0) |
| Average rainfall mm (inches) | 253 (10.0) | 198 (7.8) | 189 (7.4) | 172 (6.8) | 247 (9.7) | 236 (9.3) | 193 (7.6) | 221 (8.7) | 241 (9.5) | 215 (8.5) | 227 (8.9) | 245 (9.6) | 2,637 (103.8) |
Source: Climate-Data.org
