= Sandakan Division =

Administrative division of Sabah, Malaysia

Coordinates: 5.5000°N 117.5000°E

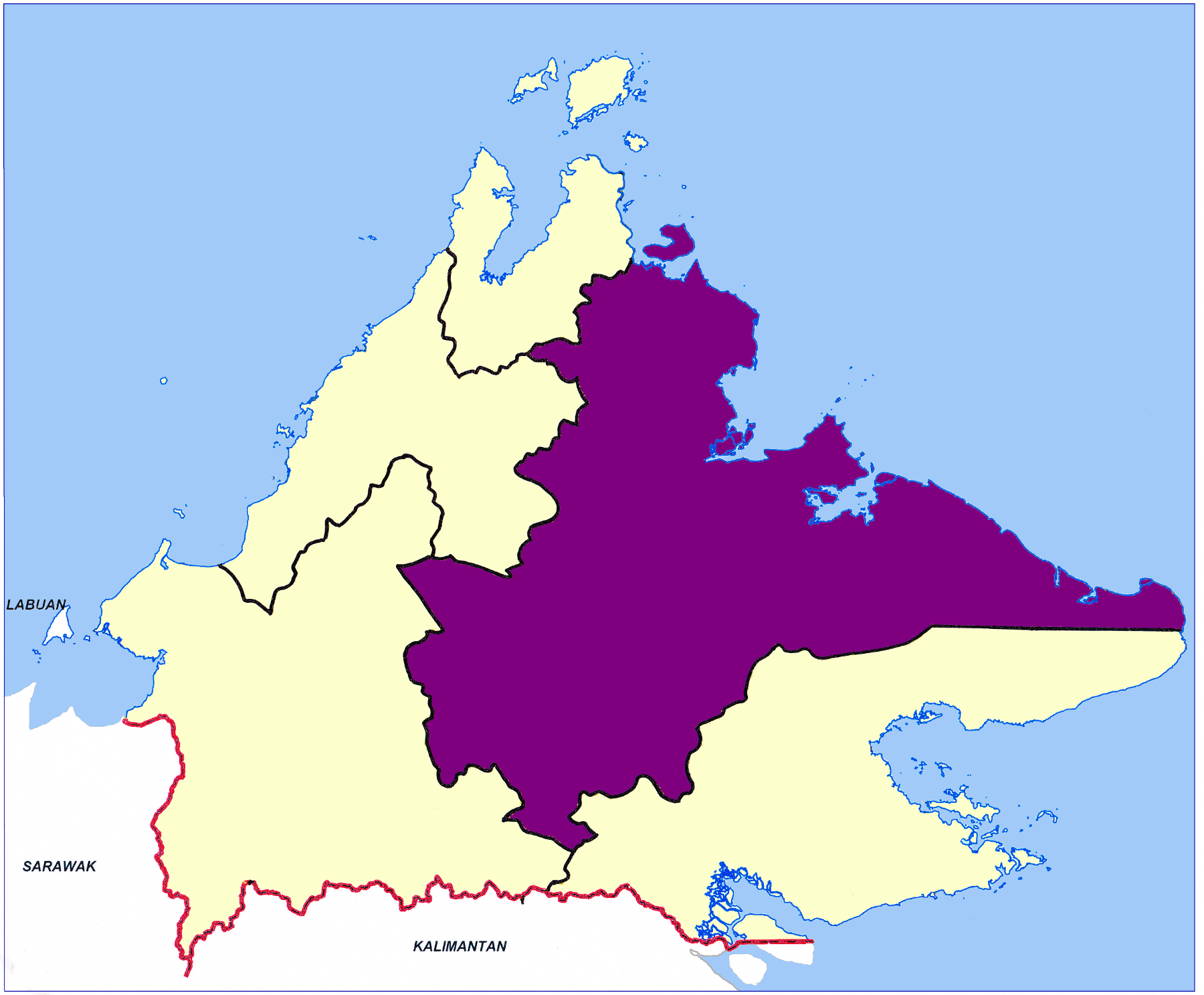
Location map of the Sandakan Division.

Sandakan Division (Malay: Bahagian Sandakan) is an administrative division of Sabah, Malaysia. It stretches diagonally from the northeastern coast of Sabah to the state's central region. With an area of 28,205 square kilometres, it occupies 38.3% of Sabah's territory, and is thus the largest of the five administrative divisions of Sabah. It also has approximately 19.4% of Sabah's total population, with the major inhabitants comprising the Chinese, Orang Sungai, Kadazan-Dusun, Suluk and Bajau Simunul.

The main towns are Sandakan, Beluran, Kinabatangan, Telupid and Tongod. Sandakan port is the second largest after Kota Kinabalu. The port serves as a major timber export gateway. The Sandakan Airport serves the Sandakan division.

== Districts ==
Sandakan Division is subdivided into the following administrative districts:

- Beluran District (8,345 km^{2}) (Beluran Town)
- Kinabatangan District (8,000 km^{2}) (Kinabatangan Town)
- Sandakan District (2,266 km^{2}) (Sandakan City)
- Telupid District (1,935 km^{2}) (Telupid Town)
- Tongod District (10,052 km^{2}) (Tongod Town)
- Paitan District (Paitan Town)

== Constituencies ==
Sandakan division is divided into five federal constituencies and 13 state constituencies:

Parliament			Legislative Assembly		
Constituency	MPs (2022)	Party	Constituency	MLAs (2020)	Party
P183 Beluran	Ronald Kiandee	PN (BERSATU)	N47 Telupid	Jonnybone Kurum	GRS (GAGASAN)
P183 Beluran	Ronald Kiandee	PN (BERSATU)	N48 Sugut	James Ratib	GRS (PBS)
P183 Beluran	Ronald Kiandee	PN (BERSATU)	N49 Labuk	Samad Jambri	GRS (GAGASAN)
P184 Libaran	Suhaimi Nasir	BN (UMNO)	N50 Gum-Gum	Arunarsin Taib	WARISAN
P184 Libaran	Suhaimi Nasir	BN (UMNO)	N51 Sungai Manila	Mokran Ingkat	BN (UMNO)
P184 Libaran	Suhaimi Nasir	BN (UMNO)	N52 Sungai Sibuga	Vacant	
P185 Batu Sapi	Khairul Firdaus Akbar Khan	GRS (Direct)	N53 Sekong	Alias Sani	WARISAN
P185 Batu Sapi	Khairul Firdaus Akbar Khan	GRS (Direct)	N54 Karamunting	George Hiew Vun Zin	GRS (GAGASAN)
P186 Sandakan	Vivian Wong Shir Yee	PH (DAP)	N55 Elopura	Calvin Chong Ket Kiun	WARISAN
P186 Sandakan	Vivian Wong Shir Yee	PH (DAP)	N56 Tanjong Papat	Frankie Poon Ming Fung	PH (DAP)
P187 Kinabatangan	Bung Moktar Radin	BN (UMNO)	N57 Kuamut	Masiung Banah	GRS (GAGASAN)
P187 Kinabatangan	Bung Moktar Radin	BN (UMNO)	N58 Lamag	Bung Moktar Radin	BN (UMNO)
P187 Kinabatangan	Bung Moktar Radin	BN (UMNO)	N59 Sukau	Jafry Ariffin	BN (UMNO)

== History ==
The present divisions of Sabah is largely inherited from the division of the North Borneo Chartered Company. Following the acquisition of North Borneo under the royal charter issued in 1881, the administrative division introduced by Baron von Overbeck was continued by the establishment of two residences comprising West Coast Residency and East Coast Residency. Seat of the two residents was in Sandakan, where the governor was based. Each resident, in turn, was divided into several provinces managed by a district officer. (Note: The original position was initially Magistrates-in-charge.)

As North Borneo progresses, the number of residencies has increased to five including: Tawau Residency (also known as East Coast Residency), Sandakan Residency, West Coast Residency, Kudat Residency, and Interior Residency; the provinces were initially named after the members of the board: Alcock, Cunlife, Dewhurst, Keppel, Dent, Martin, Elphinstone, Myburgh and Mayne. The senior residents occupied Sandakan and the West Coast, while the other three resident with the second class residencies occupied Interior, East Coast and Kudat. The residents of Sandakan and West Coast were members of the Legislative Council, the Legislative Assembly of the Company.

The division into residencies was maintained when North Borneo became a Crown Colony after World War II. On 16 September 1963, with the formation of Malaysia, North Borneo which subsequently became the state of Sabah took over the administrative structure through the Ordinance on Administrative Units. At the same time, the Yang di-Pertua Negeri, the head of state of Sabah, was authorised by proclamation to divide the state into divisions and districts. (Note: The most recent such proclamation dates from 2009: Administrative Divisions Proclamation 2009.) The abolition of the residency term was in favour of the division term that took place in 1976.

Today, the division has only formal significance and no longer constitutes its own administrative level. The resident's post was also abolished, as Sabah's municipal administration is in the hands of the district officers.

== See also ==
- Divisions of Malaysia

== Literature ==
- Tregonning, K. G. (1965). A History Of Modern Sabah (North Borneo 1881–1963). University of Malaya Press.
