= Keningau District =

- District
- Daerah Keningau

Other transcription(s)
  - Jawi: داءيره كنيڠاو
  - Chinese: 根地咬县 (Simplified) 根地咬縣 (Traditional); Gēndeyǎo xiàn (Hanyu Pinyin)
  - Tamil: கெனிங்காவு மாவட்டம் Keṉiṅkāvu māvaṭṭam (Transliteration)
  - Kadazandusun: Watas Keningau
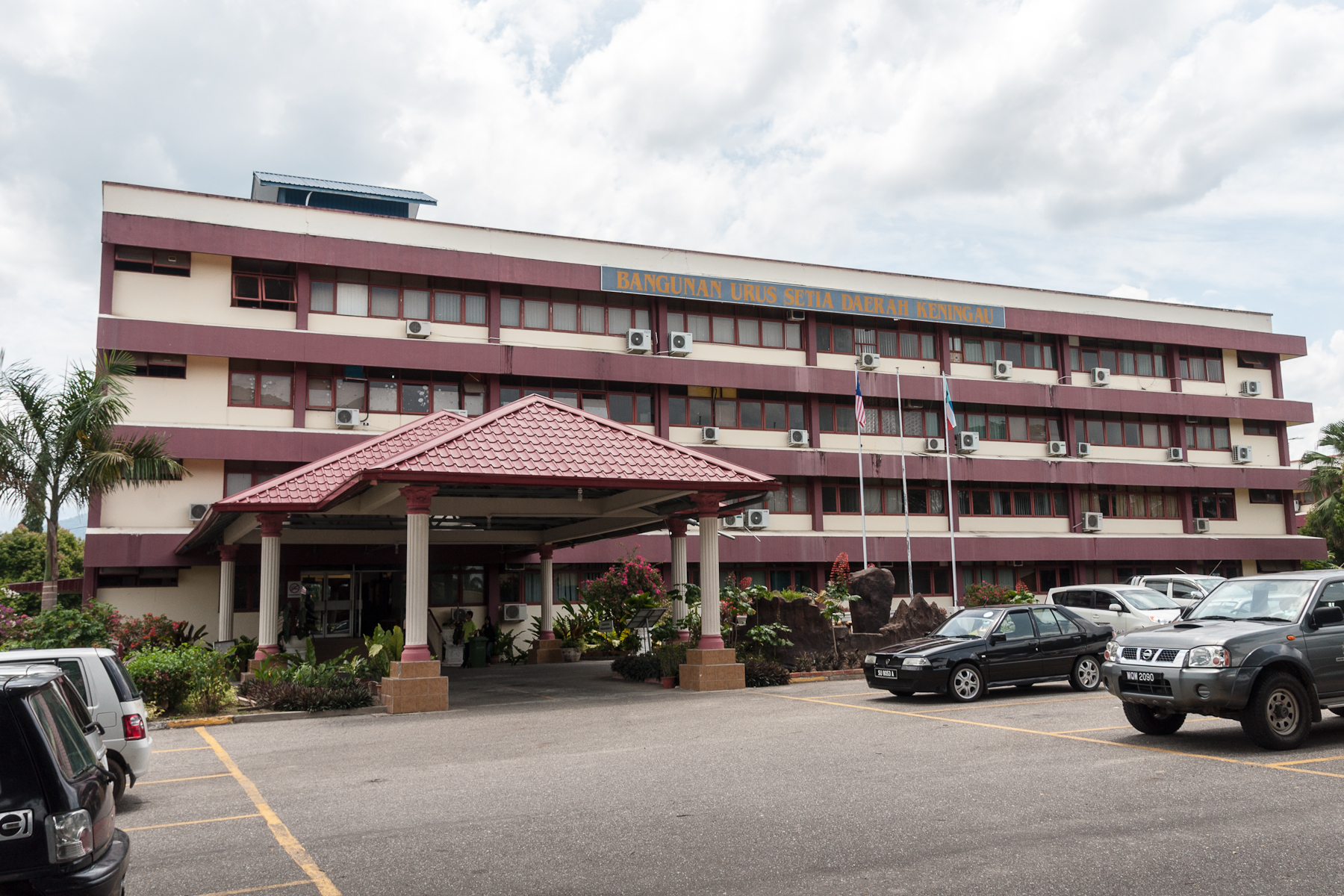
- Keningau District Council office.

- Seal

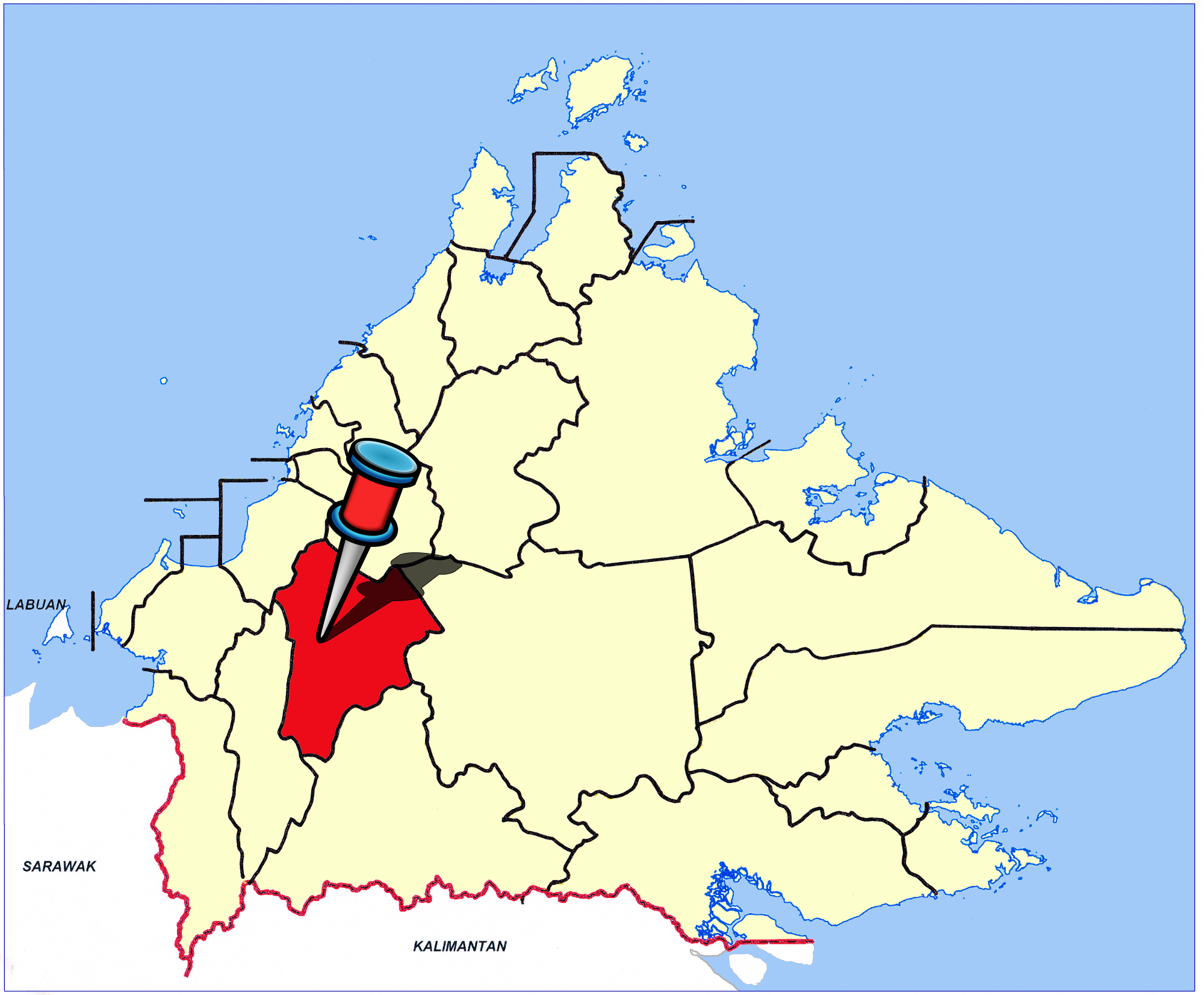
- Coordinates: 5°20′00″N 116°10′00″E
- Country: Malaysia
- State: Sabah
- Division: Interior
- Capital: Keningau

Government
  - District Officer: Peter Jonu Moinjil @ Peter Joseph Jonu

Area
  - Total: 3,533 km^{2} (1,364 sq mi)

Population (2010)
  - Total: 173,103
- Website: mdkeningau.sbh.gov.my pdkeningau.sbh.gov.my

Map of Keningau District

The Keningau District (Malay: Daerah Keningau) is an administrative district in the Malaysian state of Sabah, part of the Interior Division which includes the districts of Beaufort, Keningau, Kuala Penyu, Nabawan, Sipitang, Tambunan and Tenom. The capital of the district is in Keningau Town. The town comprises a majority native Dusun as well as Murut population with significant Chinese minorities.

== Etymology ==
The name Keningau is derived from the locally-abundant Javanese cinnamon tree (Cinnamomum burmannii) which is locally known as Koningau.

== History ==
Keningau was one of the most important administrative centres for the British North Borneo in the early years of the 20th century. The Japanese also used Keningau as a government centre during their occupation in the Second World War. The village of Nuntunan near Apin-Apin was numbered "44" in the British administration. The number stated the distance about 44 kilometres from Tenom as well as Tambunan, Penampang and Kota Kinabalu towns. Nuntunan was also called the "Office" because the British administration building was on the banks of the Apin-Apin River. The Japanese took over the building for their own administration during the occupation.

== Geography ==
The district of Keningau covers an area of 3,533 square kilometres and is located in a valley bordered to the west by the Crocker Range and to the south and east by the Mount Trus Madi. It was surrounded by Tambunan to the north, Tenom to the southwest, Nabawan to the southeast, Ranau to the northeast, and Papar to the northwest.

== Demographics ==
The population of the district of Keningau is 173,103 according to the last census in 2010. It consists of 90% of mainly Dusun and Murut peoples, as well an estimate of 8% Hakka Chinese population and various minority indigenous groups.

== Gallery ==
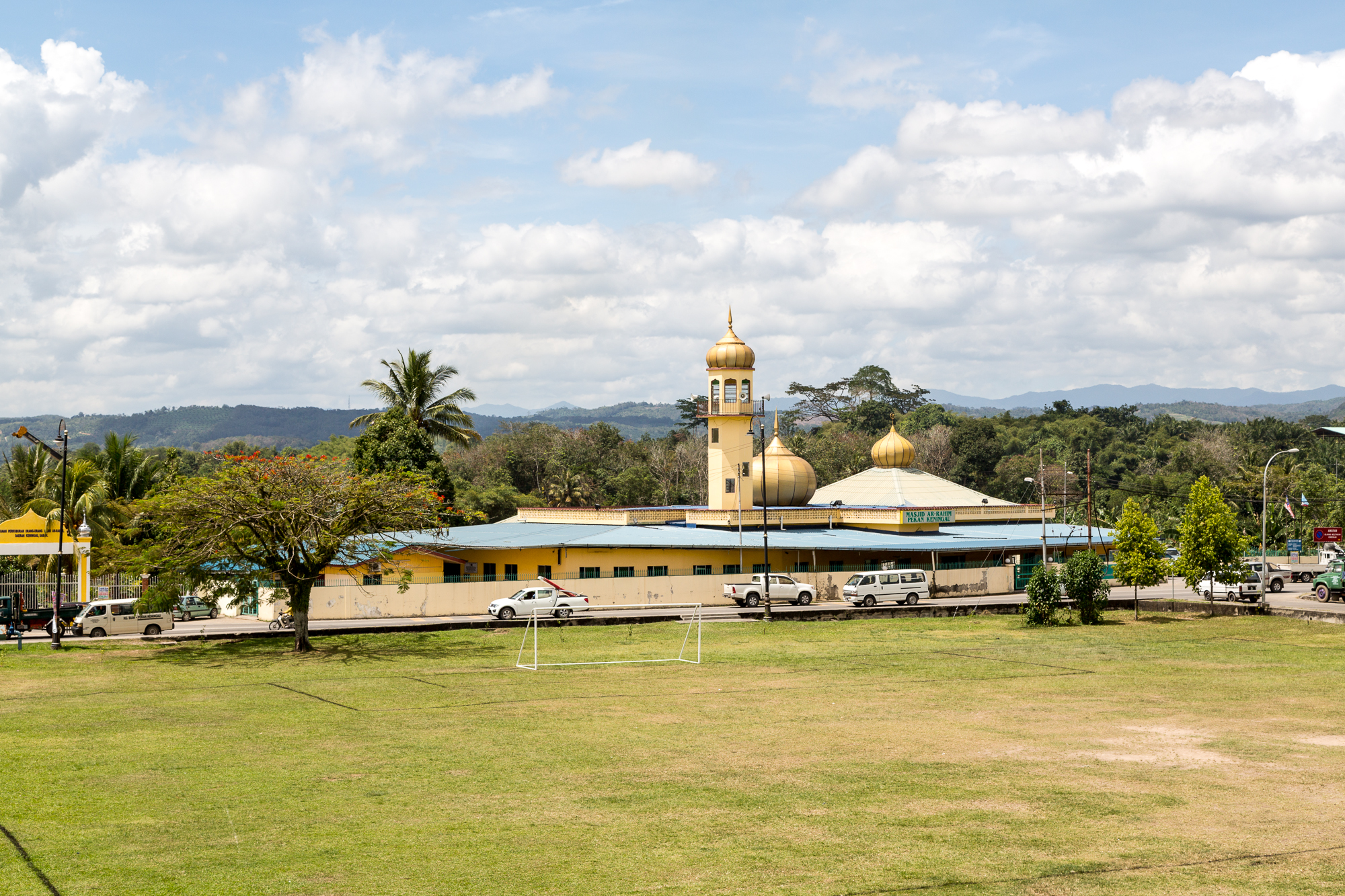
Ar-Rahim Mosque

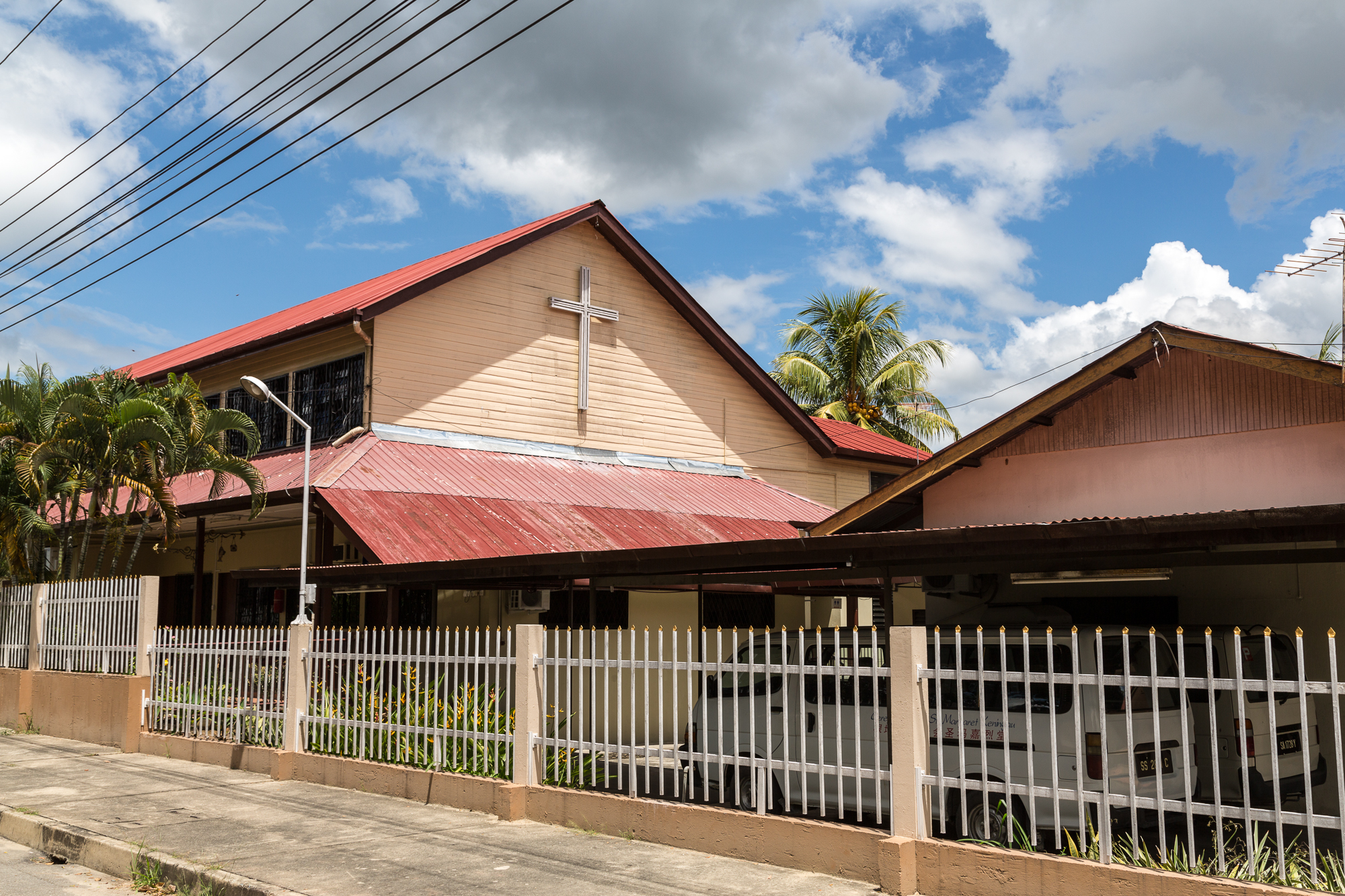
St. Margaret Anglican Church.

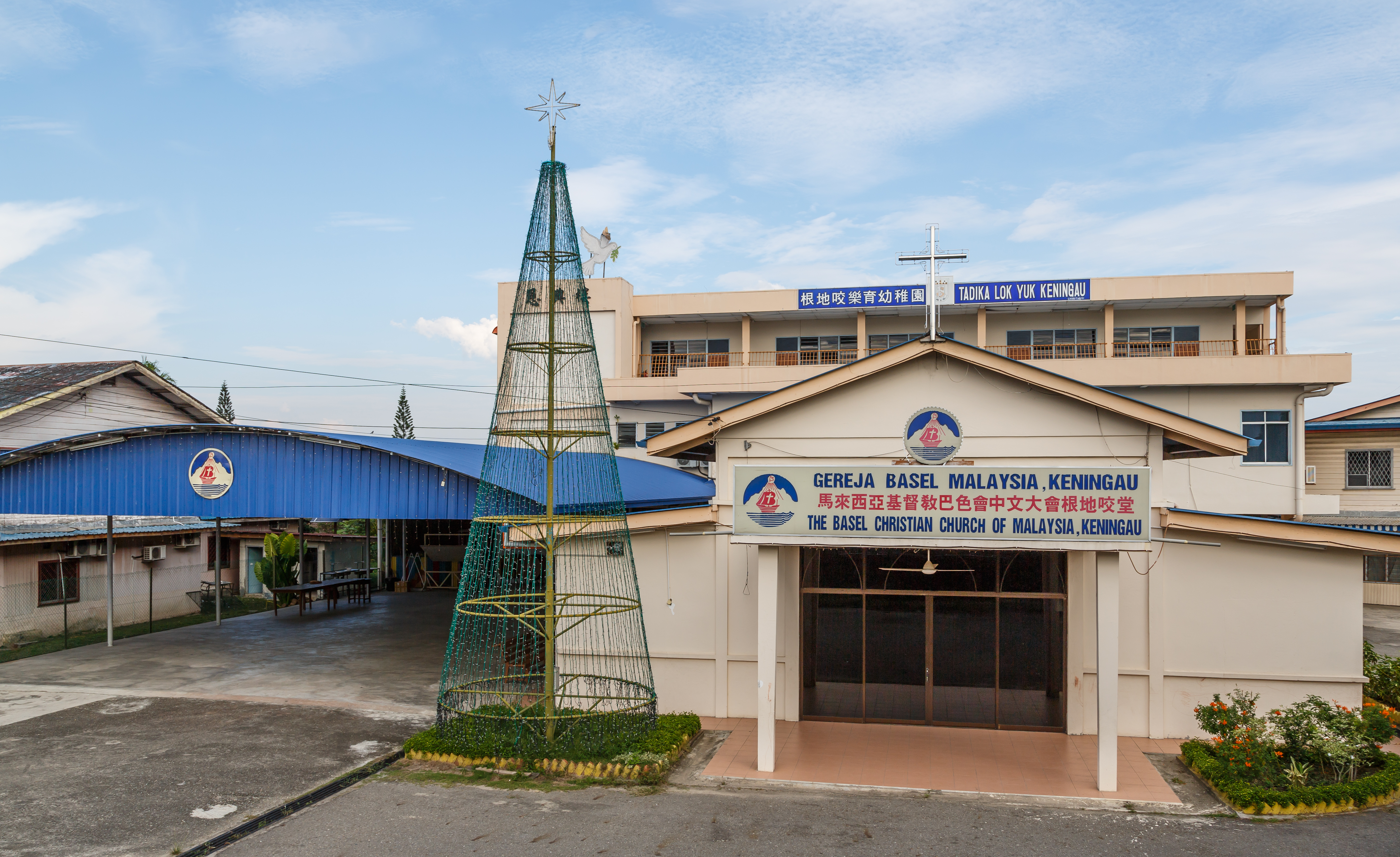
Keningau Basel Church.

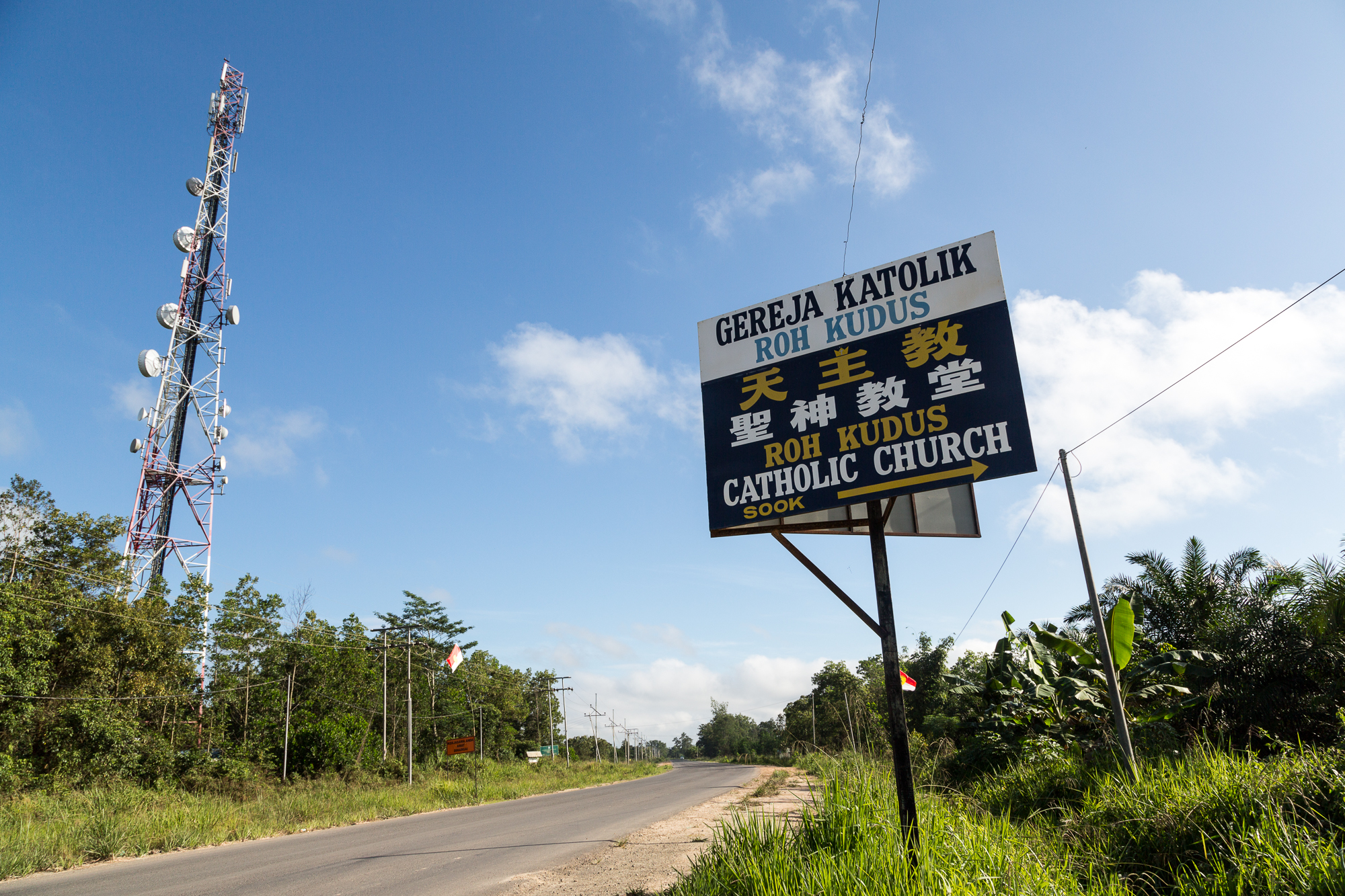
Sign board to Sook Holy Spirit Catholic Church.

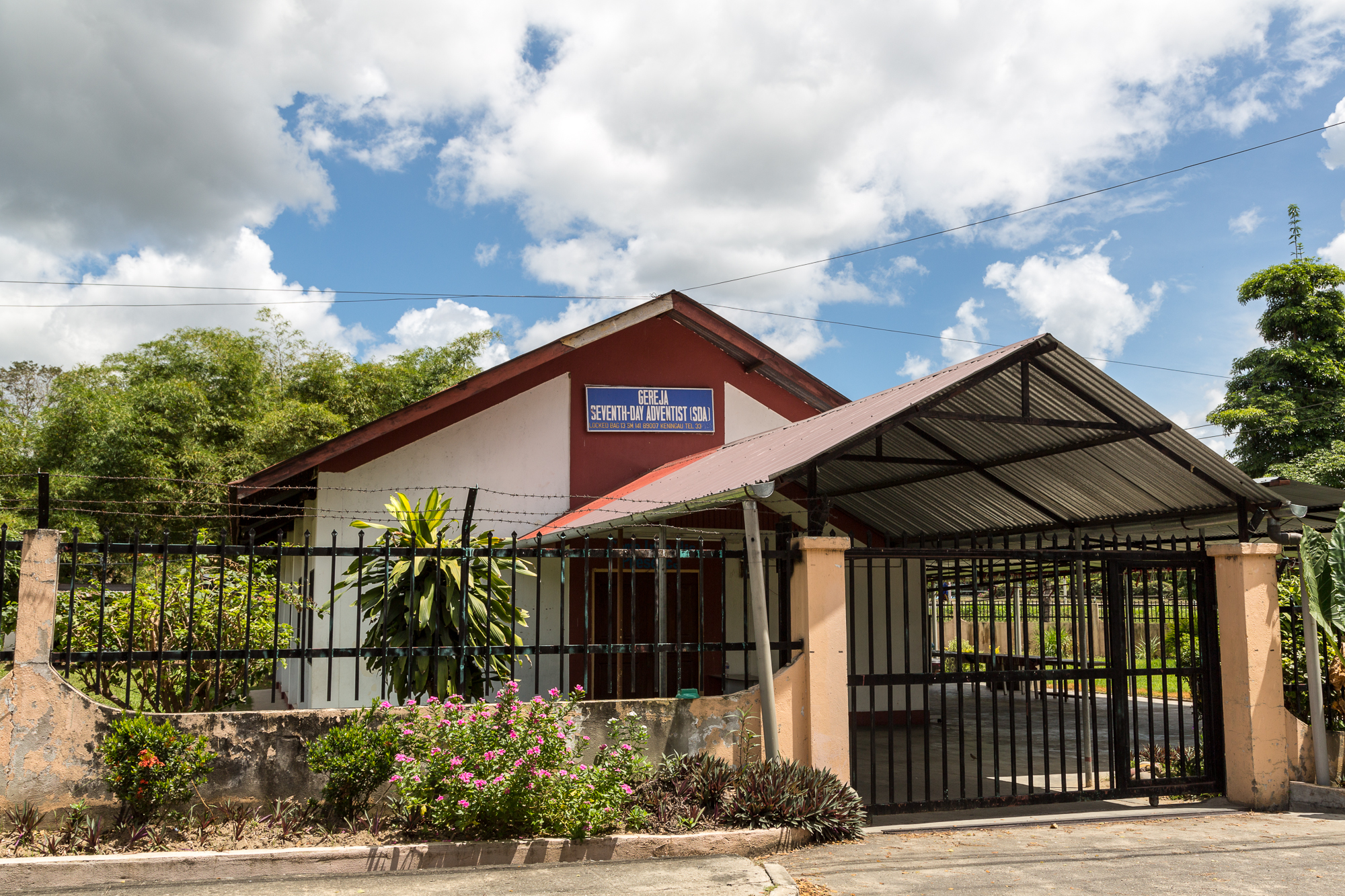
Keningau Seventh Day Adventist Church.

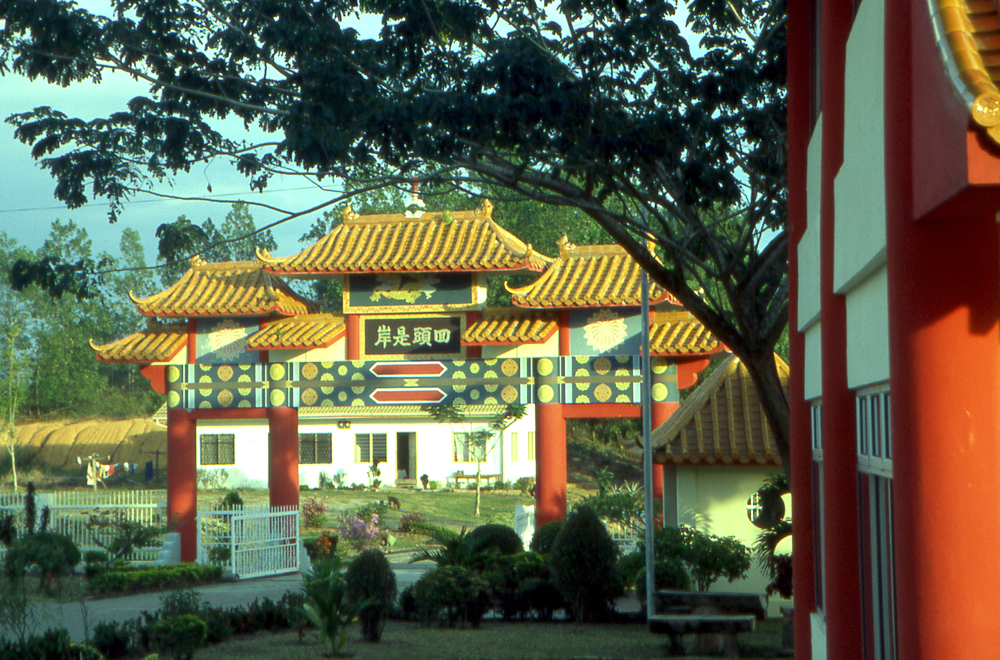
Keningau Temple.

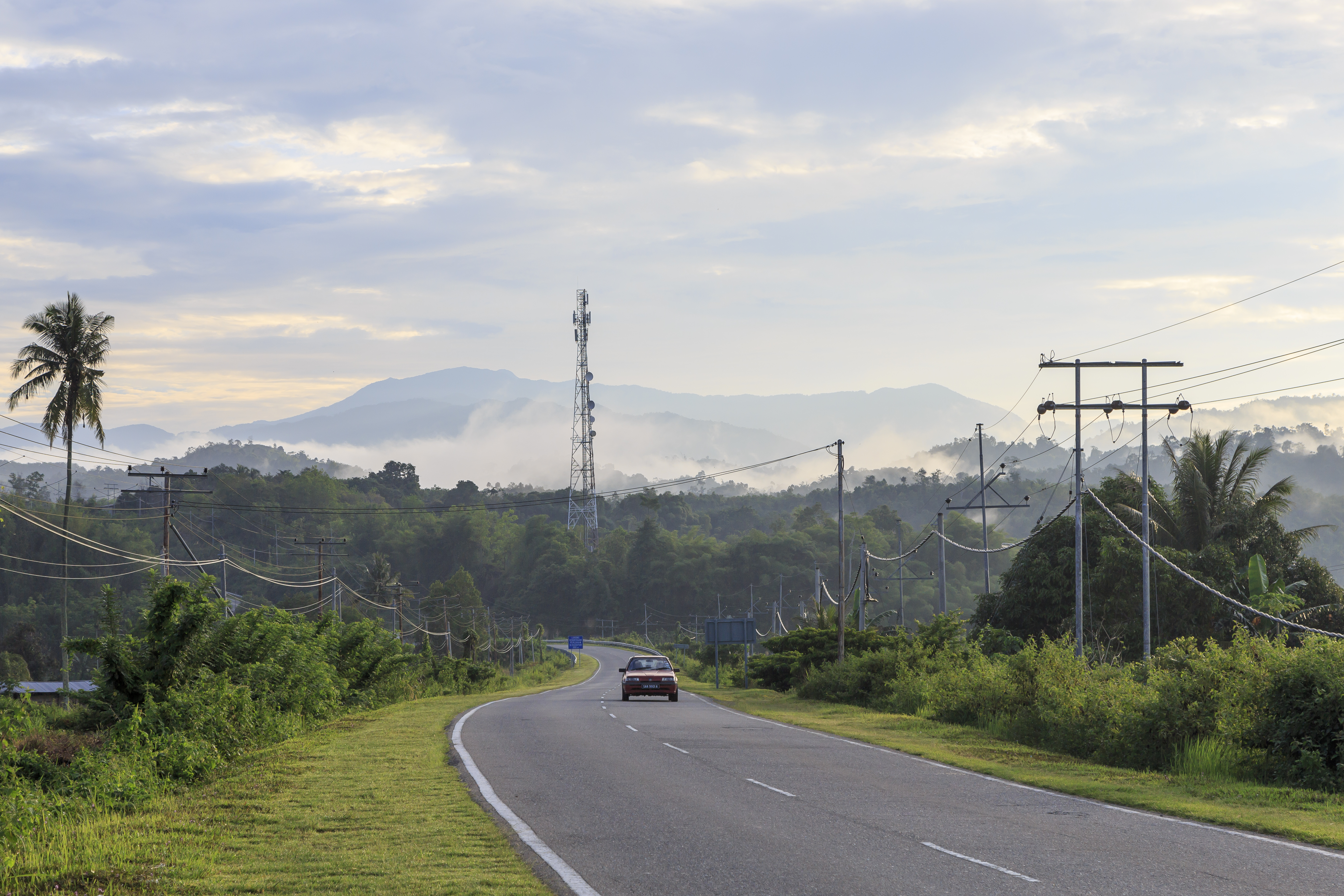
Keningau fog.

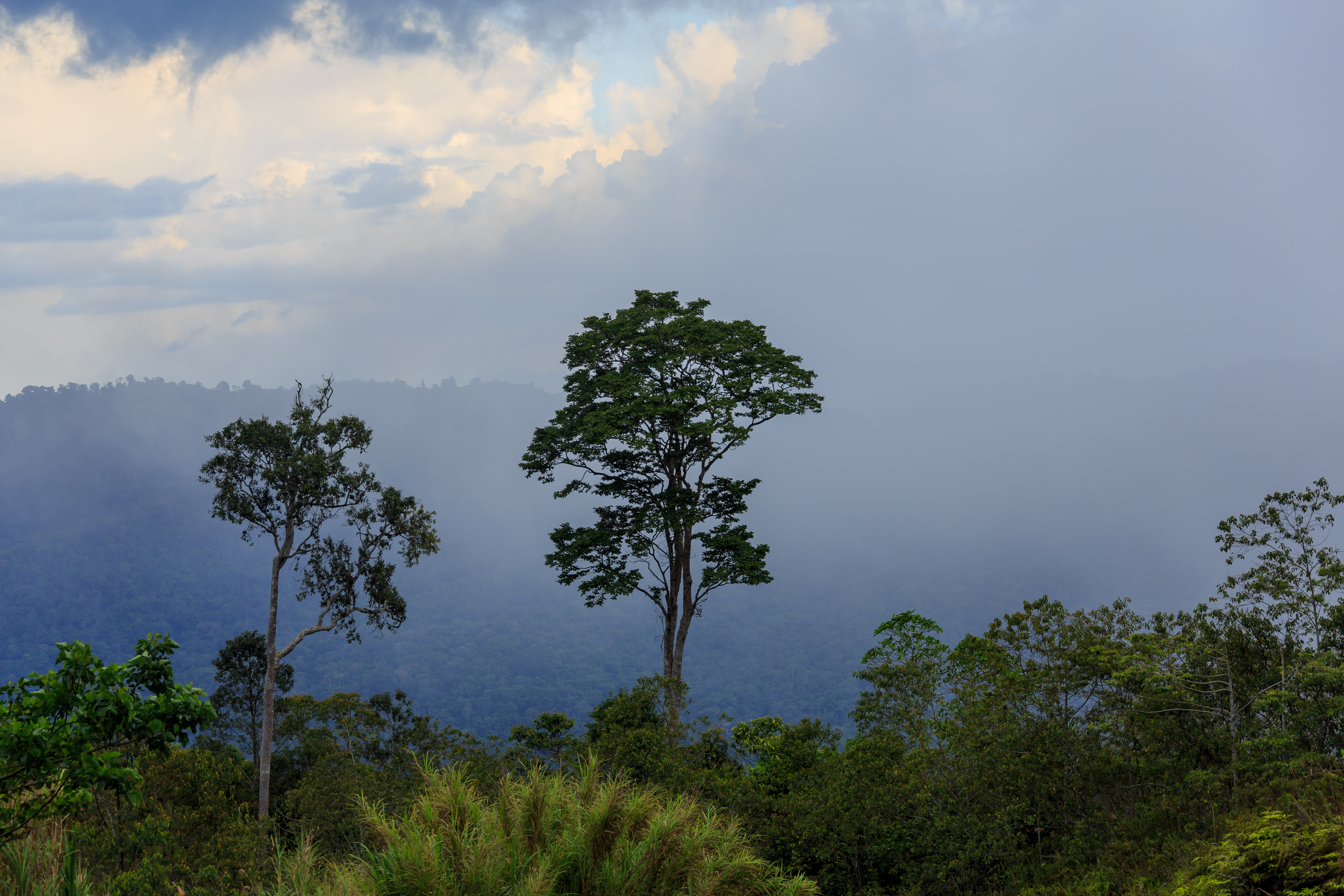
Keningau rainforest after rain.

== See also ==
- Districts of Malaysia
