= Raid on Kalabakan =

Military engagement in Tawau during the Indonesia–Malaysia Confrontation

Raid on Kalabakan (Kalabakan Incident)
- Part of Battle of Tawau and Indonesia–Malaysia confrontation
Date	29 December 1963
Location	Kalabakan, Tawau, Sabah, Malaysia 4.417°N 117.493°E
Result	Malaysian victory

Belligerents
Indonesia; North Kalimantan Communist Party	Malaysia

Commanders and leaders
(Indonesia) A. Zulklfli, Field Commander of North Borneo Operations; (Indonesia) Rebani; Bong Kee Chok	(United Kingdom) Walter Walker, Director of Borneo Operations; (United Kingdom) Jack B.A Glennie; (Malaysia) Othman Rani; (Malaysia) Zainol Abidin Yaacob (KIA); (Malaysia) Raja Shaharudin Raja Rome

Units involved
Commando Operations Corps; North Borneo Liberation Army	3rd Bn, Royal Malays; (Malaysia) Police Field Force; (Malaysia) Vigilante Corps

Casualties and losses
1 dead and 3 wounded	Security Forces: 8 dead and 18 wounded; Civilian: 1 dead and 1 wounded
- Location within Sabah

The Raid on Kalabakan, also referred to in Malaysia as the Kalabakan Incident (Malay: Peristiwa Kalabakan), was a military operation conducted by Indonesian forces, supported by communist guerrilla fighters, during the Battle of Tawau in the wider context of the Indonesia–Malaysia Confrontation. The primary objective of the raid was the capture of Kalabakan, intended as the initial step in a broader offensive. The planned follow-on phases included an advance on Tawau town, continued movement toward Lahad Datu, and ultimately the seizure of Sandakan in the north.

== Geography ==
At the time of the Indonesia–Malaysia Confrontation, Kalabakan, then known as Kampung Kalabakan (Kalabakan Village), was a rural settlement located in the rainforest interior of the Tawau Division, Sabah, Malaysia. The village lay approximately 50 kilometres (31 mi) north-west of Tawau town and about 19 kilometres (12 mi) from the Indonesia–Malaysia border, occupying a strategic position along the Kalabakan River—a vital transportation artery for both civilian and commercial activities.

By the early 1930s, Kalabakan had developed into a significant economic settlement. This growth was primarily attributed to the expansion of rubber, cocoa, tea, oil palm, and hemp plantations, in conjunction with the development of the timber industry. The largest industrial operation within the area was conducted by North Borneo Timbers, a subsidiary of the Bombay Burmah Trading Corporation.

The Kalabakan River served as the primary access route from Tawau, extensively utilising it for industrial transport and the downstream movement of logs to timber processing facilities located within the village. The surrounding area was characterised by hilly terrain and dense jungle, which presented both natural concealment and operational challenges for military activity.

At the time of the Kalabakan raid, the village's defences consisted of a fortified outpost, which concurrently functioned as the local police station. A military outpost had been recently established in the vicinity, approximately 400 yards (370 m) from the police post. This deployment was a direct response to an increase in cross-border incursions, indicating a heightened state of alert during the confrontation.

== Background ==
The Indonesia–Malaysia Confrontation was an armed conflict initiated by the Republic of Indonesia in January 1963, in opposition to the formation of the Federation of Malaysia. Under the leadership of President Sukarno, Indonesia framed Malaysia's creation as a neocolonial construct, allegedly orchestrated by the United Kingdom to preserve Western influence in Southeast Asia. Beyond ideological opposition, the confrontation also reflected Jakarta's longstanding ambition—dating back to the 1950s—to realise a "Greater Indonesia" (Indonesia Raya), encompassing all Malay-speaking territories, including Malaya, Sabah and Sarawak.

In response to escalating tensions, the disused Second World War-era Japanese military base in Tawau was reactivated and repurposed as a defensive stronghold. A combined Malaysian and Commonwealth security force was established, with the East Sabah Brigade assigned responsibility for the defence of East Sabah, including the Tawau Division (then known as Tawau Residency).

For the Tawau Residency, military units deployed to the region included elements from the 10th Gurkha Rifles, the 3rd Battalion, Royal Malay Regiment (3 RMR), the 1st Battalion, King's Own Yorkshire Light Infantry (KOYLI), and the 2nd Regiment Federation Reconnaissance (present-day 2nd Regiment, Royal Armoured Corps). Platoons from these units were strategically distributed to facilitate monitoring and response to potential incursions.

In Kalabakan, a wooden structure on a hill—originally owned by North Borneo Timbers—was offered to the Malaysian authorities for military use. The building was fortified and repurposed as a forward outpost. The 1st Platoon, A Company, 3 RMR, was the first sub-unit assigned to the site, later reinforced by the 10th Platoon, C Company, 3 RMR, to bolster the outpost's defensive capacity.

The Raid on Kalabakan formed a key component of the broader Battle of Tawau. Leading up to the engagement, Indonesian forces conducted an aerial bombardment of Tawau on 7 December 1963, followed by ground infiltration operations. Infiltration elements consisted of elite Commando Operations Corps (Korps Komando Operasi – KKO) personnel—precursors to the present-day Indonesian Marine Corps—as well as communist guerrilla fighters from the North Kalimantan People's Army (NKPA), the armed wing of the North Kalimantan Communist Party.

Infiltration occurred between early and mid-December 1963, with Indonesian forces entering Sabah via Serudong Laut Village and passing through Silimpopon before reaching Kalabakan. Upon arrival in Kalabakan, the force were divided into four detachments, each assigned distinct operational objectives intended to maximise territorial disruption and facilitate a multi-pronged advance:

Detachment	Leader	Objective
N1	Commando Corps (KKO) Second Sergeant (Serda) Rebani aka Benny, (Note: During interrogations conducted by Malaysian–Commonwealth forces and the Special Branch, captured and surrendered members of the Indonesian Detachment 1 identified their leader only by the name "Sergeant Benny") and Hendrik (NKPA)	Advance to Kalabakan
N2	KKO Serda Wayan (Note: At the time, members of the Commando Operations Corps (KKO) had "KKO" included in their official ranks. For example, a KKO First Sergeant would be equivalent to what is known today as a Marines First Sergeant or First Sergeant (Marines).)	Advance toward Tawau
W1	KKO Serda Lasani	Advance toward Sandakan
W2	KKO Serda Subroto	Advance toward Sandakan

=== Indonesian tactical plan for Kalabakan ===
Detachment N1, comprising approximately 45–50 personnel—including 31 KKO commandos and the remainder from the NKPA—was tasked with capturing Kalabakan. The detachment was led by Second Sergeant (Serda) Rebani of the KKO and supported by Hendrik of the NKPA.

To maximise the effectiveness of the assault, Serda Rebani divided his detachment into three assault groups, with orders to surround the Kalabakan military outpost and conduct a night attack under blackout conditions. Each group was assigned a sector of approach:

- Assault Group 1 (Led by KKO Corporal Sukibat): Tasked with moving off the ridge to target the police outpost from the north.
- Assault Group 2 (Led by KKO Second Sergeant Rebani): Tasked with ascending the hill north of the military outpost and moving downhill to target the military outpost from the rear.
- Assault Group 3 (Led by KKO Private Asmat): Tasked with climbing the hill, moving west, and conducting a resupply operation within Kalabakan Village.

Following the capture of Kalabakan, Detachment N1 was to link up with Detachment N2, which had taken up a concealed position near Tawau, to initiate the next phase of operations: the seizure of Tawau, followed by advances on Lahad Datu and Sandakan.

=== Malaysian strategy ===
==== Fortification of Kalabakan ====
Upon deployment to Kalabakan, Malaysian forces undertook immediate steps to fortify their position. Three defensive sandbag forts were constructed around a wooden structure provided by North Borneo Timbers, originally built as accommodation for mill workers. The building was repurposed to serve as a command post and weapons storage facility for both military personnel and North Borneo Timbers. (Note: North Borneo Timbers also employed firearms-trained workers to protect their property from robbers and wild animals.)

The fortified site was designated Kalabakan Base Camp (Kem Kalabakan), strategically positioned facing the Kalabakan River to monitor and defend against potential infiltration by enemy forces approaching via the waterway.

==== Deployment considerations: Serudong Laut Village ====
Shortly before the Kalabakan engagement, the police report regarding an Indonesian raid on a civilian store in Serudong Laut Village reached Captain Zainol Abidin Yaacob, commanding officer of Kalabakan Base Camp.

At the time, Captain Zainol was attending a coordination meeting with local police personnel at his field quarters, located near the Kalabakan Police Station in the centre of the village. Accompanied by his personal aide, Private Ismail Mat, the meeting addressed plans to deploy a military presence to Serudong Laut Village, which lay approximately 2 kilometres (1.2 mi) from the Indonesia–Malaysia border.

Up to that point, Serudong Laut had only been patrolled and defended by the Police Field Force's Border Scouts, with no regular army presence stationed in the area. The proposed deployment aimed to strengthen the frontier's defensive posture in light of escalating cross-border threats.

== Battle ==
According to Mail@Gading Malonti, (Note: Born Gading, he is now Mail. In Malaysia, former names are legally retained, hence the '@' alias.) a member of the Police Field Force who was present during the events, the Indonesian raid on Kalabakan began at approximately 2000 hours on 29 December 1963, shortly after the Isha prayer call. The first indication of the assault was the sound of small-arms fire, followed by a loud explosion emanating from the direction of the Kalabakan Police Station. Believing an incident had occurred at the police post, Captain Zainol Abidin Yaacob, accompanied by his aide, Private Ismail Mat, and Constable Mail, proceeded on foot towards the police station to render assistance.

Unbeknownst to them, the initial gunfire had originated from the direction of the Kalabakan Base Camp, not the police station. While advancing using a torchlight, both Captain Zainol and Private Ismail were ambushed and killed instantly by Indonesian fire. Constable Mail managed to evade incoming rounds and took cover, eventually reaching the Kalabakan Police Station safely by crawling and rolling through cover.

At the time, the police station was staffed by one regular police officer and six Vigilante Corps home guards. Upon hearing the gunfire, the remainder of the station's personnel—eight police officers, including a police corporal commanding officer, and 20 home guards—rapidly mobilised and assembled at the outpost.

Simultaneously, at Kalabakan Base Camp, Second Lieutenant Raja Shaharudin Raja Rome, the second-in-command of the outpost, was on duty and present at the command post with 38 personnel. He reported initially hearing a series of gunshots that appeared to be targeting other areas. Moments later, the base came under intense enemy fire. He immediately moved by crawling into one of the fortified positions but was unable to visually identify the attackers due to complete darkness. The only visible light source in the vicinity was from the base camp itself, which inadvertently illuminated their position and rendered the defenders vulnerable to incoming fire.

The base came under sustained assault, with enemy grenades and possible mortar fire impacting their defences. The lack of visibility made coordinated return fire extremely difficult, and the defenders were largely pinned down throughout the engagement.

Approximately 400 yards (370 m) from the military base, the Kalabakan Police Station faced similar conditions. In response to visible enemy muzzle flashes, the police personnel opened fire in the general direction of the attackers. At approximately 2010 hours, the Indonesian assault intensified on the police outpost. However, owing to its older construction and more robust fortifications, the police station held firm. Despite repeated attempts, the Indonesian forces failed to overrun the police defences.

The firefight continued at both positions until approximately 2300 hours, after which the intensity of enemy fire began to decrease. At that point, Mr Ress, the branch manager of North Borneo Timbers in Kalabakan, arrived at the military base with one of his employees and offered to assist in organising a pursuit party. However, due to heavy casualties and disorganisation among the defenders, no immediate pursuit was undertaken.

While the primary engagement ceased around 2300 hours, sporadic gunfire continued until 0300 hours. It is believed these random shots were intended to discourage pursuit and conceal the withdrawal of Indonesian forces from the Kalabakan area.

== Casualties ==
=== Indonesian side ===
On the Indonesian side, casualties were recorded as one killed in action and three wounded. The fallen Indonesian soldier was killed near the police outpost.

Killed in action (Indonesia)
Rank	Name	Unit
Private (KKO) or Marine (Note: Prajurit KKO was his rank then; it's now Prajurit Marinir (Marines Private/Marine))	Gabriel	1st Bn, Commando Operations Corps

=== Malaysian-Commonwealth side ===
On the Malaysian side, the engagement resulted in eight fatalities and eighteen wounded, all from 3 RMR. Among those killed were Captain Zainol Abidin Yaacob and Private Ismail Mat, who were both shot and killed outside the perimeter of the base while attempting to move toward the source of gunfire.

In addition to military losses, one civilian—an employee of a local estate—was killed and another wounded during the Indonesian withdrawal. The casualties occurred when members of Sergeant Rebani's detachment encountered a Land Rover transporting estate workers returning from logging operations. The vehicle was fired upon by the withdrawing Indonesian forces.

The names of Malaysian military personnel killed and wounded in the action are as follows:

Killed in action (Malaysia)
Rank	Military ID	Name	Notes
Captain	5415	Zainol Abidin Yaacob	The Commanding Officer (CO) of C Company, 3 RMR, concurrently held command of Kalabakan Base Camp. He was posthumously promoted to the rank of Major.
Lance Corporal	13960	Abdullah Abdul Rahman	
Private	11245	Abdul Aziz Abdul Ghani	
Private	11471	Ismail Mat	The Personal Aide to the CO of C Coy, 3 RMR. He was posthumously promoted to the rank of Lance Corporal.
Private	11509	Mohamad Zain Yaacob	
Private	13784	Ismail Mansor	
Private	14447	Yusof Sulong	
Private	14469	Shamsuddin Yasin	

Wounded
Rank	Military ID	Name
Warrant Officer 2nd Class	2380	Awaluddin Kamoi
Sergeant	5237	Ab. Aziz Meon
Lance Corporal	9894	Osman Darus
Lance Corporal	33876	Isa Bujang
Private	9542	Che Amat Che Leh
Private	10277	Abdul Ghani Mohamad
Private	10530	Shukri Suratman
Private	10586	Mohamed Nafiah Yahaya
Private	10587	Mohamad Nor Ahmad
Private	11051	Yaacob Ngah
Private	11164	Mohamad Arfah Almunir
Private	11244	Ariffin Yusof
Private	11957	Abdul Wahab Mat
Private	13885	Yahya Yaacob
Private	14185	Mat Sa'at Yaakob
Private	14346	Ab. Karim Mat Johan
Private	14571	Bidin Abu
Private	14655	Mat Saad Othman

In addition to the officially recorded casualties, Indonesian propaganda alleged that elements of the British Army were stationed alongside 3 RMR, in Kalabakan at the time of the raid. These claims included assertions that three British Army officers were killed during the engagement.

The purported British casualties, as stated in Indonesian broadcasts, are listed as follows:

Rank	Name	Notes
Major	R.M. Haddow or Haddow, RM (Note: Indonesian sources refer to him only as Mayor R.M. Haddow (Major R.M. Haddow), without clarifying whether 'R.M.' is part of his name or Royal Marines.)	A review of casualty records for the Indonesia–Malaysia Confrontation reveals no entries for personnel with the surname Haddow as Killed In Action (KIA).
Major	R.H.D. Norman	Major R.H.D. Norman, serving with 22 SAS, was KIA on 4 May 1963. He died in a helicopter crash while en route to Long Merarap. This incident resulted in a total of nine fatalities.
Major	H.A.I. Thompson	Major H.A.I. Thompson, 22 SAS, was KIA on 4 May 1963. He perished in a helicopter crash en route to Long Merarap. The incident resulted in nine fatalities, including Major Thompson and Major Norman.

These claims, however, were not substantiated by official Malaysian or Commonwealth military records, which reported no British Army personnel present at Kalabakan during the incident.

== Aftermath ==
=== Indonesian side ===
Following the failure to overrun the Kalabakan Police Station, KKO Second Sergeant Rebani ordered Detachment N1 to withdraw and regroup in the nearby jungle. He instructed that wounded personnel be evacuated via the Kalabakan River and returned to Nunukan Island in North Kalimantan, while the uninjured members were directed to proceed overland to link up with Detachment N2, positioned near Tawau town. The detachment moved via the Brantian route, encountering several Malaysian–Commonwealth patrols along the way, during which multiple Indonesian troops were killed.

Sergeant Rebani, who led the original raid on Kalabakan, is believed to have died prior to 7 January 1964. On that date, at approximately 1100 hours, a force of 35 Indonesian personnel, composed of remnants from Detachment N1 and Detachment N2, launched an assault on a Malaysian–Commonwealth cordon established to prevent enemy infiltration into Tawau. The attack was led by KKO Second Sergeant Wayan, suggesting he had assumed overall command of the ground forces following Rebani's presumed death. During the engagement, Wayan and 11 of his men were killed.

By 10 February 1964, out of the approximately 160 Indonesian personnel who had infiltrated Malaysian territory in December 1963, official figures recorded:

- 29 killed in action
- 33 captured
- 22 surrendered

The remaining personnel were presumed to have either successfully retreated to Kalimantan or continued moving north, opting to remain in hiding to avoid detection.

Despite this setback, the Indonesia–Malaysia Confrontation did not end with the Battle of Tawau; hostilities persisted until 1966.

=== Malaysian-Commonwealth side ===
At approximately 0330 hours, a platoon from the 3rd Battalion, Royal Malay Regiment (3 RMR), commanded by Second Lieutenant Wan Nordin Wan Mohammad, arrived at Kalabakan from a nearby outpost. The platoon immediately assisted the surviving defenders and commenced sweep-and-clear patrols to locate any remaining enemy forces around Kalabakan. During these operations, two local civilians suspected of communist sympathies and aiding the Indonesian raiders were detained.

By 0600 hours, with improved daylight visibility, personnel from the Kalabakan Police Station and Vigilante Corps joined the military in securing the area. The remains of the fallen soldiers, previously collected by surviving 3 RMR troops, received further attention, with police and Home Guard elements assisting in recovering remains dispersed by the earlier explosions. During a sweep around the police outpost, the body of one deceased Indonesian soldier was also discovered.

At 1100 hours, a Royal Air Force Westland Whirlwind helicopter from No. 225 Squadron RAF arrived to evacuate the wounded and recover the remains of the fallen. On 3 January, reinforcements from the British Army 10th Gurkha Rifles, including their commanding officer, Lieutenant Colonel E.J.S. Burnett, arrived from Tawau via river transport.

In coordination with surviving elements of 3 RMR, King's Own Yorkshire Light Infantry (KOYLI), and Police Field Force, the Gurkhas initiated search-and-destroy operations in the surrounding region. This action was taken to deny Indonesian forces the opportunity to regroup or launch further assaults on Tawau.

In recognition of their bravery in advancing toward the sound of gunfire despite being in a safer location, Captain Zainol Abidin Yaacob and Private Ismail Mat were posthumously promoted to the ranks of Major and Lance Corporal, respectively.

The bodies of those KIA were transported to Camp Sungai Besi in Kuala Lumpur for military honours before being sent for military burial in their respective hometowns.

== Analysis ==
Outpost design vulnerabilities

The raid on Kalabakan revealed several weaknesses in the layout and design of Malaysian–Commonwealth defensive positions. At the time, military outposts were often constructed using outdated First World War-era principles—typically located on elevated terrain, surrounded by shallow trenches and sandbagged firing positions. Many of these lacked basic defensive features such as perimeter barbed wire, leaving them exposed to infiltration.

The Kalabakan military outpost followed this format, with its defences orientated toward the Kalabakan River in anticipation of a river-based incursion. However, its rear sector was left inadequately secured, a vulnerability that was exploited by Indonesian forces during the attack. By contrast, the adjacent police outpost—established in the 1930s—was more robustly fortified, including wired perimeters, which allowed its defenders to repel the Indonesian assault.

Communication breakdowns

Both Indonesian and Malaysian–Commonwealth forces encountered communication difficulties during the incident. For the Indonesian side, the assault plan required simultaneous attacks on the military and police outposts to maximise the element of surprise. However, the attack on the police outpost was delayed by approximately ten minutes, allowing police and home guard personnel to organise a defence.

On the Malaysian side, reports of an earlier Indonesian raid on Serudong Laut village did not reach Kalabakan in time to place forces on heightened alert. As a result, neither the military nor the police outpost were prepared for the scale of the assault. The delay in intelligence sharing and the limited communication infrastructure of the time were contributing factors to the initial success of the Indonesian raid.

Strategic miscalculations

Malaysian–Commonwealth defensive strategies in Kalabakan placed significant emphasis on securing the waterways, particularly the Kalabakan River, which served as the primary route for transportation and commerce in the region. The surrounding terrain—consisting of swamp and dense tropical rainforest—was believed to be largely inaccessible and therefore a low-priority threat axis.

This assumption proved incorrect. The infiltration by Indonesian commandos and guerrilla fighters demonstrated that the terrain, while difficult, was not impenetrable to small, highly trained units. The lack of adequate ground surveillance and the over-reliance on river defences contributed to the success of the Indonesian infiltration. The raid on Kalabakan illustrated the need for a more comprehensive defence-in-depth strategy that accounted for multiple approaches, not just the most obvious avenues of attack.
