= Battle of Tawau =

Military engagement in Tawau during the Indonesia–Malaysia Confrontation

- Part of Indonesia–Malaysia confrontation
Date	7 December 1963–10 February 1964
Location	Tawau, Sabah, Malaysia 4.276964650116947°N 117.89263019076655°E
Result	Commonwealth victory

Belligerents
Indonesia; Communist Party of Indonesia; North Kalimantan Communist Party	Malaysia; United Kingdom

Commanders and leaders
(Indonesia) Sukarno, President of Indonesia; (Indonesia) Sudomo; (Indonesia) Roesman Noerjadin; Bong Kee Chok	(United Kingdom) Walter Walker, Director of Borneo Operations; (United Kingdom) Jack B.A. Glennie; (United Kingdom) A.C.J.D. McCorkell; (United Kingdom) Edward John Sidney Burnett; (Malaysia) Othman Rani

Units involved
Commando Operations Corps; IV Air Squadron; 11th Air Squadron; 14th Air Squadron; North Kalimantan People's Army	10th Gurkha Rifles; 1st Battalion, King's Own Yorkshire Light Infantry; 3rd Bn, Royal Malays; 2nd Rgt, Federation Recce Corps; (Malaysia) Police Field Force; (Malaysia) Vigilante Corps

Casualties and losses
29 dead, 33 captured and 22 surrendered	Security Forces: 8 dead and 21 wounded; Civilian: 1 dead, 1 wounded and 2 abducted
- Location within Sabah

The Battle of Tawau was a combined air and ground engagement fought between Indonesian and Commonwealth forces in the Tawau Division of Sabah, from 7 December 1963 to 10 February 1964, during the Indonesia–Malaysia Confrontation. The Indonesian objective was to capture Kalabakan as a strategic foothold, thereby facilitating a broader advance to seize the key towns of Tawau, Lahad Datu and Sandakan.

== Geography ==
The Tawau Division is located on the eastern flank of Sabah, bordering the Indonesian province of North Kalimantan along the Malaysia–Indonesia land boundary, which stretches approximately 130 kilometres (81 mi). Additionally, the maritime boundary in the Celebes Sea extends for a further 162 nautical miles (300 km), delineating territorial waters between the two nations.

The division includes the northern portion of Sebatik Island, which has been bisected between Malaysia and Indonesia since the 1915 Boundary Treaty Agreement, making it a critical point of bilateral interest and potential friction.

At the time of the Indonesia–Malaysia Confrontation, Tawau town had an estimated population of 15,000 residents, of whom roughly three-fifths were Indonesian immigrants. The surrounding region consists of tropical rainforests, swamps, coastal zones, and a network of rivers, contributing to its agricultural and commercial significance. During that period, the east coast of Sabah—including Tawau—emerged as one of the most economically advanced regions in the state, largely driven by the cultivation of rubber, cocoa, tea, oil palm, and hemp, as well as a thriving timber industry. The coastal towns of eastern Sabah served as key economic engines for the region.

Tawau's strategic value was first recognised during the Second World War, when Imperial Japanese forces developed it into a military base. Although the base was subsequently abandoned following Japan's surrender in 1945, rising tensions during the Indonesia–Malaysia Confrontation prompted its reactivation in July 1963.

A combined Malaysian and Commonwealth security force was established in response to the threat, with the East Sabah Brigade—under the command of Brigadier Jack Glennie—assigned responsibility for the defence of East Sabah.

To secure the Tawau Residency, multiple military units were deployed to the region, including elements of the 10th Gurkha Rifles, the 3rd Battalion, Royal Malay Regiment (3 RMR), the 1st Battalion, King's Own Yorkshire Light Infantry (1 KOYLI), and the 2nd Regiment, Federation Reconnaissance Corps (now the Royal Armoured Corps). These units operated alongside the Police Field Force and the Vigilante Corps (Malaysia's Home Guard). Platoons from these formations were strategically dispersed throughout the region to monitor key routes and respond rapidly to any incursions by Indonesian forces.

== Background ==
Following the formation of Malaysia in September 1963, the government of Indonesia initiated a campaign of political opposition and military hostility, which escalated into a broader conflict known as the Indonesia–Malaysia Confrontation. The confrontation in East Malaysia was preceded by a series of border incursions, reconnaissance activities, and harassment actions conducted along the Kalimantan–East Malaysia frontier, beginning with the Tebedu Incident in April 1963.

These preliminary operations were designed to destabilise the newly formed Malaysian Federation, undermine local governance, and test the defensive readiness of the Commonwealth and Malaysian security forces stationed in Sabah and Sarawak.

=== Indonesian Strategy ===
Indonesian strategic intent in the Sabah theatre centred on the progressive seizure of key population and logistical centres, beginning with Kalabakan and culminating in the occupation of Tawau and onwards movement toward Sandakan. The campaign was conceived as a phased, land-based advance, supported by irregular warfare and psychological operations (PSYOPS) aimed at destabilising the local population, undermining civil authority, and facilitating insurgent collaboration.

Intelligence gathering and psychological operations

Commencing in early 1963, the Indonesian Armed Forces initiated covert reconnaissance operations within Sabah and Sarawak. Reconnaissance parties, composed of Indonesian special forces operatives in coordination with local communist sympathisers, were inserted to collect topographical, military, and civil intelligence.

According to official British reporting, several reconnaissance elements were apprehended during infiltration attempts as early as April 1963, highlighting pre-conflict intelligence preparations by Indonesian forces.

Forward deployment and irregular warfare support

By October 1963, elements of the 1st Battalion, Commando Operations Corps (Korps Komando Operasi – KKO), (Note: In Bahasa Indonesia, the word "Komando" can refer either to "Commando"—an elite light infantry unit—or to a military command structure. In the case of Korps Komando Operasi, it refers to the former meaning: an elite commando unit.) operating as a precursor to the modern Indonesian Marine Corps, were forward-deployed from Surabaya to positions on the Indonesian side of Sebatik Island, adjacent to the international boundary.

A permanent base and training facility were established to support irregular warfare activities. These included the training, arming, and logistical support of North Kalimantan People's Army (NKPA) cadres and pro-Indonesian civilians from surrounding border settlements. This force constituted the nucleus of an irregular guerrilla network intended to complement conventional operations and conduct subversive actions within Malaysian territory.

Cross-border activity from these forward positions included regular harassment fire, reconnaissance-in-force missions, and the systematic mapping of Malaysian and Commonwealth defensive dispositions. Intelligence gathered was transmitted to Indonesian higher command to inform subsequent operational planning.

Aerial operations and preliminary bombardment

In support of the planned ground offensive and in an effort to secure local air superiority, the Indonesian Air Force deployed elements from the 4th, 11th, and 14th Air Squadrons to conduct aerial bombardment, escort, and deception operations. These missions targeted key military and logistical infrastructure in and around Tawau, with two primary objectives:

1. To degrade the combat effectiveness of Malaysian and Commonwealth forward units.
2. To serve as a diversionary measure to obscure the infiltration of Indonesian ground elements across the border.

This aerial component was designed to disorient Commonwealth command-and-control structures and force the redeployment of Malaysian assets away from intended infiltration corridors.

Indonesian Air Assets Assigned:

- 4th Air Squadron – North American B-25 Mitchell medium bombers
- 11th Air Squadron – North American P-51D Mustang fighter aircraft
- 14th Air Squadron – Tupolev Tu-16KS-1 strategic bombers

These squadrons operated in coordination to execute precision strikes, provide fighter escort where necessary, and simulate broader offensive intent to mislead Commonwealth intelligence assessments and battlefield response.

Ground infiltration and main force advance

Indonesian main force elements were tasked with simultaneous multi-axis penetration of Sabah via two primary ingress routes:

- Eastern Axis: Via the Serudong River, with forces entering the Tawau District.
- Western Axis: Via the Tumalasak River near Nabawan District.

On the eastern axis, Indonesian ground forces comprised approximately 160 personnel, drawn from the Commando Operations Corps (KKO) and the North Kalimantan People's Army (NKPA), also known as the North Borneo Liberation Army. The primary objective of the eastern thrust was the capture of Tawau and Lahad Datu, to be followed by a continued advance northward toward Sandakan. Upon securing Sandakan, the plan called for Indonesian forces to consolidate their positions and await further operational directives from Jakarta.

This strategy reflected a phased escalation model, with subsequent actions contingent upon battlefield outcomes and local tactical conditions. The approach relied heavily on speed, local Sabahan support, and the disruption of Malaysian–Commonwealth defensive cohesion to achieve its strategic objectives.

Logistical considerations

Indonesian forces will brought military equipment from Kalimantan together with few days worth of food. During their operations inside Sabah, they were expected to get food help from anti-colonial resistance and pro-communist locals. They also expected to established logistical lines at Sabah east coast after liberating Tawau, Lahad Datu and Sandakan.

== Battle ==
Initial Indonesian action: Aerial bombardment phase

The engagement commenced on 7 December 1963 with aerial bombardment sorties conducted by the 14th Air Squadron of the Indonesian Air Force, utilising a Tupolev Tu-16KS-1 strategic bomber. The target of this initial strike was the town of Tawau, with the operational objective of disrupting Malaysian and Commonwealth defensive positions and facilitating the covert insertion of Indonesian ground forces.

A second aerial assault took place on 28 December 1963, this time executed by a B-25 Mitchell bomber of the 4th Air Squadron, escorted by two P-51D Mustang fighters from the 11th Air Squadron. The mission was part of a broader Indonesian strategy to degrade local command-and-control infrastructure and apply psychological pressure on defending forces.

Despite the intensity of these air raids, the bombings failed to strike any significant military targets. Instead, they caused damage to civilian structures in Tawau, though no casualties were reported on the Malaysian side. (Note: Although damage in Tawau from the aerial bombardment was recorded, there were no official reports of civilian casualties from local government authorities. It is possible that citizens did not report the casualties to the police or that police reports never reached Borneo Operations HQ.) The aerial campaign, although limited in tactical effect, functioned as both a psychological warfare measure and a diversionary tactic to obscure the ongoing infiltration of Indonesian forces across the border.

Ground infiltration and movement to contact

Intelligence reports and recovered materials indicate that Indonesian ground elements likely entered Sabah between early and mid-December 1963. On 12 December, a Border Scouts patrol discovered abandoned enemy military equipment along the Tumalasak River, including:

- A metal container with 50 mm mortar rounds
- Three empty containers for .303 calibre ammunition
- Three pairs of Indonesian Armed Forces-issue boots
- Miscellaneous field items

On 20 December, a civilian report was received of a raid on a shop in Serudong Laut village by an armed group of approximately 10 personnel in green jungle uniforms bearing white insignia. The raiders abducted two Murut civilians, stole a radio set, and confiscated food supplies.

Subsequently, the enemy moved through Silimpopon, where gunfire was reported by local lumber workers—later attributed to wild boar hunting by Indonesian troops. The same elements bivouacked at a lumber camp near Kalabakan and then reorganised into four assault groups, as follows:

Detachment	Strength	Leader	Objective
N1	~50	Second Sergeant (Serda) Commando Corps (KKO) Rebani "Benny" and Hendrik (NKPA)	Advance to Kalabakan
N2	37	Serda KKO Wayan	Advance toward Tawau
W1	34	Serda KKO Lasani	Advance toward Sandakan
W2	30	Serda KKO Subroto	Advance toward Sandakan

Kalabakan Incident

At 1900 hours on 29 December 1963, Detachment N1, under the command of Sergeant Rebani launched a coordinated surprise assault on a Commonwealth defensive outpost located approximately 19 kilometres (12 mi) from the Indonesian-Malaysian border, near Kalabakan. (Note: Second Sergeant (Serda) Rebani was also identified as "Sergeant Benny" by surrendered and captured Indonesian forces during interrogation by Commonwealth troops.) The position was held by 1st Platoon, A Company, 3rd Battalion, Royal Malay Regiment (3 RMR).

The assault commenced with indirect fire, believed to be delivered by mortars or hand-thrown grenades, followed by a sustained small arms engagement. The firefight resulted in eight fatalities, including one officer, and eighteen personnel wounded, all from 3 RMR. Additionally, one civilian was killed and another seriously wounded during the exchange.

Upon hearing the attack, Border Scouts of the Police Field Force, along with local Vigilante Corps elements stationed at a nearby police outpost, opened fire in the direction of visible muzzle flashes. Shortly thereafter, their own position came under direct assault by Indonesian forces. Despite heavy resistance, the defenders maintained their position throughout the night. (Note: At that time, Kalabakan had two security force outposts—one manned by the 3rd Battalion of the Royal Malay Regiment (3 RMR) and the other by a platoon from the Police Field Force.)

The intensity of the firefight gradually diminished around 2300 hours, after the Indonesian attackers were unable to breach the police outpost's defences, forcing them to withdraw into the surrounding jungle. Sporadic fire continued until approximately 0300 hours, after which the area fell silent.

At first light, Border Scouts and Vigilante Corps personnel moved to the military outpost to provide reinforcements, assist in the treatment of casualties, and recover the bodies of the fallen. During a sweep of the vicinity, police personnel discovered the body of a deceased Indonesian combatant near their outpost, indicating the proximity and intensity of the engagement. Indonesian forces also sustained three wounded in the engagement.

This engagement is referred to in Malaysia as Peristiwa Kalabakan (the Kalabakan Incident), while in Indonesia, it is known as the Raid on Kalabakan.

Recovery and reinforcement

Following the withdrawal of Indonesian forces into the surrounding jungle, casualty evacuation (CASEVAC) operations commenced at 1100 hours on 30 December 1963, with rotary-wing support deployed to extract the wounded and deceased personnel from the Kalabakan outpost to Tawau.

Elements of Detachment N1 that remained unwounded regrouped and proceeded toward Brantian, guided by the abducted Murut civilians taken during the earlier raid at Serudong Laut village. Simultaneously, the wounded personnel attempted to exfiltrate to Nunukan Island via the Kalabakan River using perahu. However, this group was intercepted by Commonwealth forces, prompting the Indonesian troops to abandon their craft and flee into the river. Their subsequent fate remains unknown, but the capture of the abandoned perahu yielded valuable intelligence documents, which provided insight into Indonesian operational planning and unit dispositions.

At approximately 0330 hours, a platoon from the 3rd Battalion, Royal Malay Regiment (3 RMR), under the command of Second Lieutenant Wan Nordin Wan Mohammad, arrived in Kalabakan from a nearby outpost. The unit immediately reinforced the surviving defenders and initiated sweep-and-clear patrols to search for remaining enemy elements. During the operation, two local civilians were detained on suspicion of communist sympathies and aiding the Indonesian raiders.

On 3 January 1964, the 10th Gurkha Rifles—commanded by Lieutenant Colonel Edward John Sidney Burnett—deployed from Tawau to Kalabakan. The battalion coordinated with 3 RMR, the 1st Battalion, King's Own Yorkshire Light Infantry (1 KOYLI), and police forces to conduct search-and-destroy operations throughout the operational area. Exploiting intelligence recovered from the intercepted perahu, Malaysian–Commonwealth forces effectively disrupted Indonesian troop movements and severed their logistics chains, resulting in critical shortages of food and essential supplies for infiltrating enemy units.

Counter-Offensive and Indonesian losses

On 7 January 1964, a force identified as Detachment N2, led by Sergeant Wayan and assigned the objective of seizing Tawau, attempted to breach the Malaysian–Commonwealth defensive cordon established to prevent Indonesian forces from advancing toward the town. In the ensuing engagement, 11 Indonesian personnel were killed, and one was seriously wounded, while the remaining members of the detachment managed to disengage and retreat.

Among the dead was an individual wearing an identification disc marked KKO AL NRP 623800, later assumed to be Sergeant Wayan. On his body were operational documents dated 4 January 1964, outlining movement orders, encrypted passcode and tactical instructions from higher Indonesian command.

By 12 January 1964, combined Malaysian and Commonwealth operations inflicted significant losses on the infiltrating Indonesian elements:

- 22 enemy personnel killed
- Multiple captures during follow-on clearance operations

Despite these setbacks, surviving Indonesian elements attempted to regroup and resume their advance toward Tawau. On 28 January 1964, a hostile group was intercepted and ambushed at Merotai Estate, approximately 19 kilometres (12 mi) from Tawau. The ambush, conducted by 6th Platoon, C Company, 3 RMR, was successful and effectively neutralised the enemy force, halting further movement along that axis.

Conclusion of Operations

The conflict in the Tawau District AO formally concluded on 10 February 1964, when surviving Indonesian personnel surrendered to Malaysian and Commonwealth forces. This surrender marked the termination of the first major phase of Indonesian incursions during the Indonesia–Malaysia Confrontation in Sabah.

== Casualties ==
Casualties sustained by Malaysian and Commonwealth forces during the campaign were moderate in military terms, though significant in the context of the Kalabakan engagement. A total of eight Malaysian military personnel, including one officer, were killed in action, with a further twenty one wounded. The majority of these casualties were incurred by the 3rd Battalion, Royal Malay Regiment, during the Kalabakan Incident. An additional three personnel from the 10th Gurkha Rifles were wounded during subsequent search-and-destroy operations.

Civilian casualties were minimal. One civilian was confirmed killed and one was wounded, both during the Kalabakan Incident. There are no verified reports of civilian casualties resulting from the Indonesian aerial bombardment of Tawau.

On the Indonesian side, 29 personnel were confirmed killed in action, while 33 were captured and 22 surrendered to Malaysian or Commonwealth forces. A number of Indonesian troops remain unaccounted for and are presumed to have successfully withdrawn across the border into North Kalimantan.

== Aftermath ==
From the Indonesian perspective, the Battle of Tawau and the Kalabakan raid were exploited as propaganda tools by the Indonesian government to bolster domestic support for its campaign to annex East Malaysia. Official Indonesian broadcasts falsely claimed the killing of three British Army officers during the Kalabakan raid, portraying the engagement as proof that "white soldiers were not invincible" and could be defeated. This narrative was used to rally support for continued hostilities and justify further incursions into Sabah and Sarawak.

In the months following the Battle of Tawau, sporadic skirmishes continued along the Sabah-Kalimantan border. The most serious of these occurred on 28 June 1965, when a large Indonesian force—comprising elements from the Commando Operations Corps (KKO) based on the Indonesian side of Sebatik Island, supported by additional units from Nunukan Island—launched a frontal cross-border assault on Wallace Bay, the site of a Commonwealth military outpost. The attack was ultimately repelled, assisted by naval gunfire from HMAS Yarra, which conducted harassing bombardments during the enemy withdrawal.

Subsequent attempts to breach Malaysian lines occurred on 5 July and 10 July 1965. Both incursions were similarly disrupted and halted by HMAS Yarra's continued naval bombardments in support of ground forces.

There is also evidence to suggest that Indonesian infiltration extended beyond the border zone. On 23 April 1964, an unidentified A-26 Invader bomber dropped 22 parachute crates containing military equipment—including mortar rounds, grenades, and medical supplies—northeast of Jesselton (modern-day Kota Kinabalu). The drop site was secured by Malaysian–Commonwealth forces, and no Indonesian operatives arrived to retrieve the materials, indicating a failed or aborted infiltration attempt.

On the Malaysian–Commonwealth side, the engagements at Tawau and Kalabakan highlighted shortcomings in local defensive strength and the need for increased military presence. In response, additional Commonwealth ground forces were deployed to the area, including the 4th Battalion, Royal Australian Regiment (4 RAR) and the 1st Battalion, Royal New Zealand Infantry Regiment (1 RNZIR).

In September 1964, Operation Khas was launched, involving the deployment of Commonwealth special forces and commando units to the Tawau sector. Their mission was to detect, prevent, and neutralise cross-border guerrilla incursions by Indonesian commandos. To strengthen maritime security, at least one Commonwealth naval vessel was maintained on a rotational but continuous presence near Wallace Bay, providing naval gunfire support and coastal surveillance.

== Analysis ==
The primary factor contributing to the Indonesian defeat at the Battle of Tawau was attrition. Indonesian forces were unable to establish a reliable logistics chain and faced critical shortages in food and ammunition. This logistical failure was largely due to the lack of support from the local population in Sabah. Contrary to Indonesian government propaganda at the time—which portrayed the people of East Malaysia as hostile to the formation of Malaysia and welcoming of Indonesian forces as "liberators"—the reality on the ground was markedly different. Upon entry, Indonesian troops were generally viewed by the local populace as foreign invaders, not liberators. This widespread lack of local cooperation severely hampered Indonesian operational sustainability.

The propaganda narratives promoted during the Indonesia–Malaysia Confrontation remain prevalent in Indonesian public discourse to this day. The Battle of Tawau and the broader conflict continue to be portrayed in Indonesian national education curricula as part of a nationalist framework. Despite the widespread availability of historical data and primary sources in the digital era, many of these outdated narratives have persisted unchallenged, having been reproduced over decades without thorough verification. A growing number of Indonesian scholars have begun to critically reassess this period; however, such academic efforts remain gradual and limited in reach.

Although it is acknowledged that propaganda elements may have existed on the Malaysia–Commonwealth side, independent research suggests a high degree of consistency in official reporting. A 2018 study by the University of Malaya found that Malaysian and Commonwealth records pertaining to the confrontation were factually consistent and aligned with operational realities. In addition, declassified intelligence reports released in 1999—originating from CIA agents stationed in Southeast Asia, as well as communications from the United States Embassy in Djakarta (present-day Jakarta) to the U.S. Department of State—corroborated the Malaysian–Commonwealth account of events. Collectively, these findings indicate that the historical record from the Malaysian–Commonwealth perspective is supported by independent international intelligence assessments of the period.
