= Kalabakan District =

District in Sabah, Malaysia

Kalabakan
- District
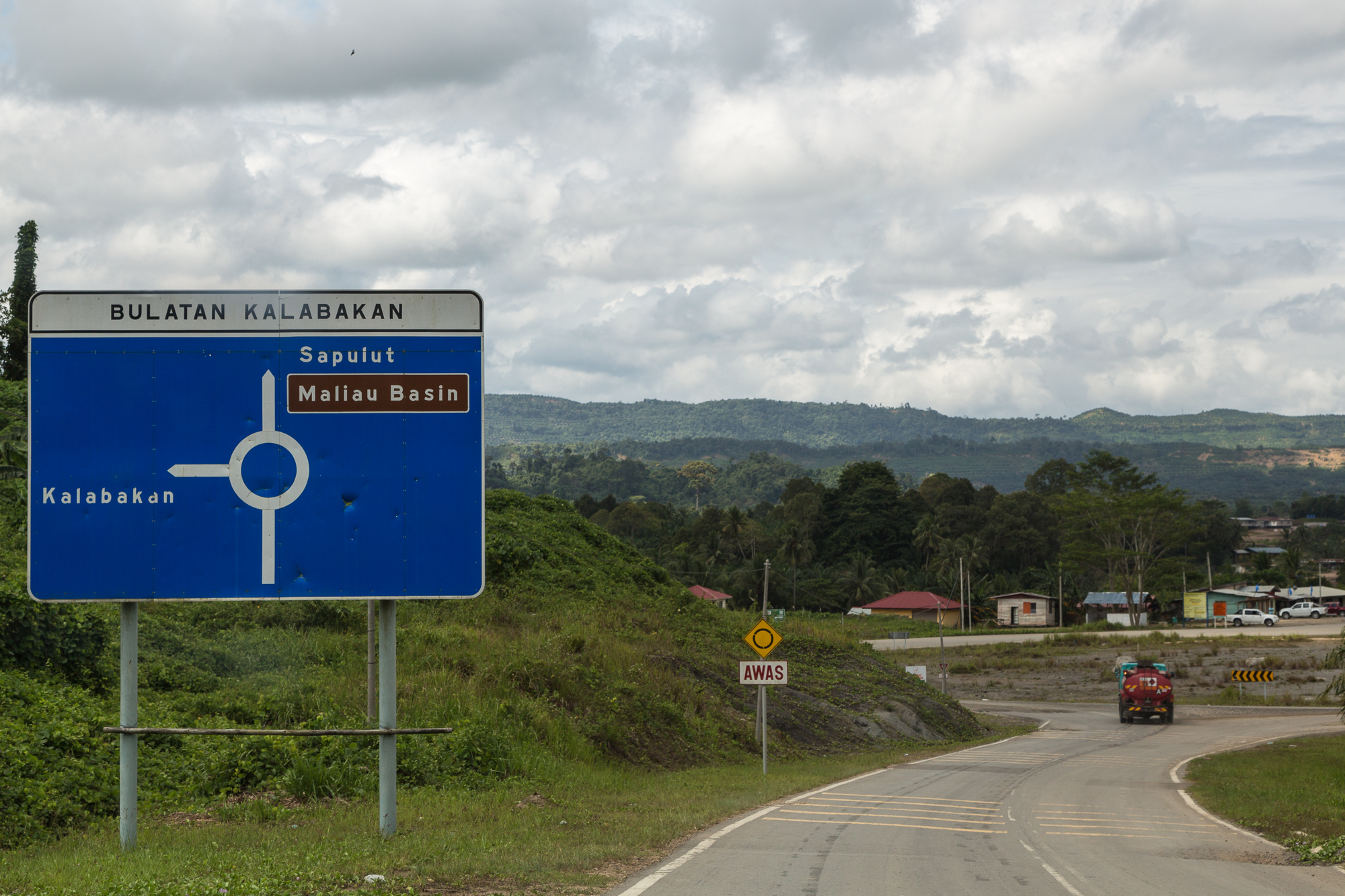
- Roundabout on the Tawau–Kalabakan Road at Kalabakan

- Map of divisions and districts of Sabah: Kalabakan is labelled 28
- Coordinates: 4°25′N 117°29′E
- Country: Malaysia
- State: Sabah
- Established: 1 January 2019
- Capital: Kalabakan

Government
  - District Officer: Rashid Abdul Harun

Area
  - Total: 3,885 km^{2} (1,500 sq mi)

Population (2020)
  - Total: 48,195
  - Density: 12.41/km^{2} (32.13/sq mi)
- Time zone: UTC+8 (MST)
- Website: pdkalabakan.sbh.gov.my

Kalabakan is an administrative district (Malay: daerah) in the Malaysian state of Sabah, part of the Tawau Division, located approximately 235 kilometres (146 mi) southeast of the state capital of Kota Kinabalu. It recorded a population of 48,195 people in the 2020 Malaysian census. Its capital is the town of Kalabakan.

== Geography ==
Kalabakan borders the Sabahan districts of Nabawan to the west, Tongod to the north, Lahad Datu and Kunak to the northeast, and Tawau to the east. To the south, it borders Nunukan Regency in the Indonesian province of North Kalimantan. To the southeast, it is bounded by Cowie Bay, an arm of the Celebes Sea, and Wallace Bay, a channel that separates Kalabakan from the western coast of Sebatik Island. Kalabakan covers an area of 3,885 square kilometres (1,500 sq mi) and comprises 5.28% of the state's area.

The interior of Kalabakan features rugged terrain in the Kuamut Highlands to the west and the Tawau Highlands to the northeast, separated by the lower relief of the Kalabakan Valley in between. The largest forest reserve in the district is Sungai Tiagau, which covers 26,880 hectares (66,400 acres) in the Kuamut Highlands and serves as a buffer zone for the Maliau Basin reserve to its west. Several rivers including the Serudong, Kalabakan and Brantian flow from the highlands into Cowie Bay, which is fringed with mangrove swamps. Human–wildlife conflict in the area includes the poaching of Borneo elephants and crocodile attacks.

Kalabakan has a tropical rainforest climate. Mean annual rainfall is about 2,100 millimetres (83 in) and peaks in June and October.

== History ==
The place name Kalabakan is of Tidong origin, meaning "can eat". The indigenous inhabitants of the area are the Murut and Tidong people.

From 1905 to 1932, the London-based Cowie Harbour Coal Company operated a coal mine at Silimpopon. Chinese coolie labourers made up a majority of the mine's workforce, which numbered more than 3000 at its height and produced 1.5 million tons of coal over the mine's lifetime. The coal was transported by rail and barge to Sebatik Island, where it was loaded on ocean-going vessels for export.

During the Indonesia–Malaysia confrontation, Kalabakan was raided by Indonesian forces on 29 December 1963.

Kalabakan was administered as part of Tawau District until 1 January 2019, when it was established as an independent district. Prior to the split, Tawau District had been as large as the state of Negeri Sembilan. The Sabah government divided it into two districts with the aim of improving its administration and development. The current district officer is Rashid bin Abdul Harun.

== Economy and infrastructure ==
Major economic activities in Kalabakan include farming of oil palm and local fruits, and shrimp fishing. Sabah Softwoods Bhd. owns over 60,000 hectares (150,000 acres) of timber and oil palm plantations in the district.

Paved roads connect Kalabakan with Tawau to the east and Sapulut and Keningau to the west. In March 2021, Sabah announced it was proceeding with plans to build a border crossing between Serudong in Kalabakan District and Simanggaris in North Kalimantan, which would be part of the larger Pan-Borneo Highway. As well as the highway, plans were announced in 2020 to construct a new customs and immigration centre to better facilitate cross-border trade. Development of the border area, including the creation of the new district, is in part prompted by the planned relocation of Indonesia's capital to Nusantara.
