= Zollingeria borneensis =

Conservation status
- Data Deficient (IUCN 3.1)

Scientific classification
- Kingdom: Plantae
- Clade: Tracheophytes
- Clade: Angiosperms
- Clade: Eudicots
- Clade: Rosids
- Order: Sapindales
- Family: Sapindaceae
- Genus: Zollingeria
- Species: Z. borneensis

Binomial name
- Zollingeria borneensis Adema

Species of tree

Zollingeria borneensis is a species of plant in the family Sapindaceae. It is endemic to Borneo, and is threatened by habitat loss.

Zollingeria borneensis is a tree that can grow up to 60 meters tall and typically flowers in February.

This species has been recorded in Lahad Datu District on Sabah's east coast and Tawau District on Sabah's southeast coast. It grows in primary lowland rain forests at elevations up to 30 metres.
