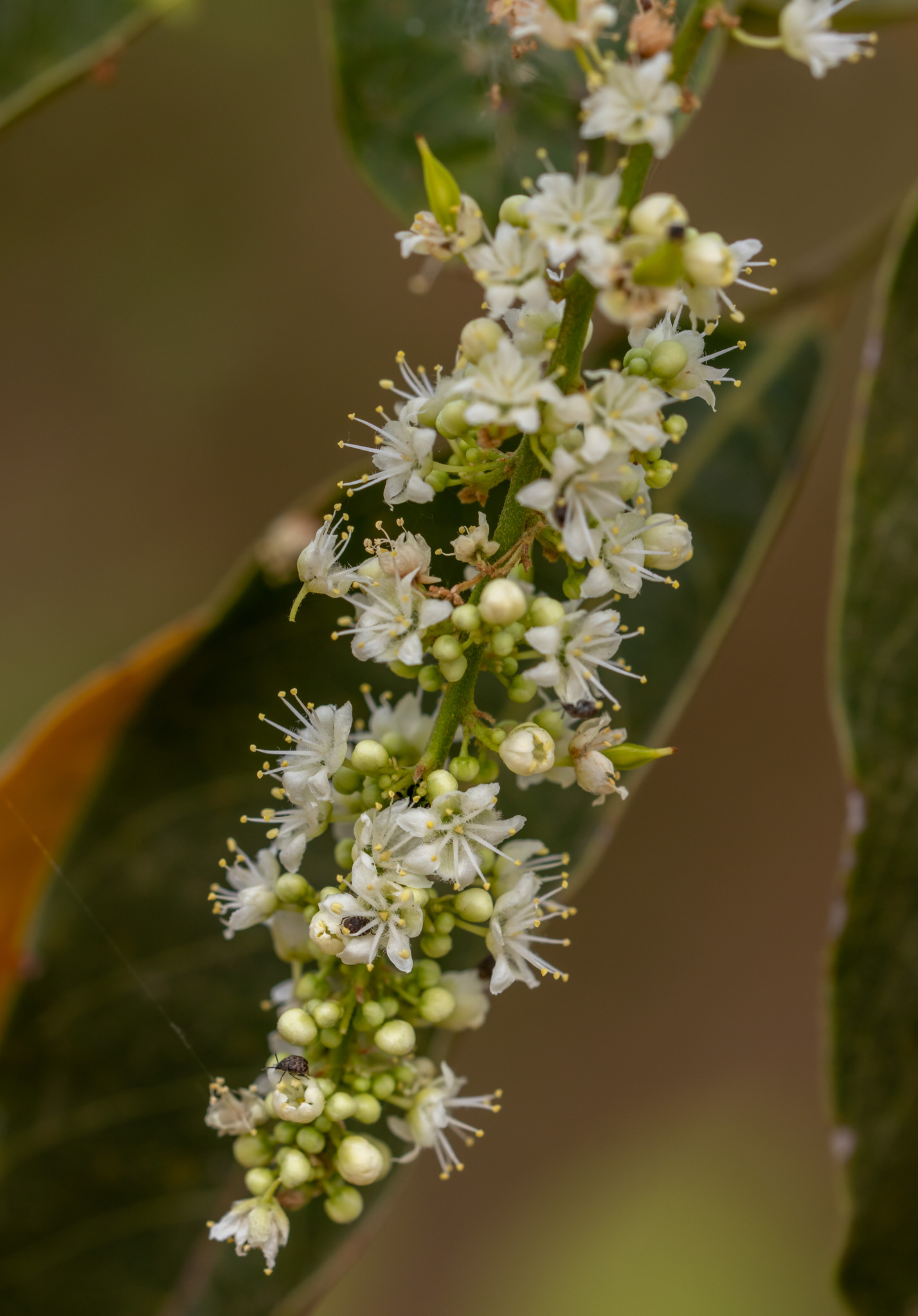
- In Nakhon Sawan, Thailand

Conservation status
- Data Deficient (IUCN 2.3)

Scientific classification
- Kingdom: Plantae
- Clade: Tracheophytes
- Clade: Angiosperms
- Clade: Eudicots
- Clade: Rosids
- Order: Sapindales
- Family: Sapindaceae
- Genus: Zollingeria
- Species: Z. dongnaiensis

Binomial name
- Zollingeria dongnaiensis Pierre

= Zollingeria dongnaiensis =

Species of flowering plant

Zollingeria dongnaiensis is a species of plant in the family Sapindaceae. It is considered medicinal, and is easy to germinate. It is used in soaps, shampoos, and cosmetics. It is found in Thailand and Vietnam.
