= Combat operations in 1963 during the Indonesia–Malaysia confrontation =

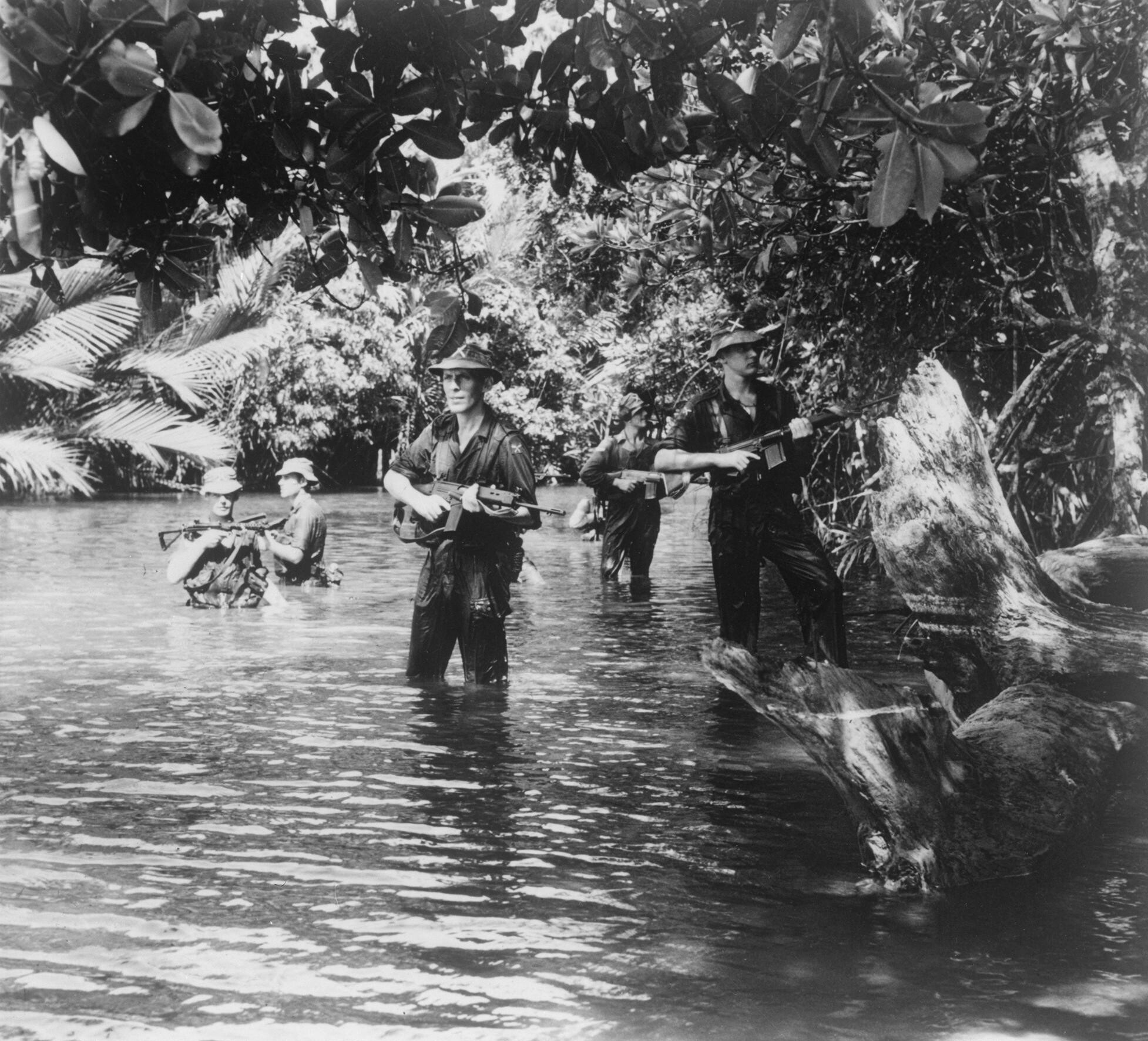
Troops from the 1st Battalion, Queen's Own Highlanders, conduct a patrol to search for enemies position in the jungle of Brunei, September 1963.

In April 1963, the first recorded infiltration and attack occurred in Borneo as part of the wider Indonesia–Malaysia confrontation. An infiltration force training at Nangabadan was split in two and prepared for its first operation.

== Combat operations in 1963 ==
=== Battle of Tebedu ===
In April 1963, the first recorded infiltration and attack occurred in Borneo. An infiltration force training at Nangabadan was split in two and prepared for its first operation. On 12 April 1963, one infiltration force attacked and seized the police station at Tebedu in the 1st Division of Sarawak, about 40 miles from Kuching and 2 miles from the border with Kalimantan.

=== Battle of Gumbang ===
The other group attacked the village of Gumbang, South West of Kuching, later in the month. Only about half returned. Confrontation could be said to have started from a military perspective with the Tebedu attack. For the next five months, the Chinese guerrillas undertook further raids, typically attacks on longhouses. In June, an operation by about 15 was dealt with. In this period, it was a platoon commander's war for the British. Platoons deployed individually in semi-permanent patrol bases, initially in villages but then outside them to reduce the risk to inhabitants in event of an Indonesian attack. Helicopter landing sites were cleared a few kilometres apart all along the border area, and platoons patrolled vigorously. Small parties of Gurkhas, police and Border Scouts were stationed in many remote villages.

=== Battle of Long Jawai ===
The Battle of Long Jawai was the first major incursion for the centre of the 3rd Division, directed by an RPKAD Lieutenant Mulyono Soerjowardojo, who had been sent to Nangabadan earlier in the year. Up to 200 guerillas with 300 porters and longboats moved to Long Jawi, some 50 miles from the border and with a population of about 500. It was a junction for river and track communications. The British outpost in the village was in the process of establishing a new position on a nearby hill, but their communications remained in the village school. The total British force was 6 Gurkhas, 3 Police Field Force and 21 Border Scouts, with a handful in the school and the remainder in the new position.

The lost communications meant that it took two days for news to reach the HQ 1/2 Gurkhas, but reaction was swift and the entire Royal Navy Wessex helicopter force was made available. Helicopters enabled the Gurkhas to deploy ambush parties to likely withdrawal routes in orchestrated action that lasted until the end of October. The tortured bodies of 7 Border Scouts were found. In the ensuing confrontations, 33 Indonesians are known to have been killed, 26 in a boat ambush on 1 October.

The failure of the Border Scouts to detect the incursion, particularly since the Indonesians were in Long Jawi for two days before the attack, led to a change of role. Instead of being paramilitary, they concentrated on gathering intelligence. The situation also emphasised the need for the "hearts and minds" campaign.

== Changes in Commonwealth deployments ==
The creation of Malaysia meant that Malaysian Army units deployed to Borneo (now East Malaysia). 3rd Battalion Royal Malay Regiment (RMR) went to Tawau in Sabah, and the 5th to the 1st Division of Sarawak. The Tawau area also had a company of the King's Own Yorkshire Light Infantry. Brigadier Glennie, who was directly responsible for the East Brigade area, had recognised the risks in the area. The RN guardship made a seaborne attack unlikely, but the myriad creeks and rivers around Tawau, Cowie Harbour and Wallace Bay were a challenge. He organised an ad hoc waterborne force that became the Tawau Assault Group (TAG). Formation of Malaysia led to increased Indonesian action. Elite military units were ordered to the border; the army was in West Kalimantan, and the (Korps Komando Operasi – KKO) were responsible for the east.

=== Ambush At Sabah ===
The KKO were opposite Tawau on the Indonesian half of Sebatik Island. This force consisted of five companies as well as a training camp for volunteers. On 17 October, five KKO and one TNKU dressed in civilian clothes crossed into Sabah and burnt down a village; the KKO officer was killed.

One of 3 RMR's positions was at Kalabakan west of Tawau. There was a fortified police station, and 400 yards away in 2 unfortified huts (with some adjacent fighting trenches) were some 50 RMR soldiers with their company commander. In late December, a force of 35 KKO regulars and 128 volunteers (Pocock) or 11 and 36 (Conboy) crossed into Sabah and remained in the swampland undetected for 8 days. The mission was to capture Kalabakan and then move on Tawau with Indonesian expatriates rising to join them.

=== Raid on Kalabakan ===
At 11:00 pm on 29 December, the 3rd RMR position had been taken by surprise, with 8 killed, including the commander Captain Zainol Yaacob, and 19 wounded. An attack shortly after on the police station failed. The attackers moved north instead of east to liberate Tawau. Gurkhas were flown in, and the fighting was over after a month. Two-thirds of the KKO participants were killed or captured and admitted that they had expected the population to rise and greet them as liberators.

TAG became properly established based on an infantry company, marines and a Naval Gunfire Observation Party from a battery in Hong Kong. They dominated the area, and included a raft-mounted mortar. One of their 'posts' was a boat permanently positioned close to the international border across Wallace Bay. A minesweeper was usually part of TAG because there were no other naval patrol boats suitable for coastal use. In the West, the RPKAD Battalion 2 sent two companies, one parachuted into Nangabadan while the other dropped further west to Senaning. Their task was to patrol the border, not cross it. Cross-border operations were assigned to 328 Raider Battalion, who arrived in October, working with TNKU remnants and disguising themselves as TNKU. In November, they started shallow raids, but these were barely noticed; another company from RPKAD Battalion 2 was sent, to be disguised as TNKU.

=== Bombing of Tawau ===
In October 1963, Indonesia moved their first battalion of the Korps Komando Operasi (KKO) from Surabaya to Sebatik and opened several training camps near the border in eastern Kalimantan (now North Kalimantan). From 1 October to 16 December 1963, there were at least seven shootings along the border resulting in three Indonesians' deaths. On 7 December 1963, an Indonesian Tupolev Tu-16 bomber flew over Tawau bay and bombed the town twice.

=== Battle of Kampung Pareh ===
On October 4, 1963, 41 Kostrad soldiers landed in Kampung Pareh, Malaysia. Unaware that the village was guarded by the Royal Malay Regiment and British SAS, the Kostrad forces, led by Sergeant Major M. Darto, launched a swift assault. The attack succeeded, with Kostrad forces eliminating 25 British and Malay soldiers, though they lost 2 of their own.

=== Attack on Kuching ===
In late December, the company embarked on an attack on Kuching; however, most balked at the border and only 20 men crossed it on 1 January 1964. They soon met up with a Royal Marine patrol, suffering 2 killed. They also killed a marine, took his ID card, and booby-trapped his abandoned body. Nevertheless, the company was withdrawn to Java in some disgrace, having failed to match the KKO's success at Kalabakan. Cpl. Marriot RM's body was recovered the next day and flown to Kuching from Bau by helicopter.
