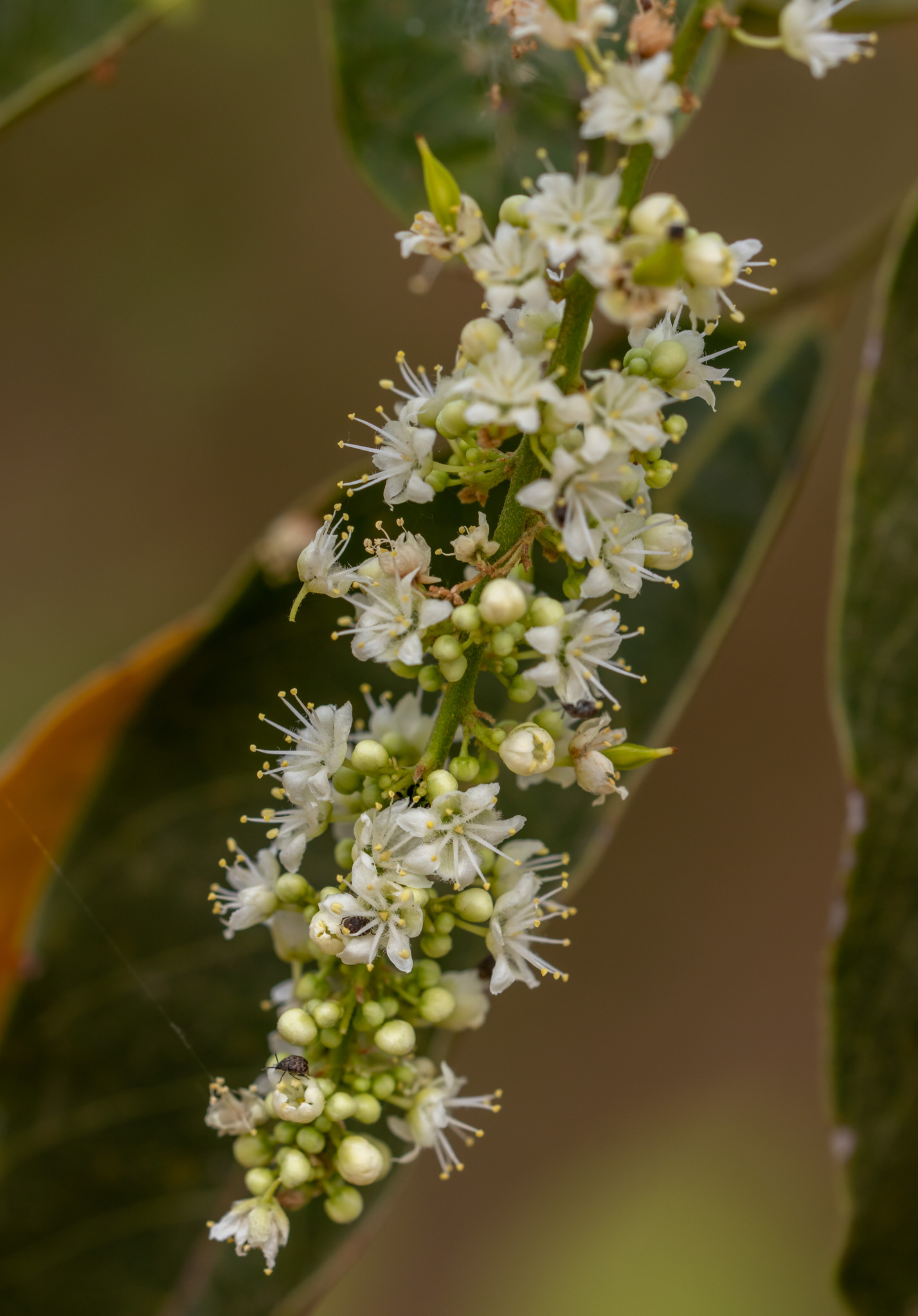
- Zollingeria dongnaiensis

Scientific classification
- Kingdom: Plantae
- Clade: Tracheophytes
- Clade: Angiosperms
- Clade: Eudicots
- Clade: Rosids
- Order: Sapindales
- Family: Sapindaceae
- Subfamily: Sapindoideae
- Genus: Zollingeria; Kurz

Species
- See text

= Zollingeria =

Genus of flowering plants

Zollingeria is a genus of plants in the family Sapindaceae.

Species include:

- Zollingeria borneensis Adema
- Zollingeria dongnaiensis Pierre
- Zollingeria laotica Gagnep.
- Zollingeria macrocarpa Kurz
