= Battle of Long Jawai =

Indonesian attack on Long Jawai outpost

- Part of the Indonesia–Malaysia confrontation
Date	28 September – 10 October 1963
Location	Long Jawai, Borneo
Result	Commonwealth victory

Belligerents
Indonesia	United Kingdom; Malaysia

Commanders and leaders
(Indonesia) Benny Moerdani	(United Kingdom) John Burlinson (United Kingdom) Tejbahadur Gurung

Strength
200 soldiers 300 porters	United Kingdom: 6 Gurkhas; Malaysia: 2 police officers 21 border scouts

Casualties and losses
~33 deaths: 5 people died 26 Indonesian fighters were killed	13 killed (10 executed); 2 wounded 10 captured

The Battle of Long Jawai (Indonesian: Pertempuran Long Jawai or Pertempuran Jawi Panjang) was one of the earliest battles of the Indonesia–Malaysia confrontation, and one of the battle that fought the third Sarawak division by some indonesian perpetrators.

A large Indonesian contingent crossed the border and attacked the outpost at Long Jawai, about fifty miles into Borneo. A small mixed military and paramilitary force was defeated by the Indonesians but British Gurkha reinforcements were put into the jungle between the area and Indonesian Borneo. In a number of ambushes some of the withdrawing Indonesian force were killed.

== Background ==
On 25 September 1963, Captain John Burlinson arrived at the village of Long Jawai, population of 500, and began setting up defences. His forces consisted of six Gurkhas led by Corporal Tejbahadur Gurung, two Police Field Force officers, and 21 local (paramilitary) Malaysian Border Scouts. However, an Indonesian reconnaissance party had been hiding in one of the village longhouses and was soon reinforced by a full-scale raiding party. The Gurkhas and Malaysians were oblivious to the danger. The Indonesians had moved into this area with approximately 150 soldiers, or about 200 soldiers stated by some records, and 300 porters.

== Battle ==
On the early morning of September 28, a Malaysian border scout left his position to visit his sick wife in the village. While in the village, he spotted some Indonesian soldiers and raced back to warn his comrades. Corporal Gurung then rushed to the signallers and told them to call for support. He then grabbed a case of grenades and returned to the hill. As soon as he reached the top, the Indonesians fired 60mm mortars at them. As the signallers were trying to call in support from a school hut, the Indonesians raked the hut with gunfire, killing one Gurkha and one PFF operator. Another PFF operator was wounded but managed to stagger away back to his comrades. Meanwhile, the forces on the hill received heavy fire, but returned fire and put up a spirited defence. The fighting lasted for several hours. One Gurkha was killed by mortar fire, and another wounded by a bullet to the leg. Five Indonesians were killed. The Malaysian border scouts tried to slip away when they lost spirit. All but one were captured and frogmarched away. The remaining Gurkhas retreated. The Indonesians proceeded to execute ten of the captured border scouts, plunder the village, and bury their dead.

Other Gurkha units were soon airlifted in by helicopter and began attacking stragglers and small units broken off from the main force, all the while hunting for the main force. Helicopters enabled the Gurkhas to deploy ambush parties to likely withdrawal routes in orchestrated action that lasted until the end of October. The tortured bodies of seven Border Scouts were found.

Twenty-six Indonesians were killed when their longboats were caught in an ambush on 1 October, the survivors of that attack were killed in an ambush on 10 October with 2 others being killed in separate ambushes.

== Aftermath ==
The battle had proved costly for both sides, with 13 British and Malaysian deaths and 33 Indonesian deaths. The local population lost all trust in the Indonesians after watching the killings of the captured border scouts.

Tejbahadur Gurung was awarded the Military Medal for his leadership during the battle.
