= Kalabakan =

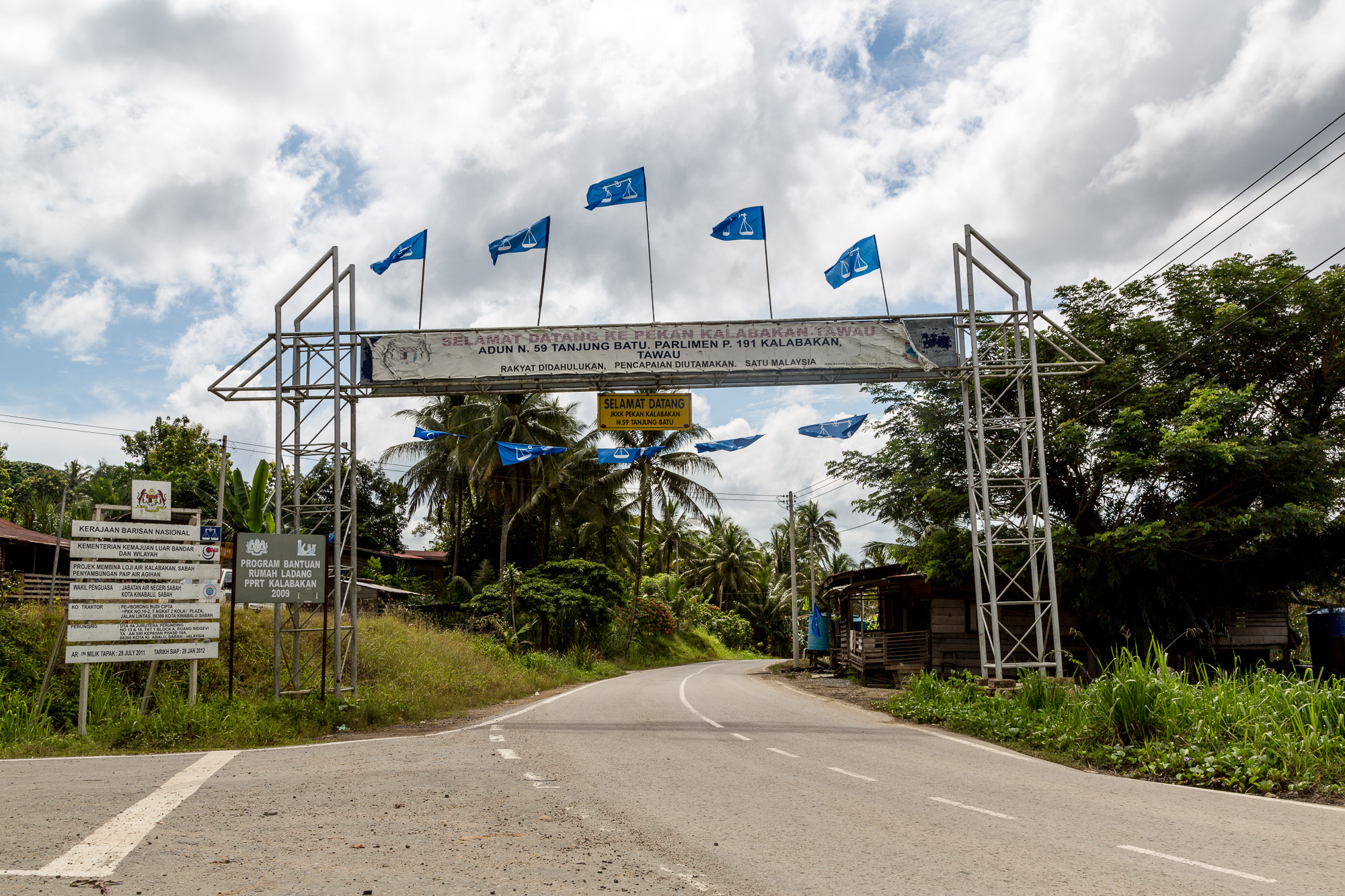
- The main road gate to Kalabakan town

- Location within Borneo
- Coordinates: 4°25′N 117°29′E
- Country: Malaysia
- State: Sabah
- District: Kalabakan

Location of Kalabakan in Kalabakan District

Kalabakan is a town and the capital of Kalabakan District, Sabah, Malaysia. It is located in the Tawau Division, and is about 55 kilometres west of the town of Tawau.
