= Malaysia Volunteers Corps Department =

- Jabatan Sukarelawan Malaysia
- Country: Malaysia
- Allegiance: Malaysia
- Branch: Ministry of Home Affairs (Malaysia)
- Type: Civilian Organization
- Role: Military reserve Auxiliary police Security police Border control
- Size: 3,064,456
- Motto: To serve faithfully
- March: Gema RELA
- Engagements: Malaysian Emergency as the Home Guard

Commanders
- Minister of Home Affairs (Malaysia): Saifuddin Nasution
- Director-General: Rosli Yaakob

The People's Volunteer Corps (Malay: Jabatan Sukarelawan Malaysia), abbreviated RELA, officially the Malaysia Volunteers Corps Department, is a civil volunteer corps formed by the Malaysian government. Their roles include: helping to spread awareness of government policies to the public; assisting other government agencies in carrying out duties; conducting local social and socio-economic activities; and developing human capital through trainings that are appropriate.

RELA has limited authority to raid suspected streets or places, such as factories, restaurants or hotels, and may interrogate or detain people who do not have travel documents, such as passports or work permits, on their person. They are also in charge of security, are absorbed into the Malaysian Army as minor support groups during times of war, and are tasked with search and rescue work as needed.

On 17 March 2020, the Malaysian Government announced that RELA would assist the Royal Malaysian Police and Malaysian Armed Forces to enforce the Movement Control Order until the end of the COVID-19 pandemic.

== History ==
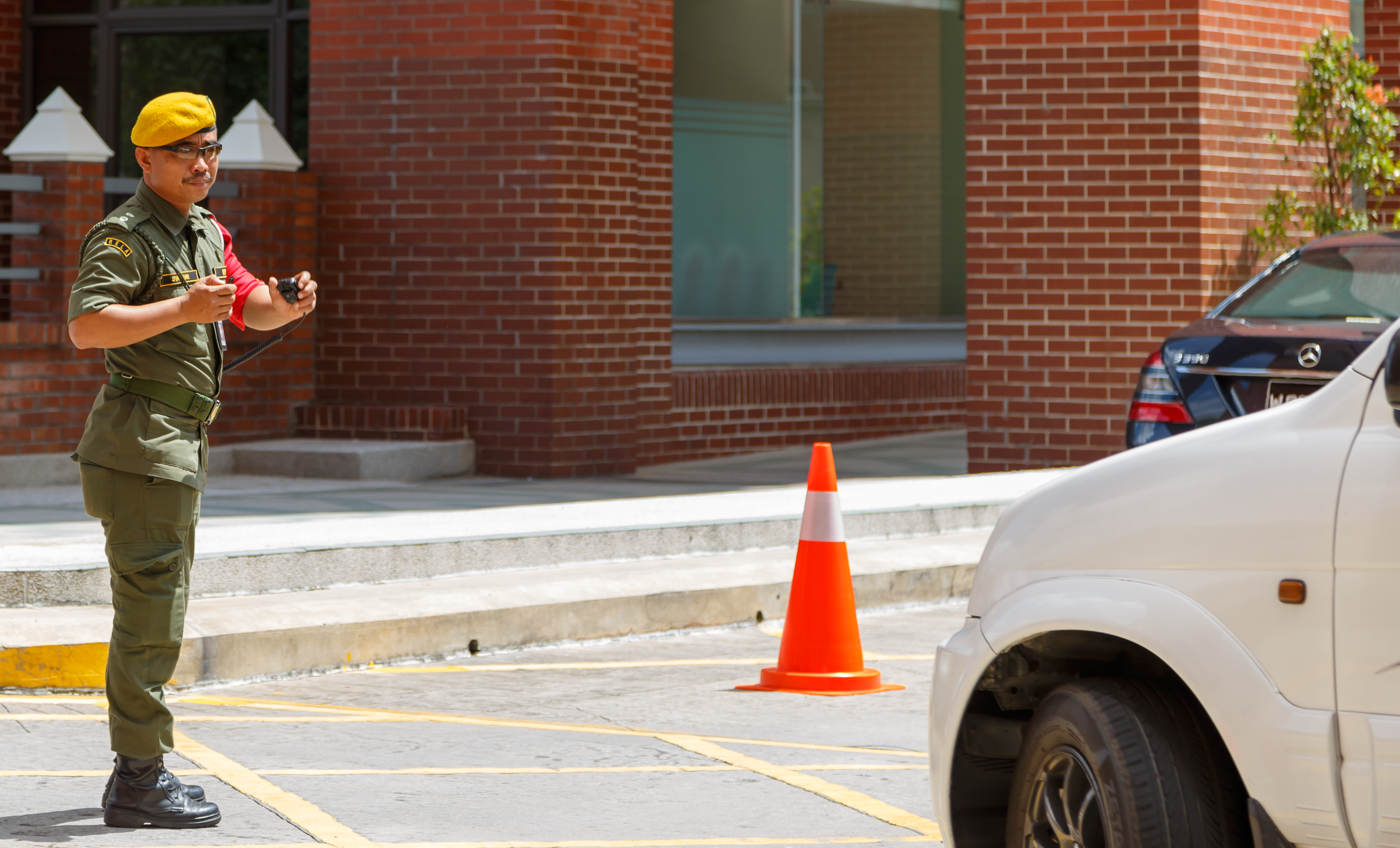
Member of Malaysia Volunteers Corps.

The People's Volunteer Corps is closely related to the Home Guard that was established when the Malayan Emergency was declared in 1948, and was dissolved when the Emergency ended on 31 July 1960. Its original purpose was to oppose communist fighters, and now acts against illegal immigrants. There are 2.8 million people in the corps, most of whom are untrained volunteers. In 2008, RELA was given charge of immigration detention centres.

== Personnel ==
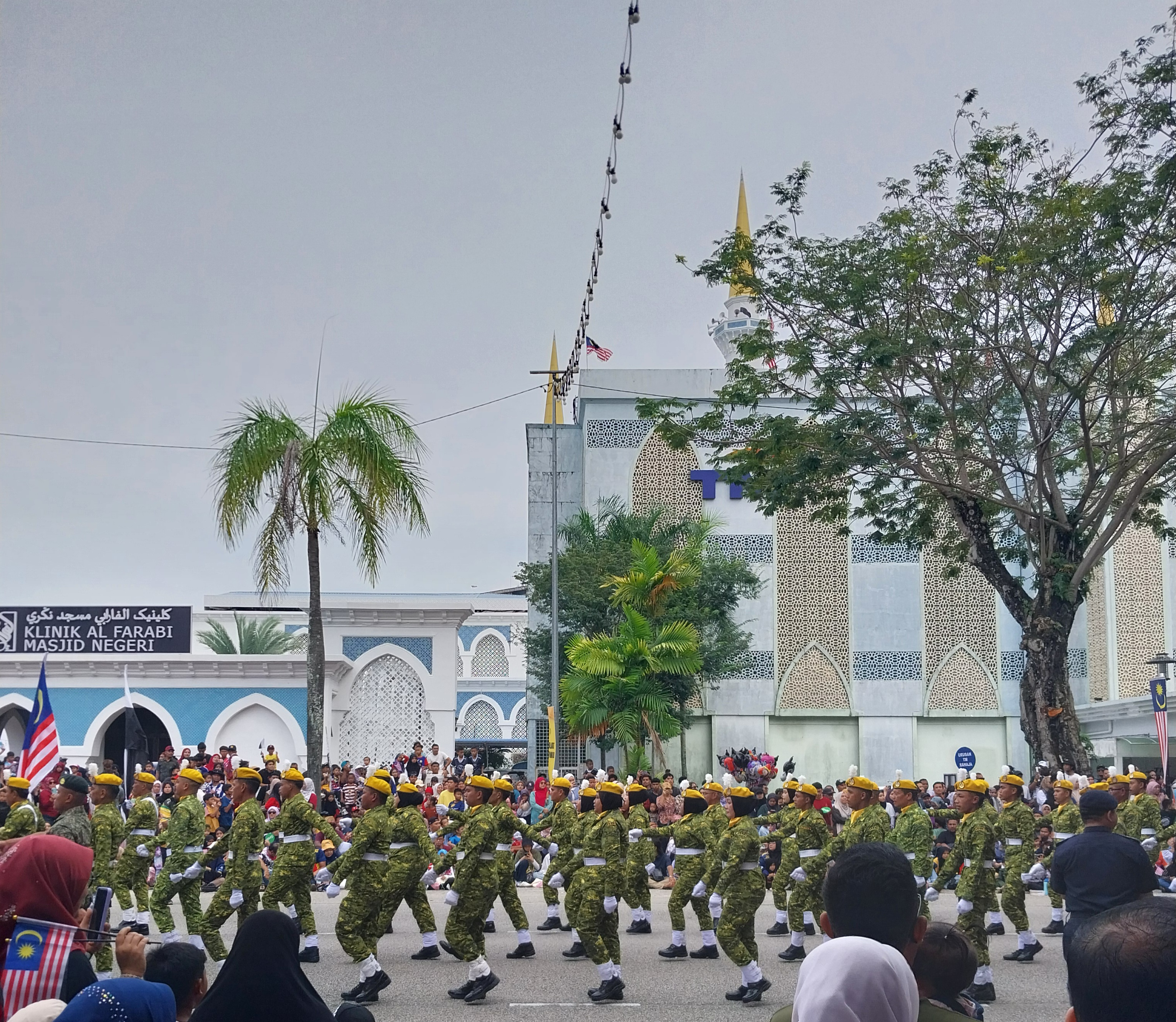
Malaysia Volunteers Corps in parade.

=== Strength ===
- Current strength of RELA in terms of personnel as of 13 Nov 2017

Personnel

| Overall | 3,064,456 |
| Platoons | TBA |
| Male | 1,825,421 |
| Female | 1,239,035 |

=== Ranks ===
| Rank group | General / flag officers | | | | Senior officers | | | Junior officers |
|---|---|---|---|---|---|---|---|---|---|---|
| The People's Volunteer Corps |
| The People's Volunteer Corps | Ketua Pesuruhjaya | Timbalan Ketua Pesuruhjaya | Pesuruhjaya | Timbalan Pesuruhjaya | Penolong Pesuruhjaya Kanan | Penolong Pesuruhjaya | Penguasa | Timbalan Penguasa Kanan | Timbalan Penguasa | Penolong Penguasa Kanan |

| Rank group | Senior NCOs | | | | Junior NCOs | | Enlisted |
|---|---|---|---|---|---|---|---|
| The People's Volunteer Corps |
| The People's Volunteer Corps | Penolang Penguasa I | Penolong Penguasa II | Pegawal tinggi I | Pegawal tinggi II | Pegawal Kanan I | Pegawal Kanan II |

== Equipment ==
Equipments

- Walkie-talkie models by the following manufacturers:
  - Motorola,
  - Kenwood Corporation, and
  - Baofeng UV-5R

Weapons

- T-baton
- Norinco CQ (M16A1 clone)
- M16A1

== Criticism ==
The Human Rights Watch has called for People's Volunteer Corps to be dissolved, accusing it of violating human rights, conducting illegal raids and extortions.

According to the United Nations Human Development Report of 2009, "Migrant activists say that RELA volunteers have become vigilantes, planting evidence to justify arrests of migrants and using excessive force in their policing. The government has recently announced its intention to curb abuses and is currently looking into ways of improving RELA by providing training to its members."
