= Tawau District =

Tawau District Daerah Tawau
- District
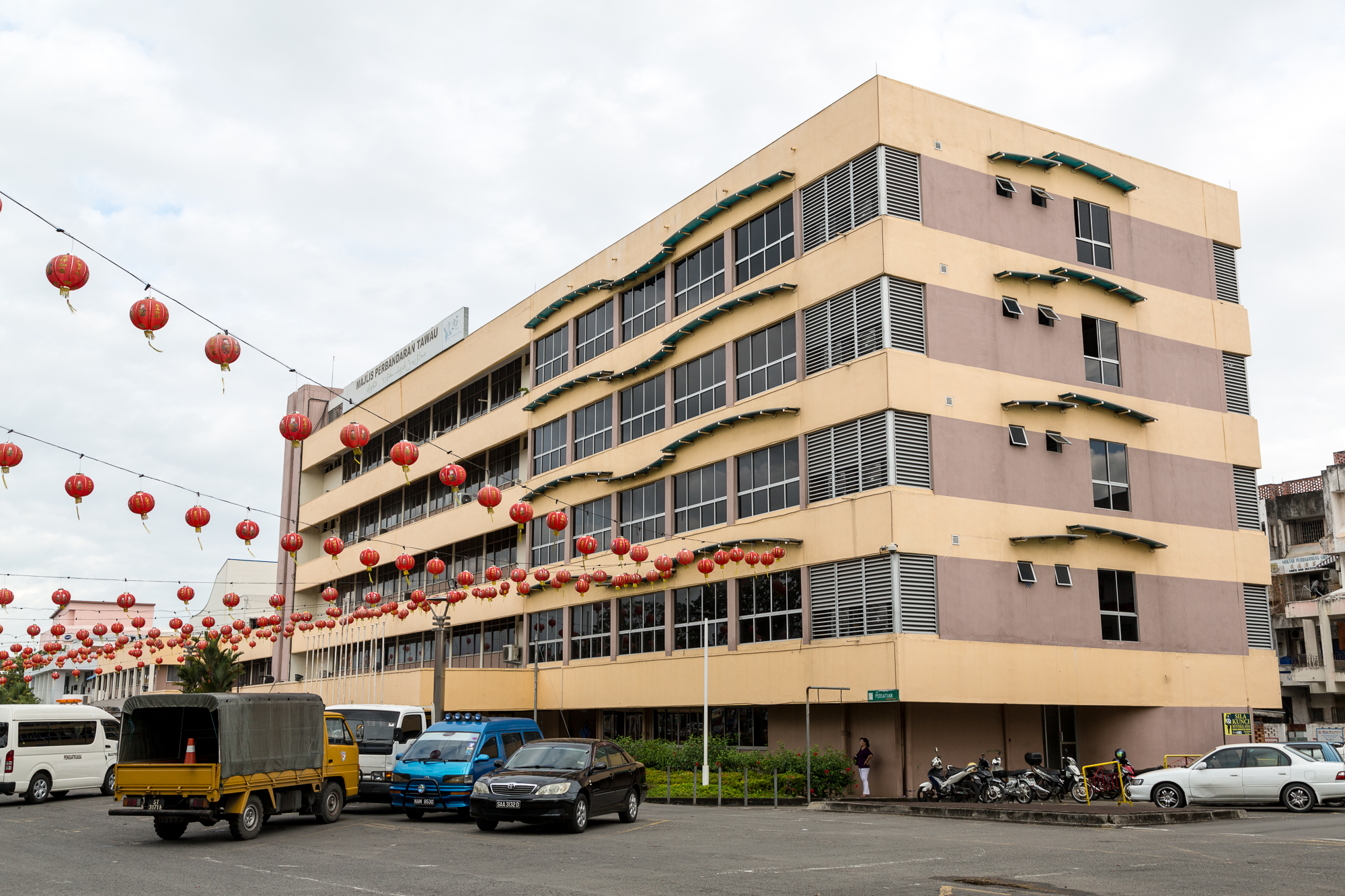
- Tawau Municipal Council office.

- Seal

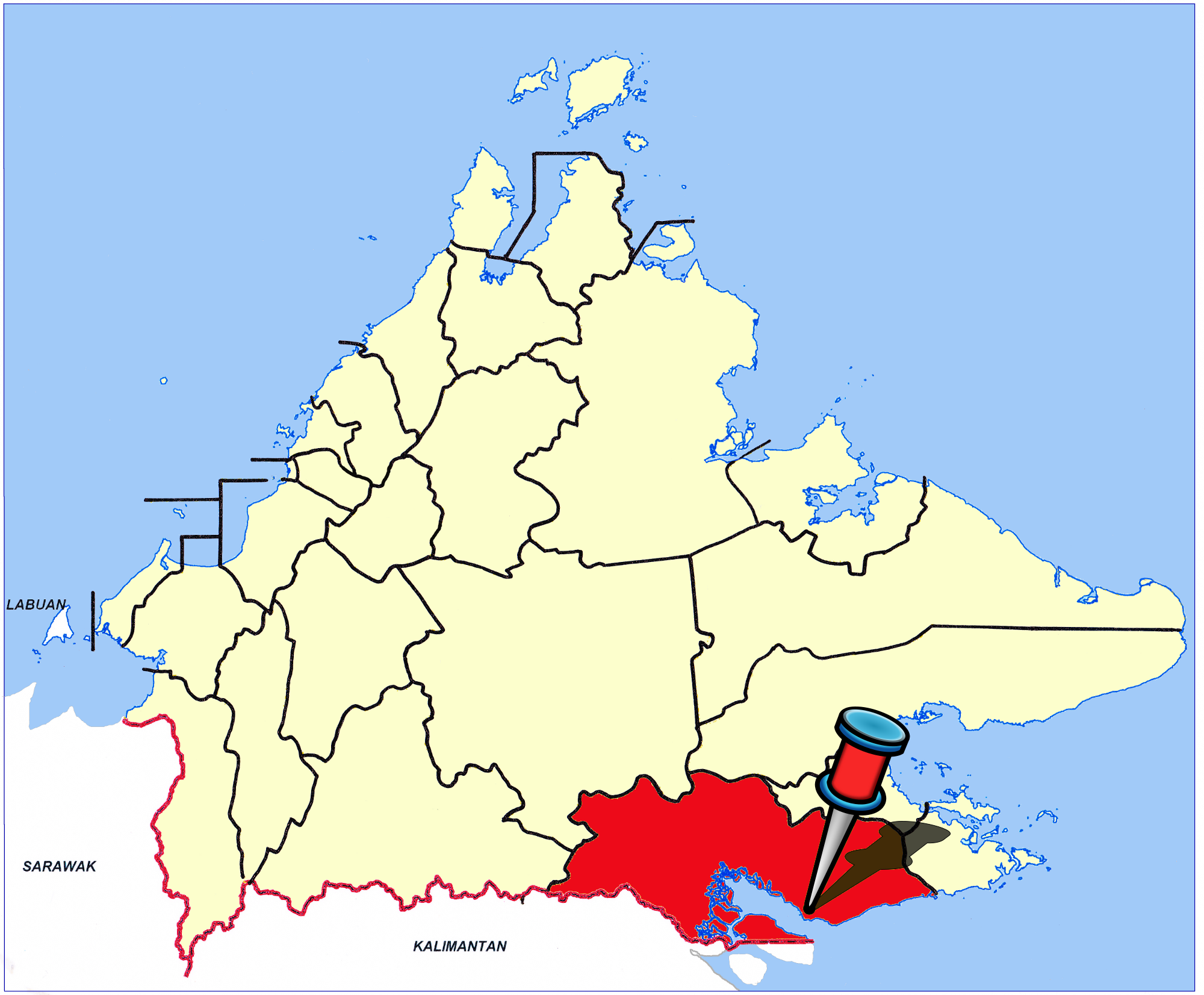
- Coordinates: 4°14′33.4″N 117°53′33.16″E
- Country: Malaysia
- State: Sabah
- Division: Tawau
- Capital: Tawau

Government
  - District Officer: Amrullah Kamal

Area
  - Total: 6,125 km^{2} (2,365 sq mi)

Population (2010)
  - Total: 397,673
- Website: mpt.sabah.gov.my

Map of Tawau District

The Tawau District (Malay: Daerah Tawau) is an administrative district in the Malaysian state of Sabah, part of the Tawau Division which also includes the districts of Kunak, Lahad Datu, Semporna and Tawau. The capital of the district is in Tawau Town. The district also includes the northern half of Sebatik Island, which is shared with Indonesia's North Kalimantan province.

== History ==
The administration of Tawau changed several times in the course of its history. From 1890, the administration managed by the North Borneo Chartered Company, which put this task alternately in the hands of various residents, district officers or candidates for the office of the district officers. During the Japanese occupation, the administration was carried out by Japanese military personnel. The pre-war administration system was continued after the end of World War II. The post-war administration of the city was from 1948 to 1955 by the provisions of the Reconstruction and Development Plan, drafted by the Development Officer of the Government, E. W. Ellison who was closely tied to the British colonial government. Only in 1955 did the city regain full control over its finances and administration of its public office with the founding of the Tawau Town Board. Even after the formation of Malaysia in 1963, the modern state of Sabah continued to use residents and district officers until 1981. On 1 January 1982, the Tawau Town Board and the Tawau Rural District Council was merged to become the Tawau Municipal Council. In March 1983, Tawau was administratively divided into four areas: urban area (5,918 hectares), suburbs (4,783 hectares), surrounding countryside (591,384 hectares) and sea area (26,592 hectares).

== Demographics ==
Tawau district is the second largest of Sabah's 25 districts, with 397,673 inhabitants after Kota Kinabalu. Tawau consists of Bugis, Tidung, Murut, Chinese, Lun Bawang/Lundayeh, Kadazandusun, Bajau, some of Indonesians and Philippines.

== Climate ==
Climate data for Tawau (1991–2020 normals)
Month	Jan	Feb	Mar	Apr	May	Jun	Jul	Aug	Sep	Oct	Nov	Dec	Year
Record high °C (°F)	34.4 (93.9)	35.1 (95.2)	35.5 (95.9)	35.2 (95.4)	35.2 (95.4)	34.4 (93.9)	33.6 (92.5)	33.9 (93.0)	34.4 (93.9)	34.5 (94.1)	34.8 (94.6)	35.4 (95.7)	35.5 (95.9)
Mean daily maximum °C (°F)	31.1 (88.0)	31.5 (88.7)	31.8 (89.2)	31.9 (89.4)	31.8 (89.2)	31.4 (88.5)	31.1 (88.0)	31.2 (88.2)	31.5 (88.7)	31.7 (89.1)	31.7 (89.1)	31.3 (88.3)	31.5 (88.7)
Daily mean °C (°F)	26.4 (79.5)	26.6 (79.9)	26.9 (80.4)	27.2 (81.0)	27.3 (81.1)	26.9 (80.4)	26.7 (80.1)	26.8 (80.2)	26.9 (80.4)	26.8 (80.2)	26.8 (80.2)	26.6 (79.9)	26.8 (80.2)
Mean daily minimum °C (°F)	23.1 (73.6)	23.1 (73.6)	23.3 (73.9)	23.7 (74.7)	23.9 (75.0)	23.6 (74.5)	23.3 (73.9)	23.3 (73.9)	23.3 (73.9)	23.4 (74.1)	23.5 (74.3)	23.4 (74.1)	23.4 (74.1)
Record low °C (°F)	18.2 (64.8)	18.7 (65.7)	20.2 (68.4)	21.8 (71.2)	20.6 (69.1)	20.9 (69.6)	21.0 (69.8)	21.0 (69.8)	21.2 (70.2)	19.9 (67.8)	21.2 (70.2)	18.2 (64.8)	18.2 (64.8)
Average precipitation mm (inches)	143.2 (5.64)	106.0 (4.17)	126.6 (4.98)	123.4 (4.86)	164.0 (6.46)	174.9 (6.89)	192.1 (7.56)	209.6 (8.25)	135.4 (5.33)	169.8 (6.69)	172.1 (6.78)	213.5 (8.41)	1,930.6 (76.01)
Average precipitation days (≥ 1.0 mm)	11.3	9.0	10.3	9.4	11.5	12.4	12.5	11.4	10.4	12.7	13.2	14.8	138.9
Mean monthly sunshine hours	182.5	183.8	216.5	222.6	231.1	191.6	216.2	218.9	198.3	198.1	193.3	194.0	2,446.9
Source 1: World Meteorological Organization
Source 2: NOAA

== Gallery ==
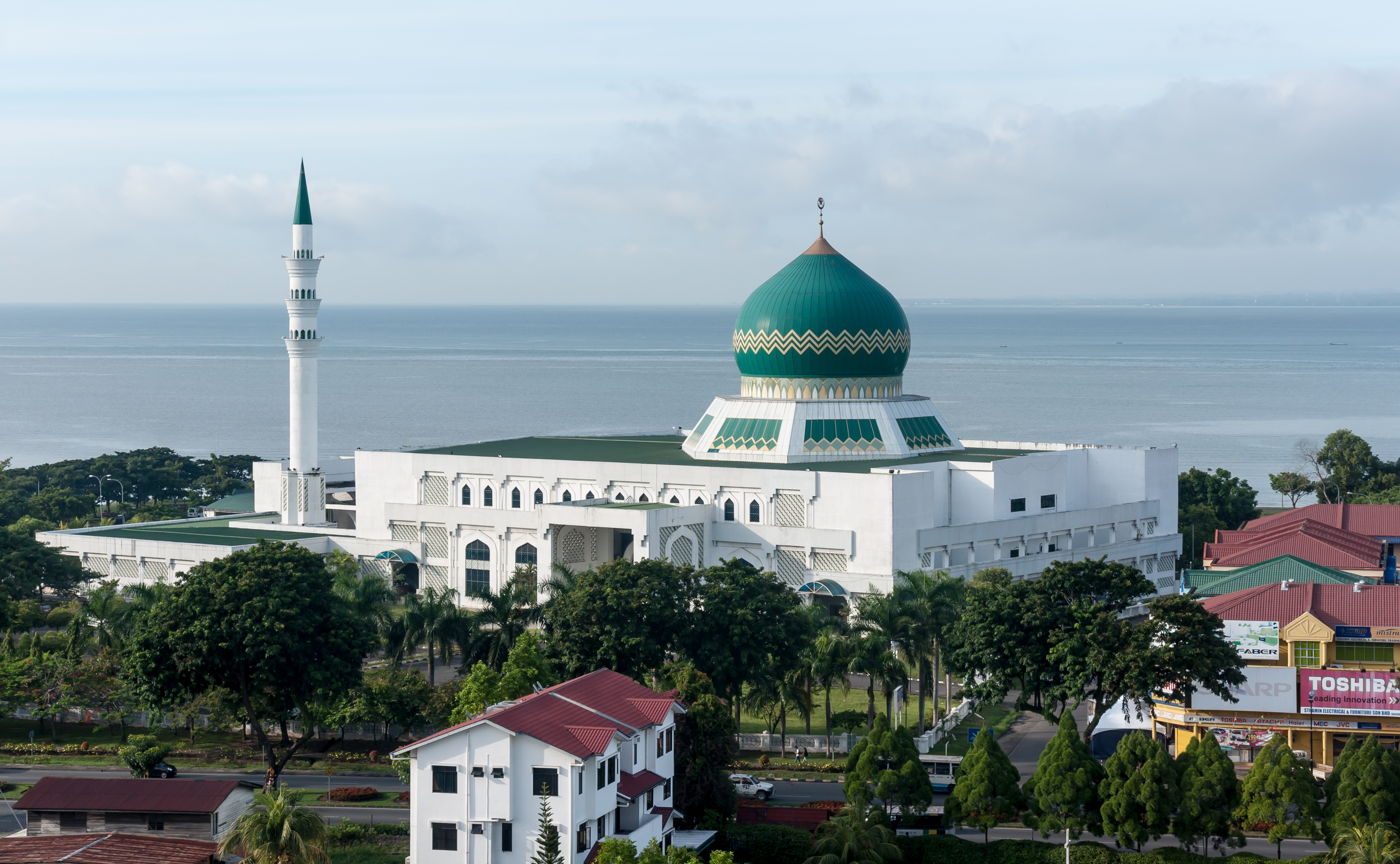
Al-Kauthar Mosque.

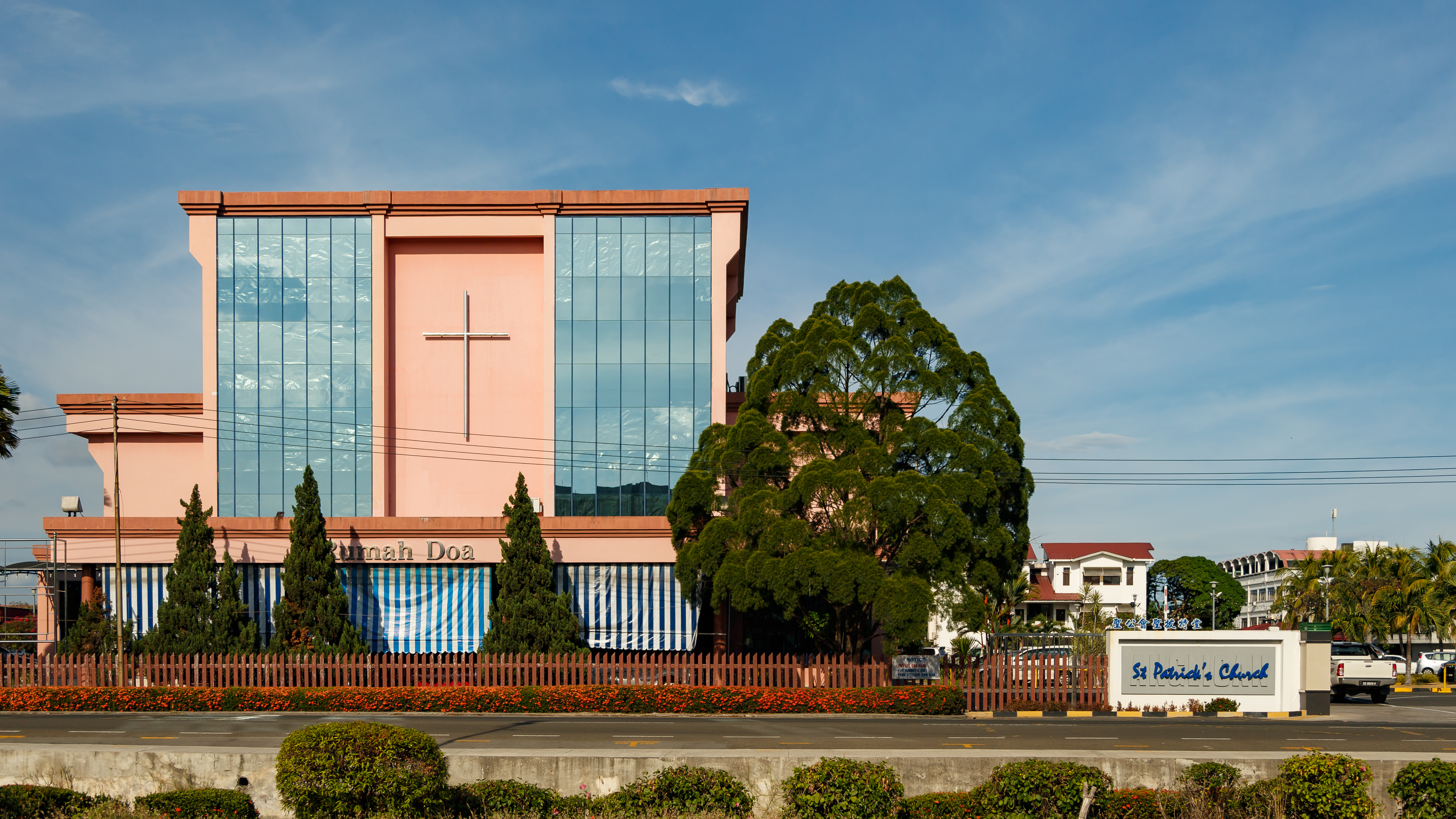
St. Patrick Anglican Church.

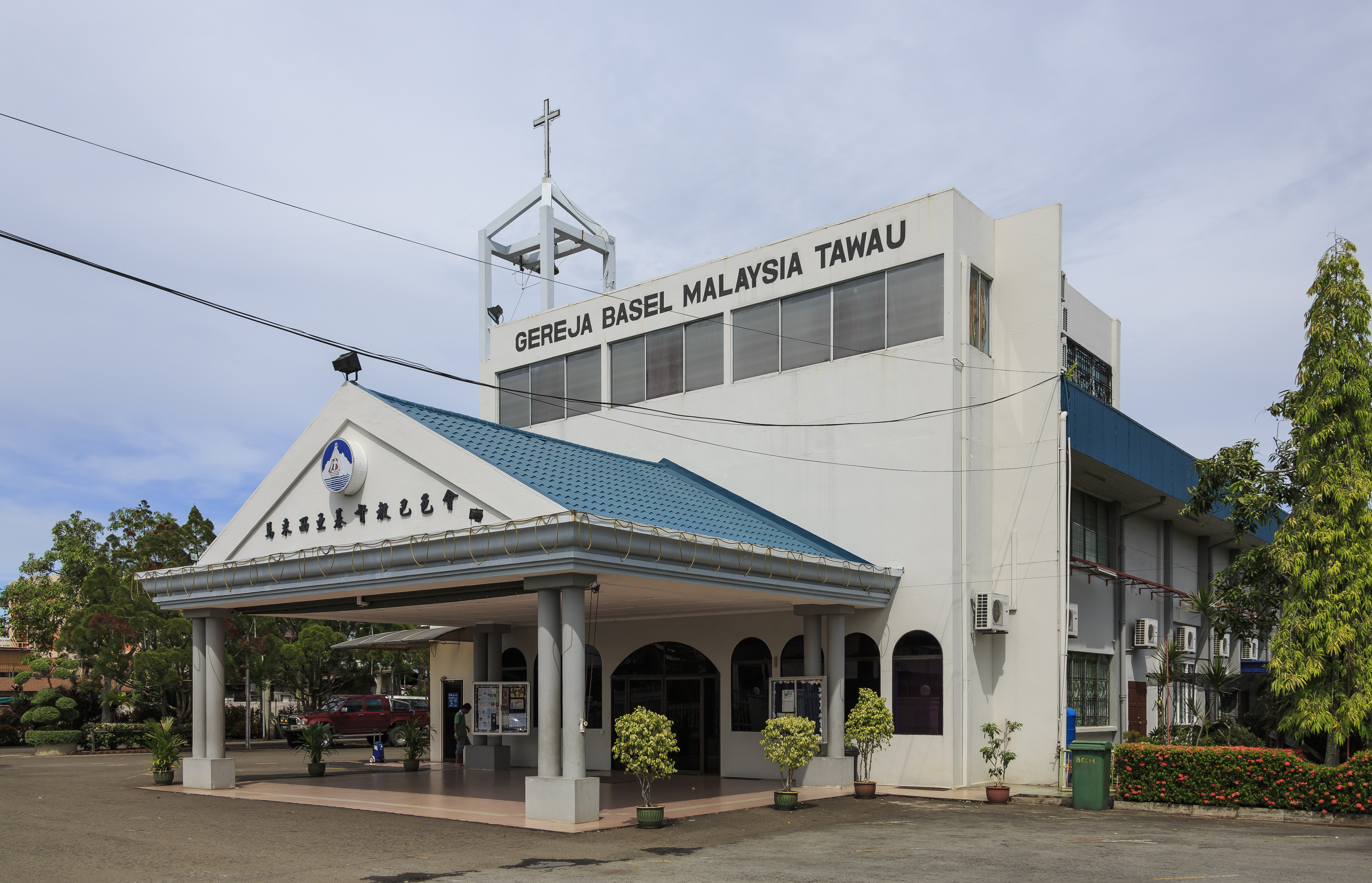
Tawau Basel Church.

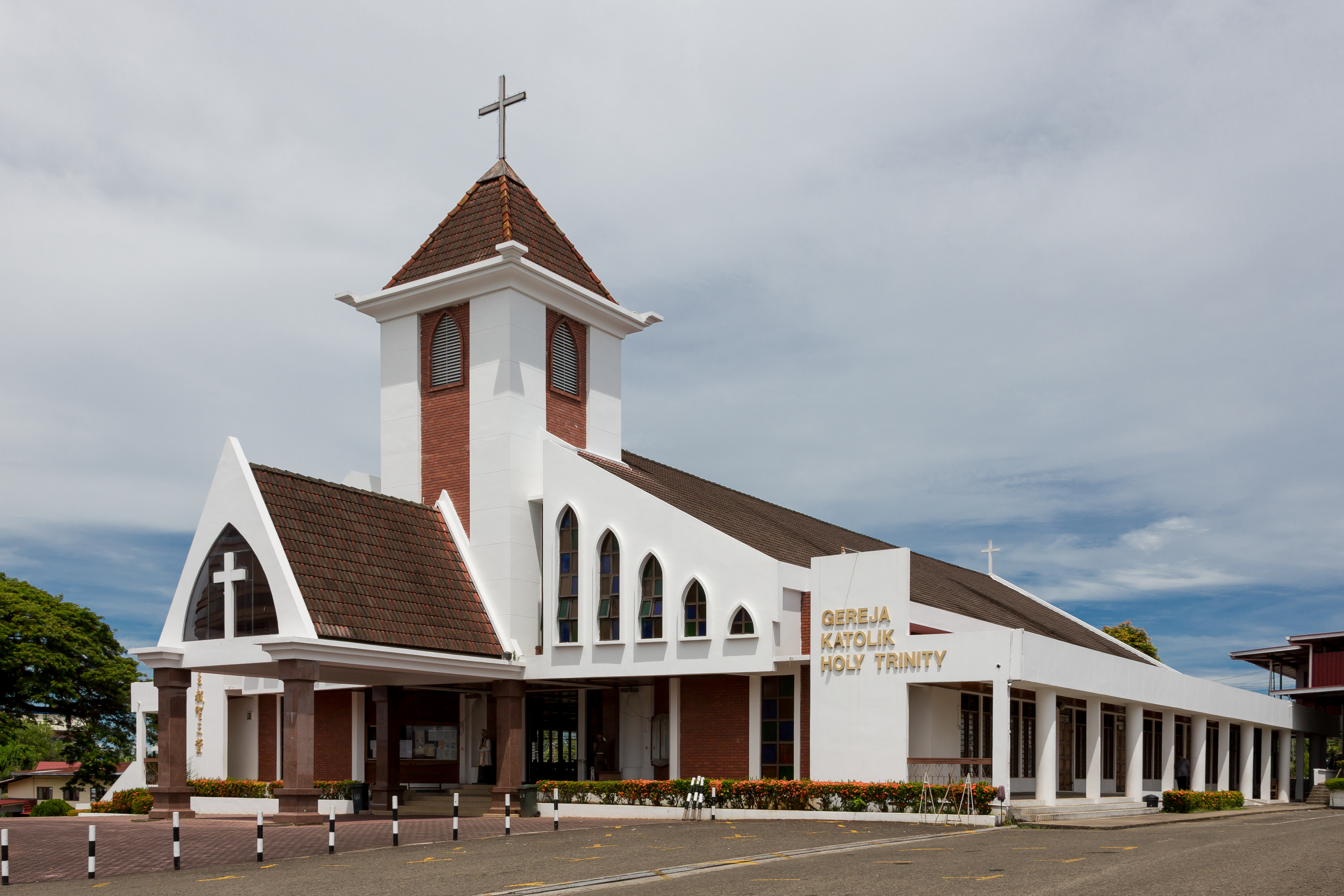
Holy Trinity Catholic Church.

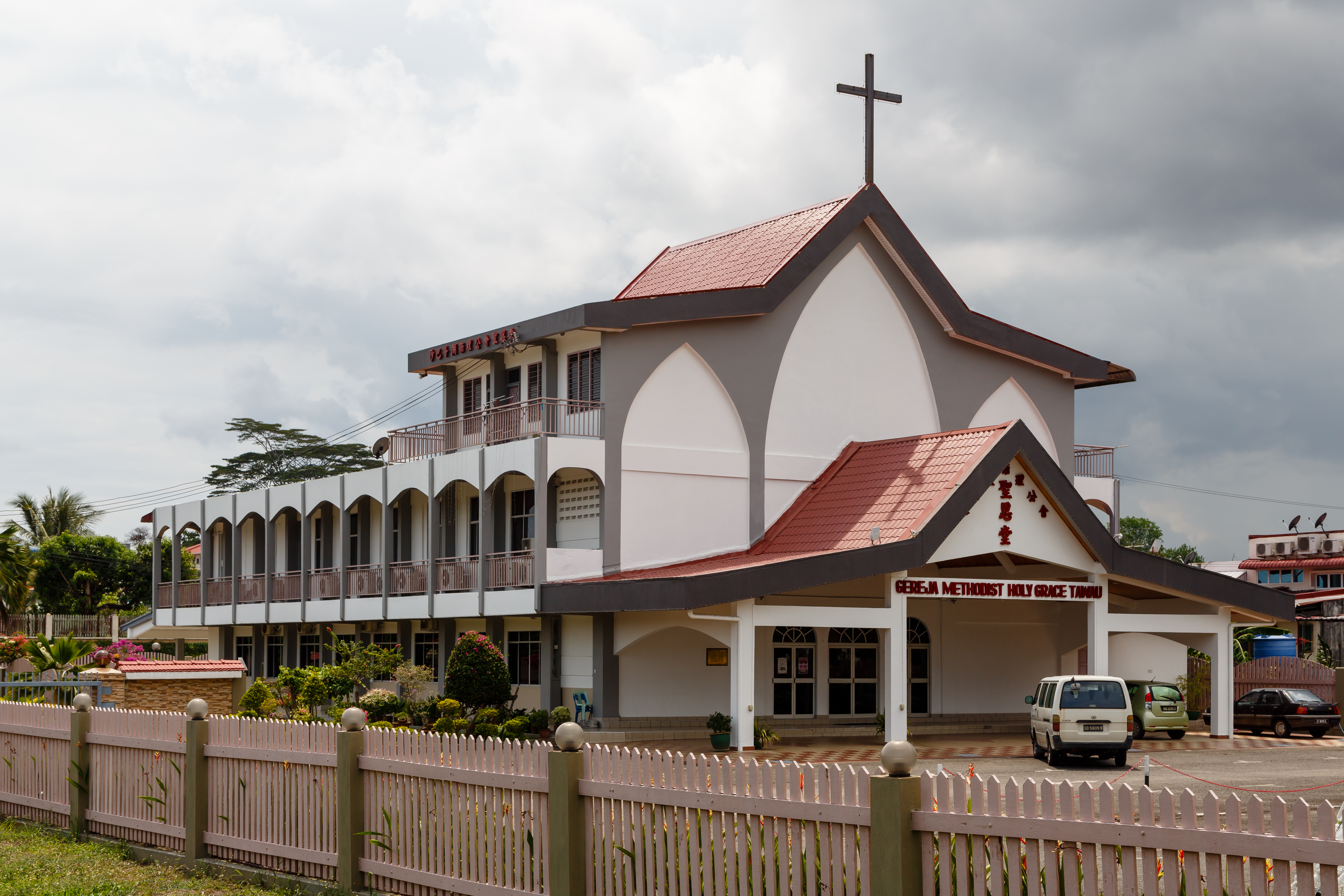
Holy Grace Methodist Church.

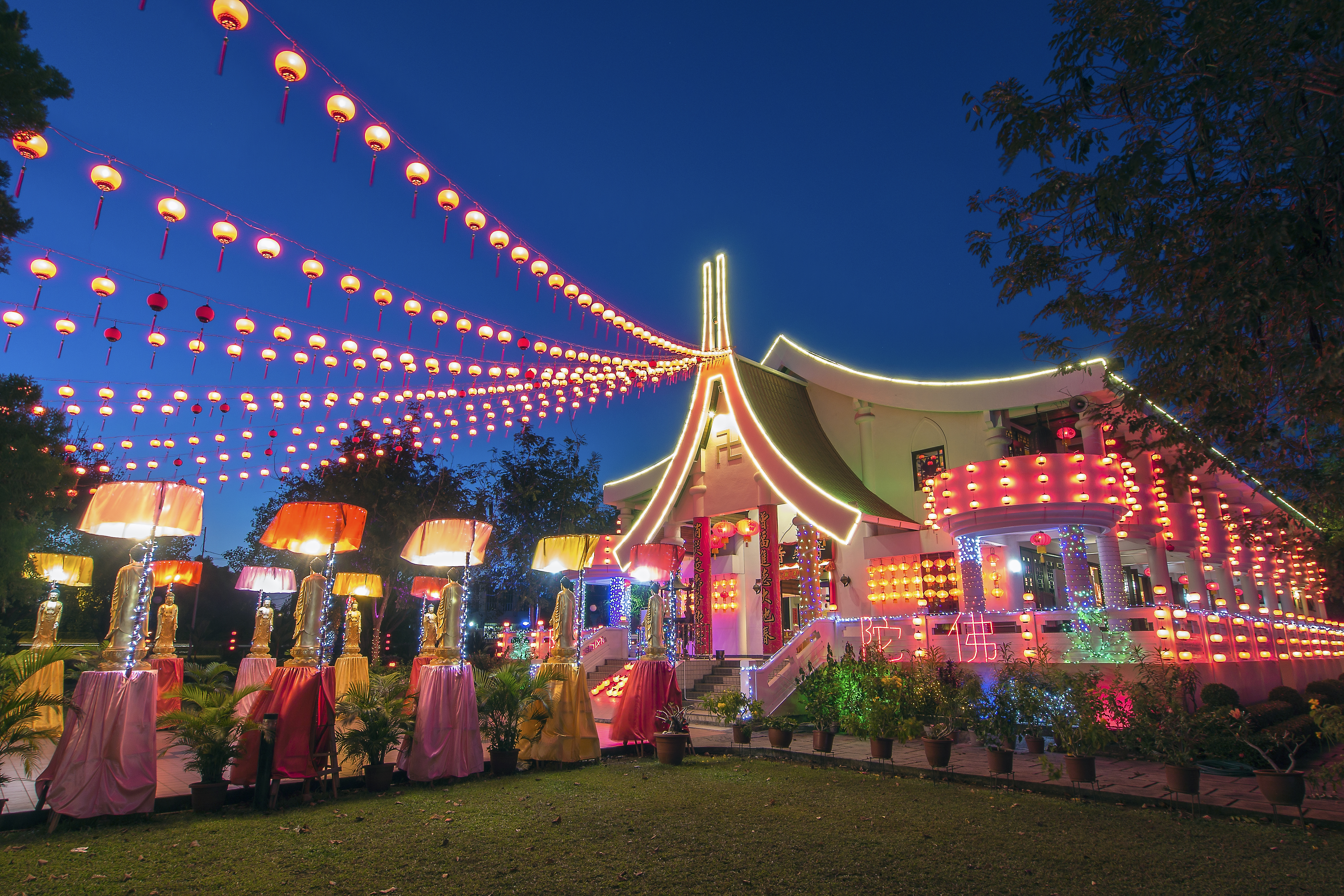
Pu Zhao Temple.

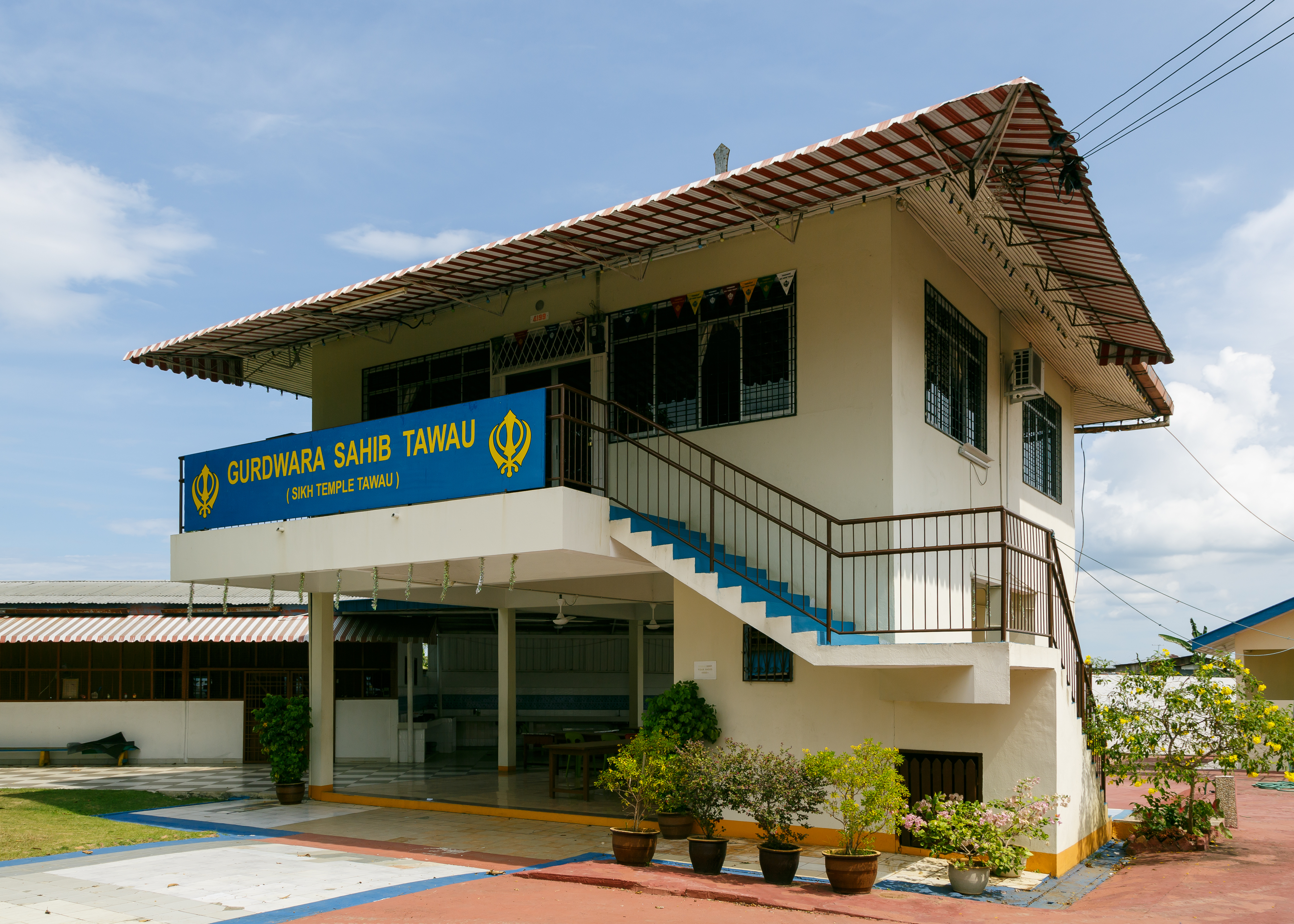
Gurdwara Sahib Tawau.

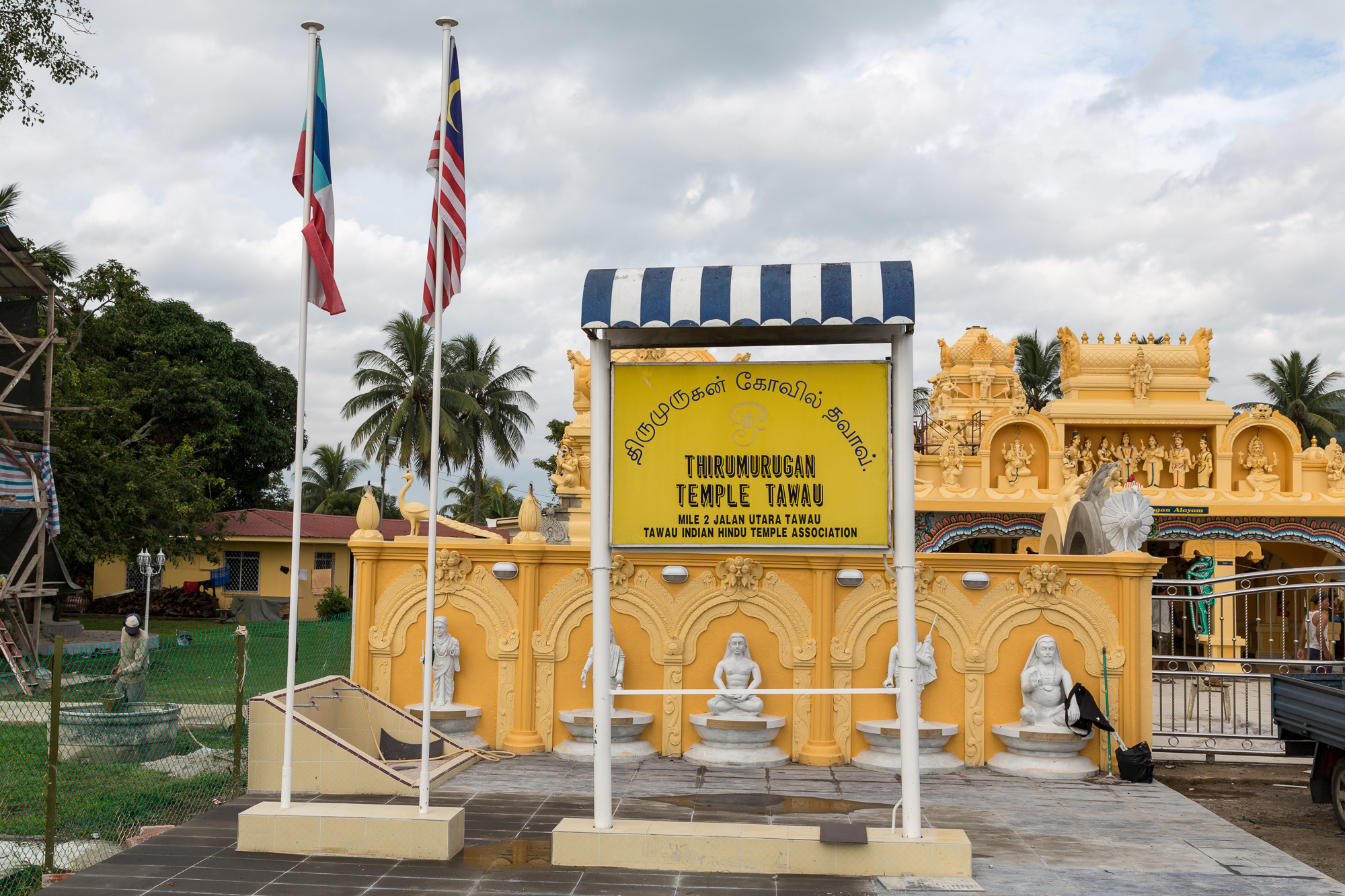
Thirumurugan Temple.

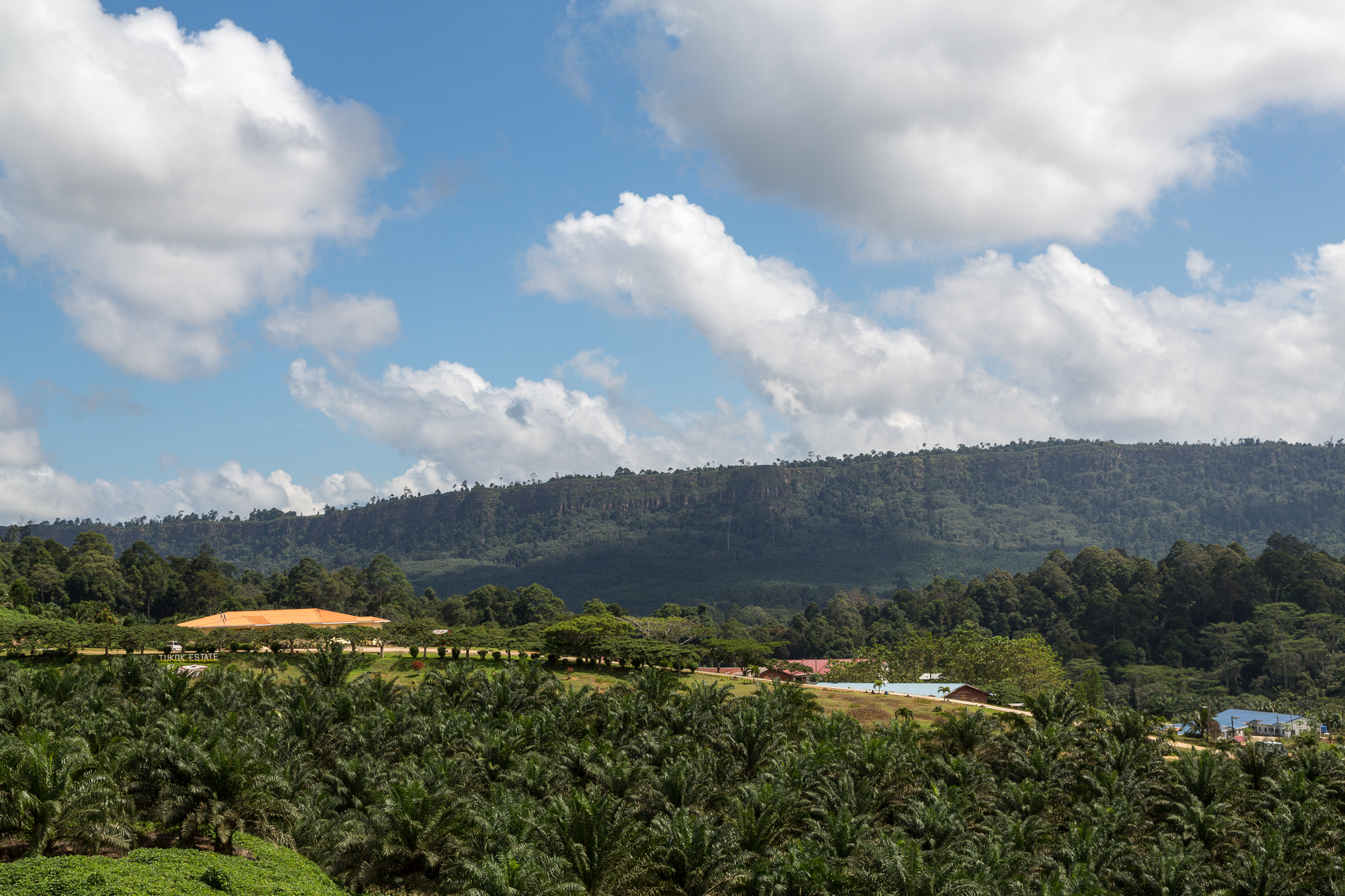
Tukok Hill Estate.

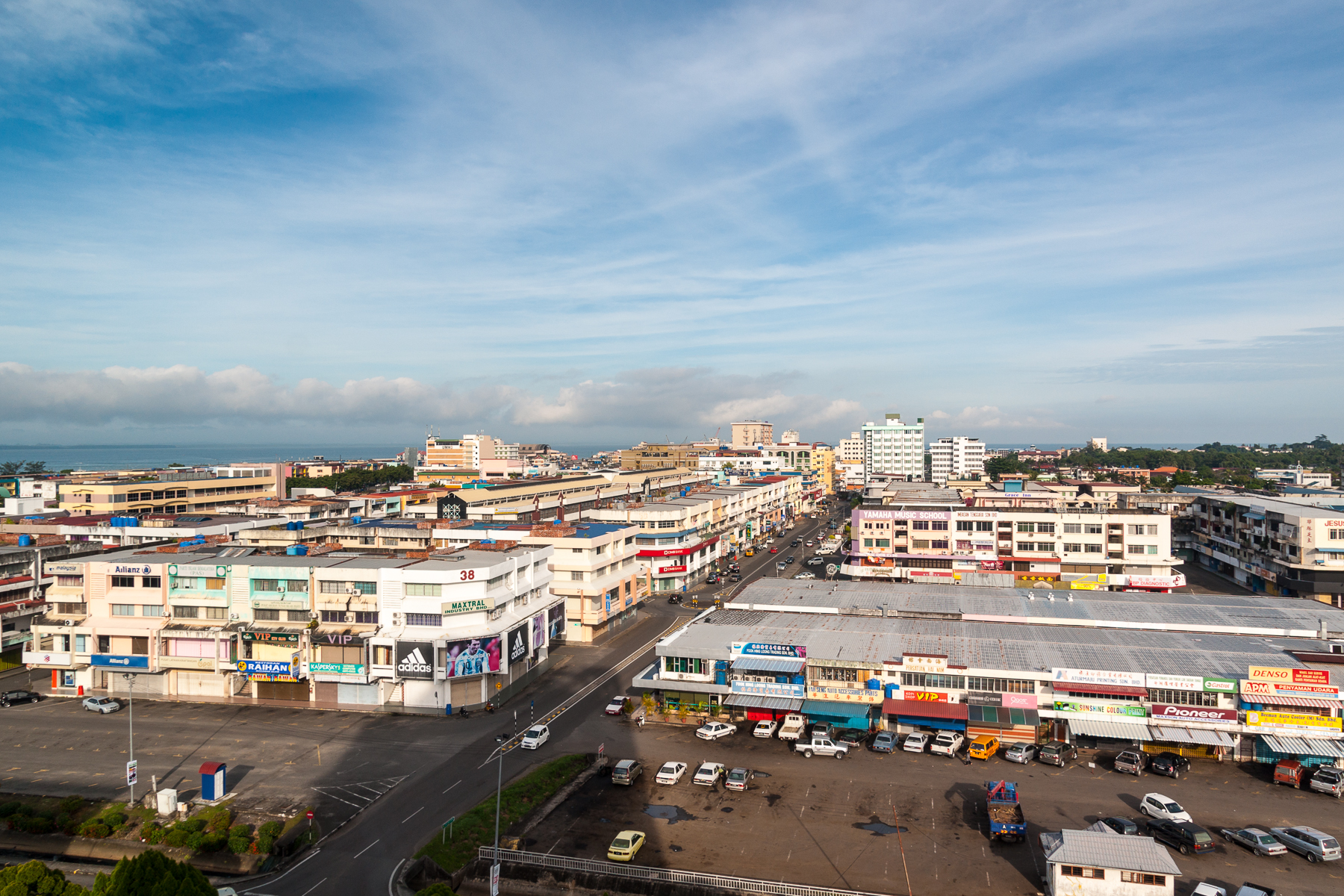
Tawau town centre.

== See also ==
- Districts of Malaysia

== Literature ==
- Goodlet, Ken (2010). Tawau: The Making of a Tropical Community. Opus Publications. ISBN 978-983-3987-38-2.
