= Begonia madaiensis =

Scientific classification
- Kingdom: Plantae
- Clade: Tracheophytes
- Clade: Angiosperms
- Clade: Eudicots
- Clade: Rosids
- Order: Cucurbitales
- Family: Begoniaceae
- Genus: Begonia
- Species: B. madaiensis

Binomial name
- Begonia madaiensis Kiew

Synonyms
- List

Species of flowering plant

Begonia madaiensis is a species of flowering plant in the family Begoniaceae, endemic to Mount Madai,Borneo. It is a cane begonia that grows in limestone.

== Distribution and habitat ==
There are 18 different species of begonia native to the 59 limestone hills in Sabah. Of these hills, 22 are protected by the Rafflesia Forest Reserve. The rest are no longer surrounded by forest, or lie within commercial forests that have been or will be logged. Because of the lack of forest, the flora on these hills are particularly vulnerable to fire. Quarrying, the collection of bird's nests, and tourism also degrade the environment.

Of the 18 begonia species, 12 are endemic to a single hill. B. madaiensis is one of these.

Distribution of Begonia species on limestone in Sabah
| District | Locality | Species |
|---|---|---|
Species found on single hills
| Pensiangan | Batu Punggul/Batu Tinahas | Begonia amphioxus Begonia anthonyi |
| Pensiangan | Sapulut | Begonia layang-layang |
| Pensiangan | Batu Urun | Begonia urunensis |
| Pensiangan | Pun Batu | Begonia punbatuensis |
| Kinabatangan | Bukit Dulung Lambu | Begonia gomantongensis Begonia malachostica |
| Kinabatangan | Melikop | Begonia melikopia |
| Lahad Datu | Mount Madai | Begonia madaiensis |
| Lahad Datu | Bukit Baturong | Begonia berhamanii Begonia baturongensis |
| Semporna | Batu Tengar | Begonia keithii |
Species found on several hills in the same area
| Pensiangan | Batu Punggul/Tinaha, Sapulut | Begonia lambii |
| Kinabatangan | Kinabatangan Valley (3 hills) | Begonia postarii |
| Kinabatangan | Kinabatangan Valley (3 hills) | Begonia heliostrophe |
| Lahad Datu | Segama River (5 hills) | Begonia diwolii Begonia keeana |
| Widespread on limestone in Sabah | | Begonia gueritziana |

== Plant physiology ==
Begonia madaiensis is unique among begonias in that it can live in full-sun. It will not flower in deep-shade. Like other Sabah limestone begonias, it has relatively small flowers.

== Etymology ==
The specific epithet refers to Mount Madai, where B. madaiensis is endemic.
