= Pagalungan, Malaysia =

Place and Sub-district in Sabah, Malaysia

Pagalungan
- Location within Borneo
- Coordinates: 4°30′01.7″N 116°25′20.9″E
- Country: Malaysia
- State: Sabah
- Division: Interior
- District: Nabawan
- Elevation: 168 m (551 ft)
- Highest elevation: 571 m (1,873 ft)

Population
  - Total: 12,000
- Website: PDKPagalungan.sabah.sbh.gov.my

Pagalungan is a sub-district in the Nabawan District, Interior Division of Sabah, Malaysia. It is located within the remote area of the district, which surrounds by hilly terrain. It also serves as a settlement within the new Sapulut-Salong-Pagalungan-Pensiangan Road.

The sub-district was divided into two mukims, which is Mukim Pensiangan and Mukim Pagalungan. Pagalungan also have immigration control post, which was located near the Indonesian border. The control post was expected to complete in 2022.

== History ==
It was once built as a settlement in 1950 by local loaders. Communities from Kampung Silungai trace roots back to the Kampung Bantul following the 1963 Malaysia-Indonesia Confrontation. 12 years later after the confrontation, a longhouse was then built in 1975, with a modest L-shaped structure featuring zinc roofing and tree bark walls.

Pagalungan was gazetted as a sub-district on June 1, 2006. The road which led to Sapulut are mostly unpaved until 2026.

== Etymology ==
Pagalungan was originates from the Murut word "Pahalungan", which describes the meeting point or confluence of the Logongon River and the Tagol River.

== Geography ==
Pagalungan sit within the southern part of Nabawan District within the Interior Division of Sabah. It is located 98 km (61 mi) of Nabawan, and 25 km (16 mi) of the Malaysia-Indonesia border. Pagalungan comes with the meeting point of two local river; Logongon River and Tagol River. Surrounding by undulating, hilly and mountainous terrain is part of the southwestern Witti Range.
