= Rundum Rebellion =

1915 rebellion against Company rule in North Borneo

Rumdum Rebellion
| Location | Rundum District, British North Borneo |
| Result | Chartered Company victory; Rebellion suppressed |

Belligerents
| Rundum Rebels | North Borneo Chartered Company |

Commanders and leaders
| Ingkun of the Silangit ☠; Antanum ☠; Singdau of the Telekoson; Mulang of the Talangkai; Antak | (North Borneo) Charles Herbert Harington; (North Borneo) Noel Blake Baboneau; (North Borneo) Henry William Lisbrian Bunbury; (North Borneo) C. H. Pearson; (North Borneo) R. R. M. Tabuteau |

Units involved
| Rebel Units | British North Borneo Constabulary |

Casualties and losses
| 430–800 killed | Unknown |

The Rundum Rebellion, also known as the Rundum Rising or the Rundum Revolt, was a war of rebellion against the North Borneo Chartered Company and its Company rule over Rundum, the newly established district of North Borneo. The Rebellion was led by Antanum, a legendary figure of the Murut people believed to have supernatural powers. The Company's effort to suppress the rebellion was known as the Rundum Expedition, engaged by the British North Borneo Constabulary, the sole military and police force of North Borneo.

== Background ==
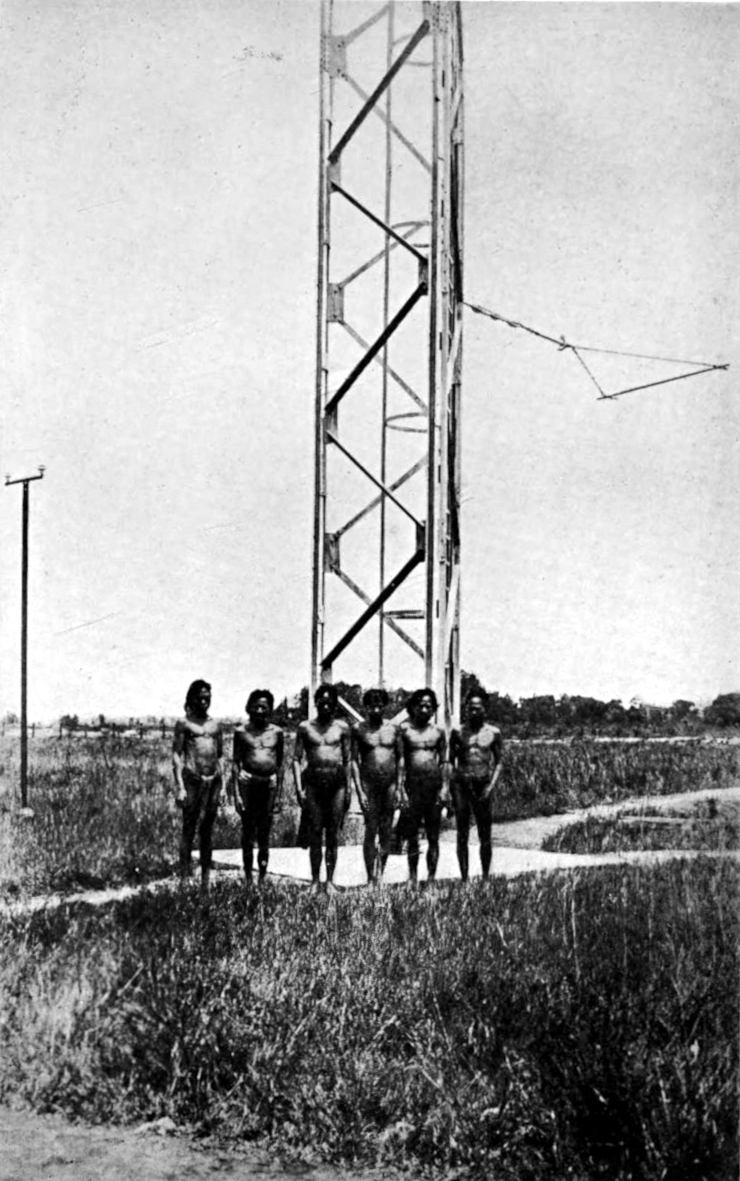
The many Murut tribes of the interior were confronted with a new British Company rule, and felt their way of life was being threatened. Here, a small group of Murut stand next to a newly installed wireless station.

In 1881, the North Borneo Chartered Company was established with the sole governing authority over North Borneo. The Rundum and Pensiangan districts were the last places in North Borneo to be pacified by the Company. The villagers in these regions were frustrated to be subjected to Company rule, especially at the imposition of new taxes by white men who they considered immigrants to the island. To their eyes, the British men had no authority or right to build roads or trains through their land, destroying vital island ecosystems in the process.

The Company imposed a head tax of one dollar per person, a tax on transplanted crops of 50 cents per 0.4 hectare, a tax on coconut trees to be used as tuak (25 cents per tree) and a tax on catching large fish and keeping dogs (one dollar per dog).

By 1905, a train station had been constructed at Tenom. An outbreak of smallpox followed. By 1907, a bridle path had been constructed that went to Rundum, Pensiangan, and the Sapulote.

One oral account maintains that the Company would not allow Murut couples to live together without paying the marriage tax on a marriage license. Much as was occurring at the same time throughout the British Empire, the Company would also practice child migration, taking children away from their parents to perform child labour. While child labour laws had been established in mainland Britain after excessive Child labour in the British Industrial Revolution, this far away from Whitehall the Company still maintained the practice.

Owen Rutter, writing from the British perspective, writes that apart from taxes, the Murut were mostly upset at the fact that they were restricted from clearing virgin jungles. Meanwhile, in the same book, Rutter also applauds the work of the North Borneo lumber company. This was largely related to the Ladang Ordinance of 1913, which required local residents to obtain a permit to clear forest.

However, as it has been noted by the researcher Callistus Fernandez at National University of Singapore:

"The use of the term Tagol Murut to include all Muruts in Nabawan-Pensiangan, Tenom, Sipitang and Keningau is a linguistic categorization. This categorization cannot be applied to the Muruts of 1915. Firstly, they were river-based - meaning that every tribe was associated with a river and took the name of the river as their source of identity."

=== Malingkote ===
The Company had also become increasingly concerned over the rise of Malingkote, a religious movement of Murut origin that had been invented by Tahang, from the Sapulote Murut tribe, in 1891. Within a short time, this religion had spread into many surrounding areas, including the coastal communities of the Dusun.

=== Blayong Rebellion ===
Between June and July 1914, Blayong led a rebellion against Company rule that was known as the Blayong Rebellion or the Blayong Uprising.

== History ==
=== Ingkun the Prophet ===
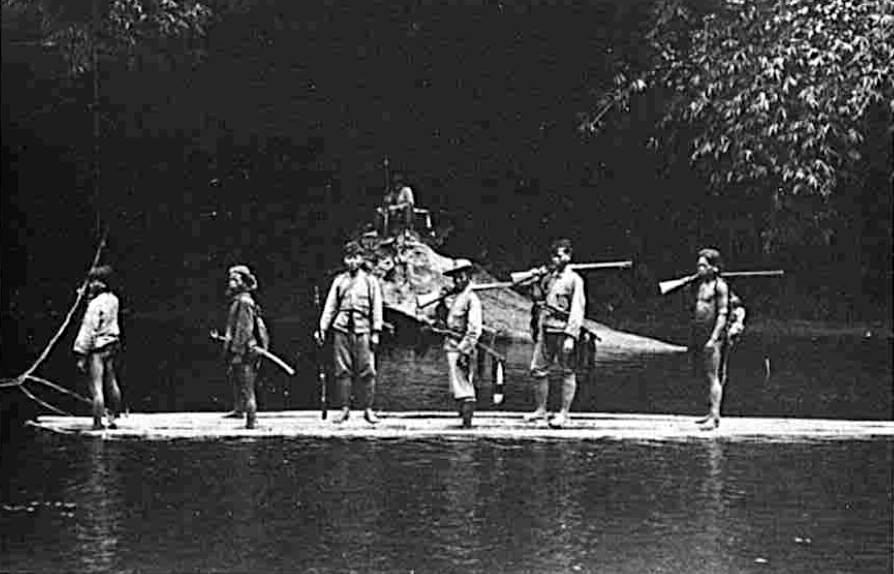
The British North Borneo Constabulary were the only military and police force of North Borneo.

Ingkun the Prophet, a local tribal chieftain of the Silangit River tribe, had just recently worked alongside the Company to attack a neighboring village his tribe had been at war with. According to official British reports, Ingkun had a prophetic dream one night. In this dream, a spirit figure visited him and told him that if he constructed a large underground chamber near the river, all of the Murut dead of generations would gather there, and this would spark a new Murut nation and dominance over the interior – much as had existed here thousands of years before they were conquered by the Majapahit, Brunei, and Sulu.

Shortly afterward, Inkgun got started constructing the fort that had appeared in his dreams. Many local accounts say that Antanum was recruited by Ingkun early on from a tribe along the neighboring river, the Talog River, to oversee the construction of the fort. Construction took two full years. Company records of patrols around this time note the strange occurrence of empty villages, and these were probably those that had voluntarily joined in the construction of the fort. This fort appeared on a hill, overlooking the Silangit River, Ingkun's dominion. According to British accounts, several Dyak traders saw the fort and realized that this could be the headquarters from which to launch a rebellion.

=== Battle at Tagul River ===
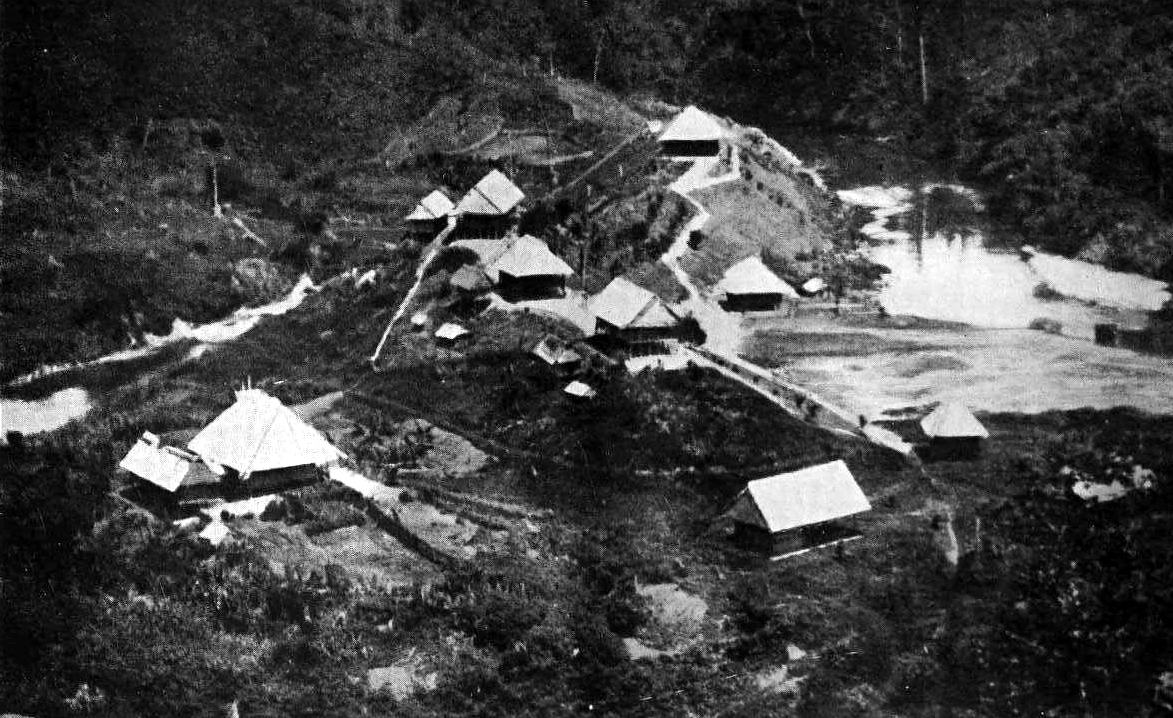
Despite being completely burned in 1915, with tensions ramping-up in Europe, Pensiangan Station was rebuilt after the war to monitor the Dutch border. It was known as the "remotest outstation in North Borneo."

On 13 February 1915, Noel Baboneau, the District Officer, was in a small company marching along the Tagul River toward Pensiangan to oversee the construction of a new station there. Ingkun, leading a band of Murut tribesmen hidden within the jungle, opened fire on Baboneau's men.

The Constabulary returned fire, but they had trouble locating the source of the bullets. Baboneau's Chinese baggage carriers ran away, his orderly fell dead at his feet, and another member of the Constabulary was wounded. His men were nearly depleted of ammunition by the time Baboneau sounded the call to retreat. They had to cut away at the thick jungle until they reached a boat on the river to regroup at Pensiangan Station.

At Rundum, Lieutenant Corporal Impenit, upon hearing that Baboneau had been attacked, took five members of the Constabulary out to look for him.

Inkgun's men, however, were already marching to attack Pensiangan Station. Baboneau issued the order to abandon the station and make for Rundum and the District Headquarters. On 15 February, they left the station at daybreak. They arrested a Murut chief named Kawah on the march and employed him as a guide to circumnavigate the main track, but he escaped soon after. For the next three days, the party of Constabulary – eleven policemen, four of their wives, Baboneau and his servants – marched through hostile territory in the jungles of Borneo.

When Impenit's small force arrived at Pensiangan Station, they found it raised to the ground, burned down to ash and rubble. Seeing that Baboneau was not here, they investigated and returned to Rundum.

=== Battle of Rundum ===
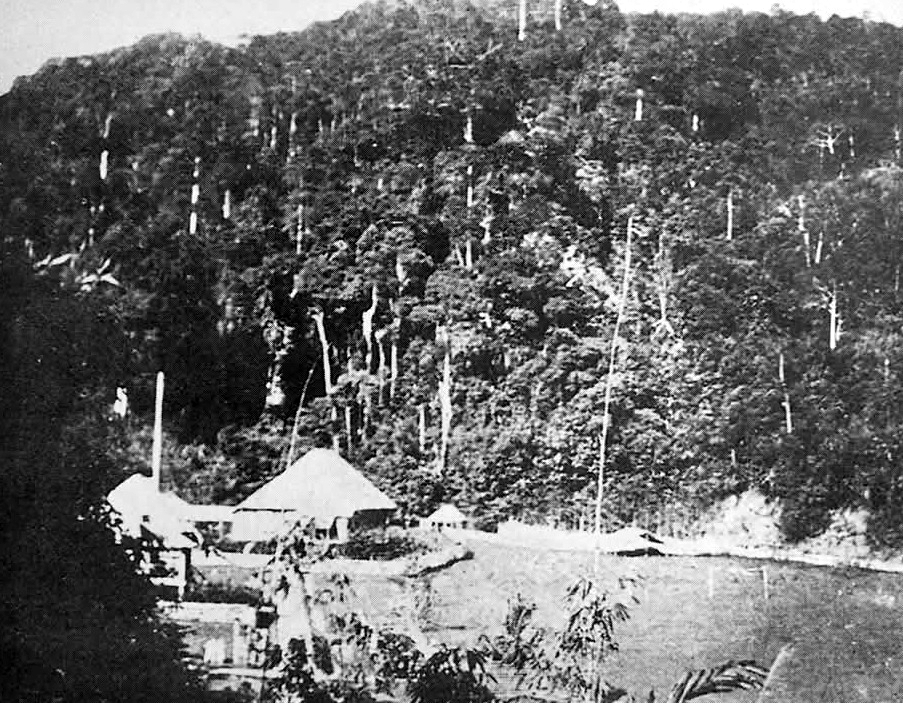
The Rundum Station, as it appeared in 1915, surrounded on all sides by dense jungle.

At Rundum, with the Constabulary regrouped, they were three days from any other town. Their only form of communication was a recently installed telephone line, which kept getting cut by rebel scouts. Baboneau tried to convince headquarters to send major reinforcements, but they did not believe his reports. C. H. Pearson reinforced the station with a small force of Sikh Constabulary commanded by Jemadar Akhbar Khan. The garrison remained on high alert.

Ingkun had recruited every single resident in the entire district to take up arms against the Company, a total of 60 villages, with thousands of soldiers readying for a major assault on Rundum. It took nineteen days for the rebels to make their first move.

On 6 March, just before dawn, the Constabulary sentry's alert sounded that movement had been spotted in the jungle.

Ingkun's men charged at the fort, at least a thousand of these men yelling war cries as they did. They were equipped with spears, swords, blowpipes, pistols, and rifles.

The Constabulary – outnumbered approximately 1 to 100 – maintained constant and steady weapons fire, and were able to keep the rebels from reaching the station, forcing them down into a riverbed. Jedmar Khan instructed a three-man squad to move along the river bank and flank the rebels there. This tactic worked, and the rebels retreated from the river.

For two hours, the rebels and the Constabulary were then engaged in a sustained firefight.

At 10am, Ingkun's men attempted another wave of attack, moving from the opposite direction near the town's shops. Along the way, they burned and looted the Chinese-run storefronts of Rundum. This attack, however, was also unsuccessful, and they were forced to retreat once again. They regrouped at Ingkun's fortress.

Another small reinforcement of 24 men arrived from Tenom. This was not enough to launch a counterattack.

While the Constabulary reported only one wounded man, after counting the dead, the official Company report stated that 20 rebels were killed. The Rundum Rebels, however, officially stated that their number of dead was 200. The Company may have accidentally left off a zero on their report. Another source, however, states that the rebel dead here numbered 13, with 20 wounded.

Ingkun's body was also found among the dead.

=== Antanom the Warrior ===
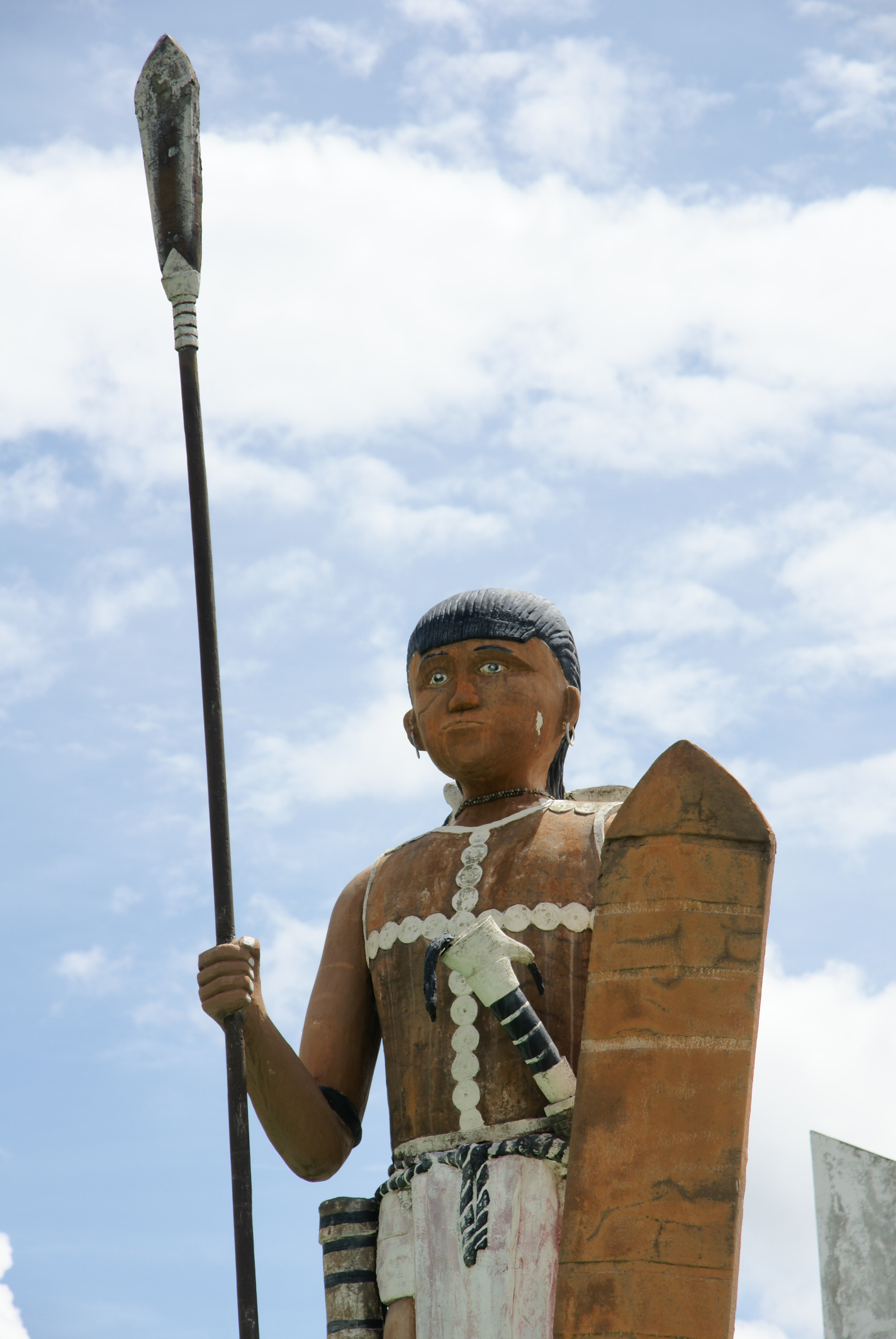
Antanom took over leadership of the Rebellion when Ingkun died.

When Ingkun died, the leader of the rebellion de-facto became another Murut warrior named Antanum, who had been responsible for recruiting several hundred soldiers on his own. Some sources altogether leave-out Ingkun's contributions to the Rebellion, and assume that Antanum was the sole chieftan of the war.

Ingkun's fort was on a hill near his birthplace on the Silangit River, a two-day march from Rundum.

Resident Henry William Lisbrian Bunbury wrote in his official dispatch:

"The fort consisted of seven underground houses, closely connected with each other ; in the case of one at least the central passage had rooms leading out of it dug out of the sides. The earth so excavated was piled up to either side, and over it a roof of bamboo, earth and wood was placed. In addition to these underground houses were many bamboo atap huts with pits dug under them and loopholes covering the approaches. The hill slopes were guarded with udang and sudah (long and short sharpened stakes) thickly planted, a fence, and innumerable loopholes."

The earthworks behind the fort extended three hundred yards, and a covered trench allowed the rebels to access a small stream. At the fort, the rebels included several paid Company employees who had previously been recruited by the Company, and then decided to join the rebellion.

=== Battle at the Fort of Ingkun and Antanum ===
On 9 April 1915, a Constabulary expedition commanded by H. W. L. Bunbury, C. H. Pearson, and R. R. M. Tabuteau, left Rundum marching toward Ingkun's fort. This expedition contained 15 Sikh Constabulary, 10 local Constabulary, 70 Dyak warriors, several native chiefs, 300 baggage carriers, and a 7-Pounder. They reached the fort on 13 April 1915 and reconnoitered the area. Scouts were sent to mark paths to the fort to avoid the traps, and the rebel water supply was cut-off.

On 14 April, the Constabulary opened fire on the fort with the 7-Pounder from 200 yards. Antanum's men returned fire with a large bore muzzle-loader gun, pelting the sky with nails, discarded wire, stones, and other sharp metal objects.

On the night of 15 April, about 300 rebels escaped the fort under the cover of a heavy rainstorm.

On 17 April, white flags were raised over the fort. Two government-appointed chiefs went into the fort to persuade the occupants to formally give up arms.

==== Death of Antanum ====
Antanum and two of his Lieutenants walked into the Company's encampment to negotiate surrender, but they were arrested on the spot instead. Antanum attempted to escape, but he was recaptured. The three men were then immediately executed. Seeing that their leaders had been executed instead of being allowed to surrender, the fort went back into combat alert.

On 18 April, the Constabulary set fire to several of the bamboo structures surrounding the fort. The fire forced hundreds of the fort's occupants to attempt to flee, but the Constabulary were camped along the escape routes and fired weapons on the fleeing warriors, killing many of them. Seventy members of the Company were wounded in this exchange.

That night, those who had escaped the fire then attacked the Company's formation at random and organized intervals, maneuvering around the Company pickets.

On 19 April, H. W. L. Bunbury declared the mission a success. On 29 April, the remaining occupants of the fort were told to walk to Rundum and surrender. They didn't do that, but they did stop fighting.

=== Rebellion continued ===
Late in the month of April, 8 telegraph lineworkers were murdered by the denizens of Mesopo, and they threatened to attack the station in Keningau.

The first real surrenders of the rebellion occurred in September 1915, when the Rebellion finally came to an end.

=== Aftermath ===
Almost immediately after these events, the Constabulary were forced to march to the Tempassuk district to put down another rebellion that had arisen there at the command of some lllanun and Bajau warriors. There would not be another Murut rebellion against Company rule.
