= Blayong Rebellion =

Uprising against British rule in North Borneo (1914)

Date	1914
Location	North Borneo
Result	Company victory, Blayong surrendered; Sparked the Rundum Rebellion

Belligerents
Tagol Murut tribe	North Borneo Chartered Company

Commanders and leaders
Blayong; Siluang	(North Borneo) Henry William Lisbrian Bunbury; (North Borneo) Noel Blake Baboneau; (North Borneo) Charles Herbert Harington

Units involved
Blayong's Rebels	British North Borneo Constabulary

The Blayong Rebellion, also known as Blayong's Revolt, was an armed resistance against the rule of the North Borneo Chartered Company in North Borneo (present day Sabah).

== History ==
=== Background ===
Blayong (also spelled Belayong) was a chief of the Tagol tribe (also spelled Tahol or Tagal) from the Tagol River in the Pensiangan region. He appears in the judicial records of North Borneo in the early 1910s as a fierce Murut headhunter.

In 1913, the North Borneo Chartered Company introduced the Landang Ordinance, a tax on Landang products. This prohibited indigenous tribes from managing their own forests for the production of native palm wine – a privilege which they had previously maintained for thousands of years.

"The Company," as it was known, also began the construction of an inland bridle path near Tagol territory to travel between Pensiangan and Rundum, pressing many of their members into service as indentured coolies for its construction, which was a common practice for the Company in this era – especially using the ceremonial oaths of conquered chiefs to enlist hard labour of their tribes.

Despite the fact that slavery by this time was outlawed, and that the court of directors of the Company presumed themselves to be campaigners against slavery; they nevertheless pressed local tribes into indentured servitude – building telegraph and telephone lines, roads, train tracks, and other infrastructure in the interior highlands of North Borneo. These local tribes believed that this work was unworthy of them; and preferred when this work had been performed by Chinese and other immigrant laborers.

Blayong initially refused to allow his tribe to be conscripted into the service of the bridle path or any road construction. He was told by the company, however, that if he or his men refused to work on building the road, they would be held in contempt of Company law and sent to prison. This bridle path, however, was supposed to go straight through solid rock – work which would have meant the use of pickaxes and rudimentary steam-tools to chissel away and form a path.

Blayong was brought with the men of his tribe to a construction site on the crossroads at Kemabong, but they had no intention of working on the road. Here, they staged a walkout. They left their tools on the ground and went back home and started the preparations for war. They built a fort in Bukit Ulu Tagol.

=== War ===
The Company then labeled Blayong as an enemy of the state. Resident Henry William Lisbrian Bunbury led went on a punitive expedition into Tagol territory, leading the British North Borneo Constabulary to burn the homes of those loyal to Blayong. Notably, they also burned the home of a man named Siluang.

On June 17, 1914, the Constabulary attempted a failed assault on the Blayong's fort. Blayong's Rebels reported no injuries, and they moved into the jungles. The Constabulary, led by Bunbury, destroyed the fort.

The Constabulary attempted to track them into the jungle. They interviewed the chiefs of the Semakir, Lembuku and Mukang tribes, but none of them admitted a relationship with Blayong. In this era, Murut Longhouses could house up to 200 people in the same building, and the Constabulary burned so many of them that Blayong, in order to avoid more destruction, surrendered his forces and weapons.

Resident J. Maxwell Hall observed the Planting of the Stone with Blayong. In 1919, he wrote of Blayong:

"When late in the night I inaugurated a dozen or more jars of native liquor, and peered into Blayong's face across the top of one of them, his dark eyes shone clear in the torchlight, full of humour and courage, and I knew then that he would meet his fate boldly when it came."

=== Aftermath ===
The company's response to Blayong's walkout proved to the Murut and Dusun tribes of North Borneo's inland areas that their way of life was truly threatened. Blayong's revolt against Company rule inspired the Muruts named Ingkun and Antanum to launch the massive Rundum Rebellion.
