= Noël Baboneau =

Government administrator in North Borneo (1884–1920)

Noël Blake Baboneau

Personal details
- Born: 23 December 1884 Chinsurah, Bengal, British Raj
- Died: 6 December 1920 (aged 35) Tambunan District, North Borneo
- Parent: J. T. Baboneau
- Education: Brighton College

Military service
- Unit: Essex Regiment
- Battles/wars: Blayong Rebellion; Rundum Rebellion; World War I; Battle of the Ancre

Noël Blake Baboneau was a British soldier who served in the administrative government of North Borneo (present day Sabah) for the North Borneo Chartered Company.

== Biography ==
=== Early life ===
Noël Baboneau was born in Chinsurah, Bengal, British Raj, in 1884, the son of J. T. Baboneau. His parents sent him to the boarding school at Brighton College, where he maintained a sporting career. In April 1903, Baboneau placed third in the flat race with a time of 5 minutes 18.65 seconds. In October 1903, Baboneau played half-backs in The Football League for Brighton in a losing game against the "Dolphins."

=== North Borneo ===
Baboneau first arrived in North Borneo in 1910, where he entered into the Cadet Service of North Borneo as a Cadet alongside Owen Rutter and E. A. Pearson. In September 1910, they graduated from the Cadet Service and entered into the Civil Service of North Borneo, and Baboneau was made a Magistrate Third Class.

In the Charter Day celebrations for the year 1911, Baboneau was promoted to District Officer for the Mempakul District.

In August 1915, Baboneau was made District Officer for the Tambunan District.

=== Blayong Rebellion ===
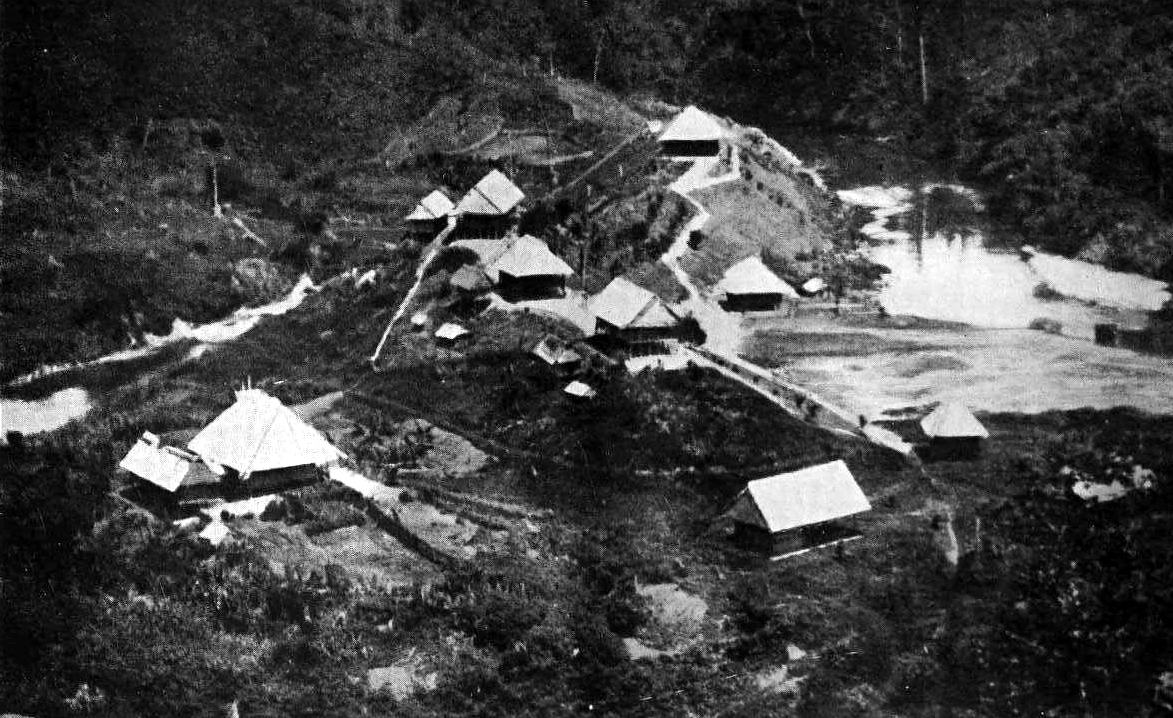
The Pensiangan Station was called the "remotest outstation in North Borneo."

In 1914, the Company was in the process of constructing bridle paths into the interior of Borneo. One of these saddle roads was to be constructed between Rundum and Pensiangan, which was at that time called the "remotest outpost in North Borneo." By this point, most of the government civil service officers stationed in the Interior (including Baboneau) had sent letters of concern to the Governor of North Borneo about the sheer demands that the Company was expecting in manual labour from the indigenous population to construct the network of bridle paths, telegraphy and telephone lines, and other construction projects there. Most of the local tribes were disgruntled with the tasks - the Resident at Tenom, Resident H.W.L. Bunbury, however, did not take their labour demands seriously.

In June 1914, the chief of the Tagol tribe, Blayong, launched the Blayong Rebellion. The Blayong Rebels first staged a walkout after being asked to carve their portion of the bridle path through solid rock, and then moved into the jungles to build a fort in Blayong's hometown from which to stage a rebellion.

Baboneau was ordered to take a small detachment of the British North Borneo Constabulary - the country's only military and police force - to capture or kill Blayong. They destroyed the fort, but Blayong escaped. Eventually, however, he was caught and submitted to Company rule with a Planting of the Stone.

=== Rundum Rebellion ===
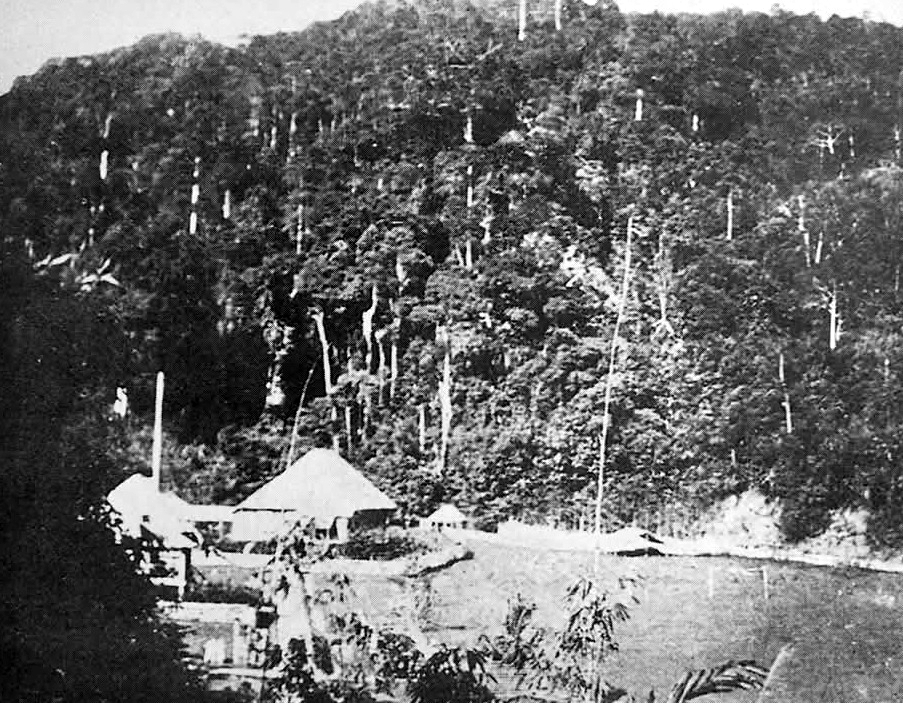
The station at Rundum.

By November 1914, after a long drought had broken, leaving most of the locals of the interior without food from the harvest season - many of the locals believed that the gods of the earth had become angry with the Company and were taking their revenge on them through the drought. Baboneau, touring the interior districts, had become confused at the emptied villages along his route.

In February, Baboneau was on a patrol with members of the Constabulary, and they were ambushed from all sides by sniper fire. Not knowing which direction the sniper fire was coming from, Baboneau and his men retreated to the Rundum station. This was the first moment of the Rundum Rebellion, the single-largest indigenous uprising against Company rule in the history of North Borneo. Baboneau, and his men, were then surrounded on all sides and outnumbered by several thousand indigenous soldiers and had to fight just to survive.

=== World War I ===
During World War I, Baboneau took leave from the government of North Borneo to join the Essex Regiment and fight in Europe. He was entered into the Officers training Corps in 1915. In his unit, they nicknamed him Borneo. He fought alongside several other members of the North Borneo Civil Service, including Mr. Tabuteau at the Battle of the Ancre.

In September 1917, Baboneau was sent to the hospital in Blighty to recover from trench fever that he'd contracted on the continent.

Baboneau returned to North Borneo in February 1918.

=== Death ===
In November 1919, Baboneau took the position of District Officer for Province Clarke, which had previously been held by George Cathcart Woolley.

On 6 December 1920, Baboneau played a game of golf. After the game, he walked to the police station to make a telephone call to the station at Keningau. Either during the phone call, or shortly after the phone call, the police constable assigned to office guard duty that day - badge number P.C. 420 Lima - pulled out his service weapon and shot Baboneau in the back of the neck. He died instantaneously.

Constable Lima then walked - either to Baboneau's home, or his own - and shot himself in the head, dying on the floor.

Several sources made the claim that there was "no reason" for the murder. George Cathcart Woolley made the claim in his own diaries that were published posthumously that the guard had been upset about the Company's law against bigamy. The London and China Telegraph, wrote: "The cause of the murder was mutiny pure and simple. Private Lima enlisted at Tauran two years ago as a married man. He was desirous of marrying another woman of the neighbouring village, Lintun, but such a marriage would have been against all Police Regulations, and permission, therefore, was apparently refused."

== Dates of rank ==
Date	Rank	Unit	Ref.
8 December 1916	2nd Lieutenant	Essex Regiment	
25 December 1918	Lieutenant	Essex Regiment	

== Written works ==
- A Murut Vocabulary, Journal of the Straits Branch of the Royal Asiatic Society, 86: 343-375; with an introductory note by G.C. Woolley. (Written posthumously).
