= Mount Antulai =

Mountain in Sabah, Malaysia

- Mount Antulai
- Location within Borneo

Highest point
- Elevation: 1,713 m (5,620 ft)
- Parent peak: Witti Range
- Coordinates: 4°40′36″N 116°20′51″E

Geography
- Location: Nabawan District, Interior Division, Sabah
- Country: Malaysia

Mount Antulai is a mountain in the Malaysian state of Sabah. It was located in the Nabawan District of the Interior Division, near Sapulut. Its highest peak is 1,713 metres (5,620.1 ft).

== Geography ==
Mount Antulai is located in the Nabawan District of Interior Division. The terrain around Mount Antulai is predominantly mountainous, which ranging by the Witti Mountains. There are approximately 4 people per square kilometer in the vicinity of Mount Antulai, a population density classified as sparse. The area surrounding Mount Antulai is almost entirely covered by forest.

== Climate ==
The climate in the Mount Antulai area is equatorial (Af). The average temperature is 20 °C (68.0 °F). April is the hottest month in this area, with temperatures reaching 21 °C (69.8 °F). December is categorized as the coldest month, at 18 °C (64.4 °F). The average annual rainfall is 3,760 millimeters (148.0 in). Rainfall is heaviest in May, with 395 millimeters (15.6 in), while the month with the least rainfall is June, with 234 millimeters (9.2 in).

Mount Antulai

Climate chart (precipitation, max. and min. temperature)
J	F	M	A	M	J	J	A	S	O	N	D
299 21 17	298 22 18	259 22 19	372 22 20	395 22 18	234 22 18	316 21 19	320 21 18	294 22 18	288 22 18	359 20 19	328 20 17
- █ Average max. and min. temperatures in °C
- █ Precipitation totals in mm
Imperial conversion
J	F	M	A	M	J	J	A	S	O	N	D
12 70 63	12 72 64	10 72 66	15 72 68	16 72 64	9.2 72 64	12 70 66	13 70 64	12 72 64	11 72 64	14 68 66	13 68 63
- █ Average max. and min. temperatures in °F
- █ Precipitation totals in inches
