= Malingkote =

Violent religious movement in North Borneo (1891–1892)

- Classification: Indigenous religion; Religious movement; Destructive cult
- Orientation: Animism; Anti-Colonialism; Xenophobia; Nationalism
- Theology: Momolianism
- Territory: Sapulut, North Borneo
- Founder: Tahang

Malingkote or the Cult of Malingkote was a religious movement in the interior Murut regions of North Borneo (present day Sabah) in 1891, which lasted for roughly a year. It was a radically violent, anti-Colonial and xenophobic offshoot of the Murut indigenous religion of Momolianism. The leader of Malingkote was the warrior Tahang, recognized as a controversial hero of Sabah, who with the Sepulote Murut led the Malingkote Revolt, which was responsible for the murder of at least 21 known foreigners, among other destructive acts. The foreign persons killed were themselves South Asian, transplanted from different countries in the region, but still considered taxpaying subjects of the British protectorate.

== History ==
Malingkote Revolt
- Date: 1891–1892
- Location: North Borneo

Parties
Malingkotists	North Borneo Chartered Company

Lead figures
Tahang	Governor of North Borneo

Casualties
- Death: At least 21 known foreign settlers

In 1891, the Sepulote Murut warrior Tahang became ill with fever and bedridden. One night, Tahang had a prophetic dream where he was visited by an angel, or Malikot. In the dream, Malikot told him that if he performed certain ceremonies and tasks, the gods would grant him supernatural abilities, including invulnerability to harm or bullets, the ability to raise the dead, immortality, and the ability to fly.

When Tahang awoke the next morning, he told the villagers of Sepulote that Malikot had promised that if they followed him, they too would be granted supernatural abilities. In the Murut religion of Momolianism, this was not entirely irregular, as it was commonly believed that these abilities were real, and that prophets were visited by angels.

However, in this case, the angel had demanded extreme violence of Tahang and his followers. Tahang said that the angel wanted them to destroy their crops, kill their animals, salt the earth, and kill any foreigner they met. Within weeks, the entire village of Sepulote had been converted to Malinkote, becoming Tahang's first disciples.

These Malingkotists went out from Sepulote into the country, bringing their faith to other Murut villages and towns. When they arrived in the new villages, they brought with them the same message and the promise of supernatural abilities granted by the gods. Malingkote quickly spread along the Padas Gorge, up to Pegalan, and into the Keningau Plain. They also went into Papar and Putatan. It also spread eastward towards the headwaters of the Sugut River and Labuk River. Those who resisted conversion to Malingkote were told that if they did not convert, the gods would strike them to death with thunderbolts, and their houses would be destroyed.

The Malingkote followers neglected their crops, destroyed their animals, and gave away their property. At least 21 foreigners were also killed by the Malingkotists, including Dusun, Brunei, Dayak, Chinese and other Murut who had resisted conversion.

In 1894, Henry Wise wrote that the belief of the Malingkotists was so strong that:

"It is reported also that one man climbed up into a cocoanut-palm to fly, apparently under the impression that his wings would develope before he reached the ground. They did not do so, and his leg was broken by the fall."

The government of North Borneo, and the Board of Directors of the North Borneo Chartered Company became increasingly worried that the Malingkote would result in a massive famine in the country. They declared Malingkote an enemy of the realm, and launched expeditions to bring the country back under control.

One group of fanatical Malingkotists famously told J.G. Wheatley that they would surrender: "when the orang puteh are able to grow dollars on trees." Much of the cult was collapsed after only several months, but it maintained a presence in the core areas into early 1892.

== See also ==
- Rundum Rebellion
