= Antanum =

Murut warrior from North Borneo (1885–1915)

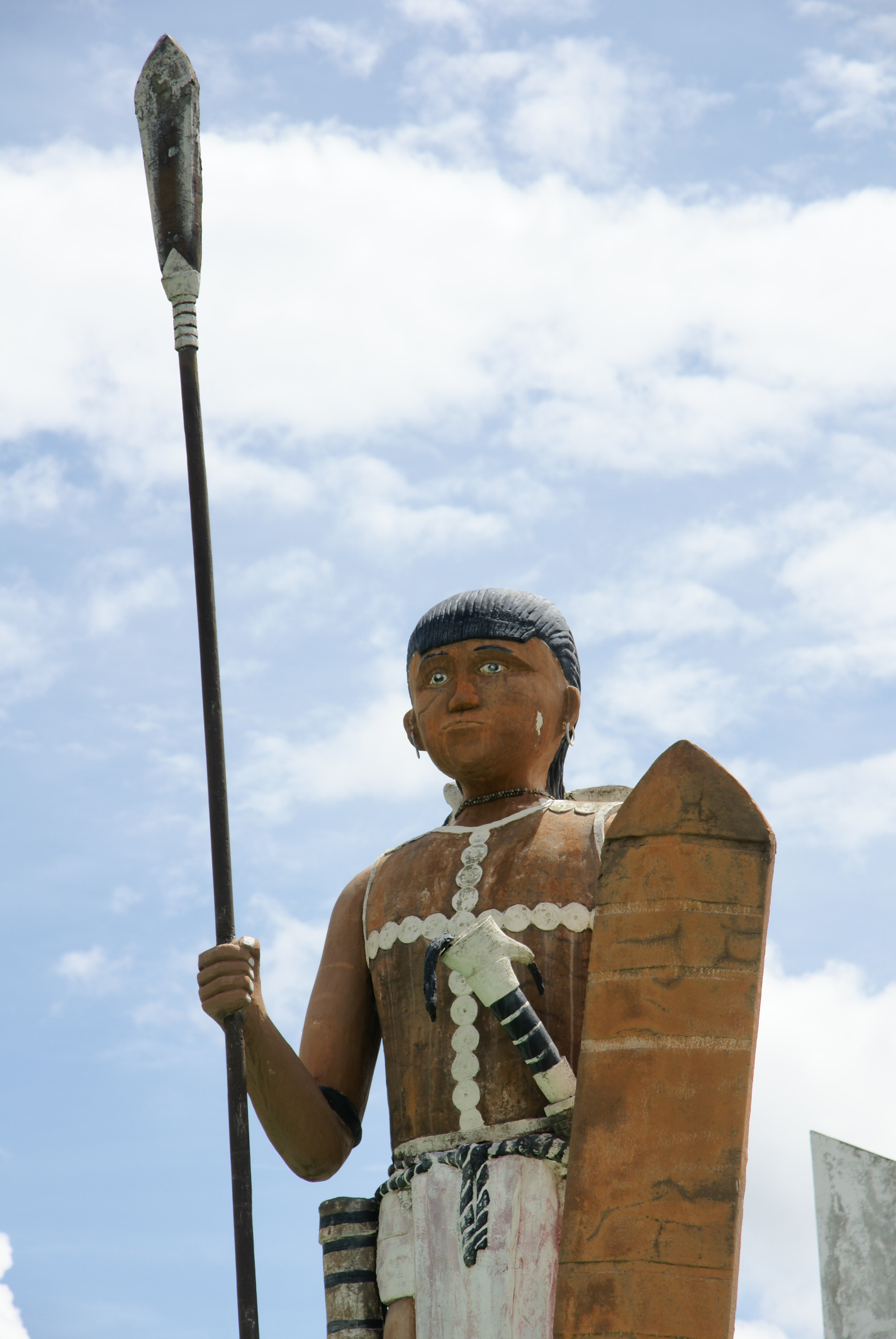
- Statue of Antanom in Tenom. (There is no known existing photo of Antanom).
- Preceded by: Inkgun

Personal details
- Born: 1885 Salarom River, Masinpunon, Rundum, North Borneo, Borneo
- Died: 1915 (aged 29–30)
- Parent: Endoi

Military service
- Rank: Commander-in-chief
- Battles/wars: Rundum Rebellion

Ontoros Antanom, also known as Antanum or Antanom (1885–1915) was a Murut warrior from North Borneo who led a rebellion against the North Borneo Chartered Company (NBCC). Believed to have supernatural powers, he united several Murut chiefs from Keningau, Tenom, Pensiangan and Rundum in opposing the policies of the NBCC in North Borneo and launched the Rundum Rebellion in 1915. The rebellion was immediately suppressed by the company, and the conflict led to a heavy death toll amongst the Murut.

== Early life ==
Ontroros bin Endoi was born in the Masinpunon area, along the Salarom River. He was a member of the Murut Tagol speaking tribes. However, as it has been noted by the researcher Callistus Fernandez at the National University of Singapore:

"The use of the term Tagol Murut to include all Muruts in Nabawan-Pensiangan, Tenom, Sipitang and Keningau is a linguistic categorization. This categorization cannot be applied to the Muruts of 1915. Firstly, they were river-based - meaning that every tribe was associated with a river and took the name of the river as their source of identity."

His father was Endoi, another member of the tribe. He grew up in the Rundum region of Tenom District. His early life was mostly that of a hunter-gatherer, living within the traditional customs of his tribe. He was trained from an early age to become a kalawon (warrior).

== Rundum Rebellion ==
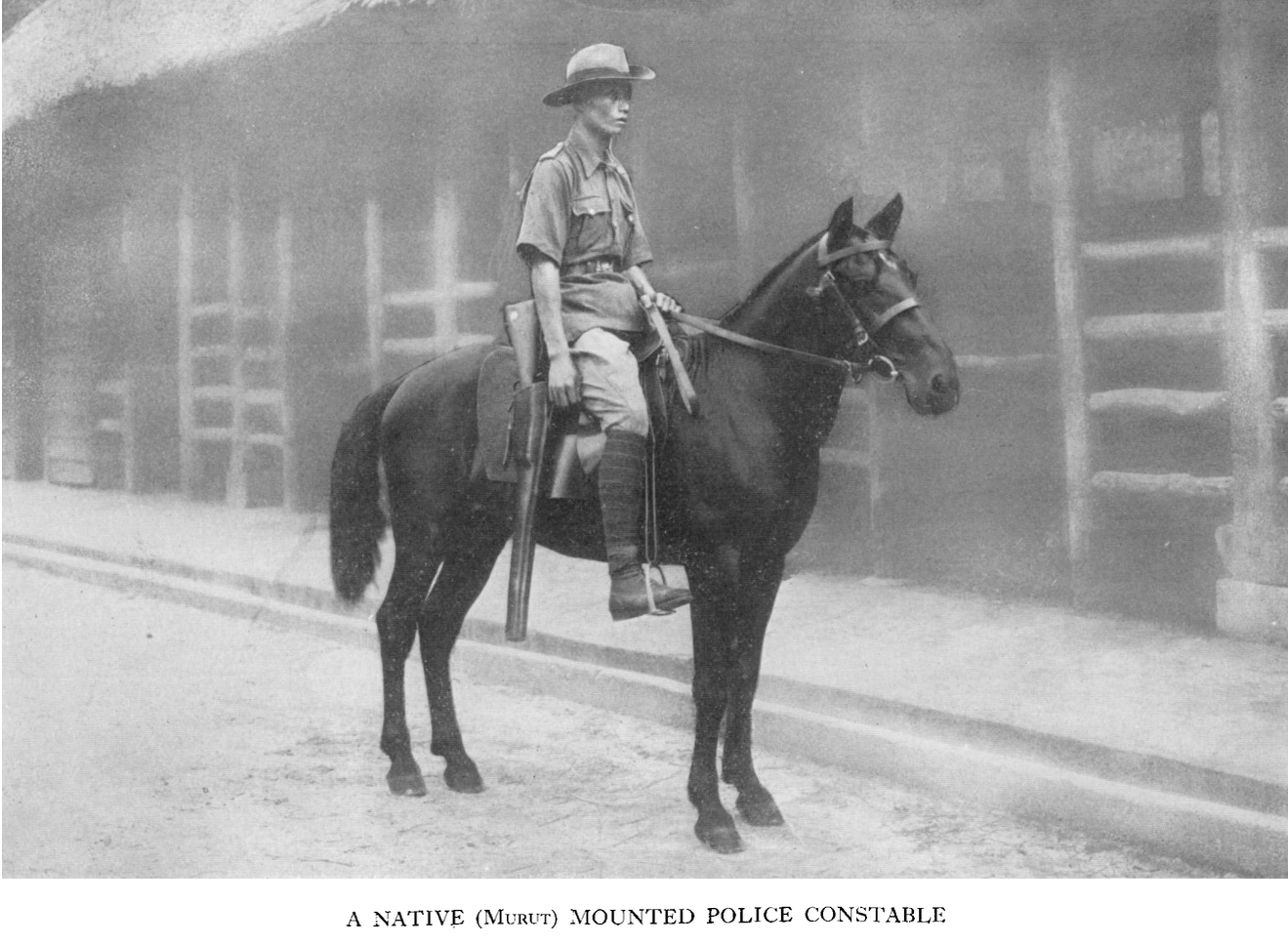
There was a large contingent of Murut in the British North Borneo Constabulary by this point, who fought hard in the campaign against Antanum.

Under the administration of North Borneo Chartered Company (NBCC), municipal administration was governed by the Village Ordinance of 1891. This ordinance fundamentally changed the status of the chiefs, the traditional indigenous tribal leaders in the region. Following its implementation, the NBCC only accepted those chiefs whom it had appointed as community leaders. Other chieftains, who had played an important role for generations, were either shut down or branded as criminals or troublemakers. Exclusion of these traditional leaders contributed to the decision of Antanum to rebel against the company.

Claiming to have supernatural powers, he united several Murut chiefs from Keningau, Tenom, Pensiangan and Rundum in opposing the policies of the NBCC in North Borneo and launched the Rundum Rebellion in 1915. Hundreds of Murut rebels successfully attacked the company administration building, and Antanum ordered the construction of underground tunnels to aid his fellow rebels during the rebellion.

In response, the company sent 400 soldiers from the British North Borneo Constabulary, including the Constabulary's Murut Police (there were between 50 and 100 Murut in the Constabulary at this point), equipped with firearms to counterattack in April 1915. Though the Muruts were only using primitive weapons such as blowguns, swords and spears, the company's soldiers failed to defeat them. Subsequently, they decided to lay a trap for Antanum; inviting him to a peace conference at Rundum. When he and his followers were on their way to the conference, they were surrounded by hundreds of company soldiers and arrested. Antanum was eventually executed, bringing an end to his resistance.
