= Witti Mountains =

Mountain range in Malaysia

- Witti Range
- Location within Borneo

Highest point
- Peak: Mount Antulai
- Elevation: 1,713 m (5,620 ft)
- Coordinates: 5°11′01.1″N 116°28′57.3″E

Naming
- Etymology: Franz Xaver Witt
- Native name: Banjaran Witti (Malay)

Geography
- Countries: Malaysia and Indonesia
- States: Sabah and North Kalimantan
- Division: Interior Division and Sandakan Division
- District: Keningau; Nabawan; Sook; Tenom; Tongod

Witti Mountains or Witti Range, is a mountain ranges in the Interior Division of Sabah, Malaysia. It was named after Franz Xaver Witt. The mountain range is also separated from Sabah's two primary mountain range, being the Crocker Mountains to the west, and Trusmadi Range to the northeast.

== Geology ==
Witti Range is made up of rugged mountain terrain, built from the sandstones and shales of the Crocker Formation, alongside the mudstones, greywackes, and conglomerates of the Sapulut Formation. Witti Range almost consist with all forest reserve, with some are mostly covered with logging trail from rolling hills, with surrounding palm trees. Nearby river included Sook River, Punti River, Padas River and Pegalan River. It ranges to certain district in Sabah like Tenom, Nabawan, Keningau, Sook and Tongod, and also entered part of North Kalimantan of Indonesia.

== Biodiversity ==
Witti Range consists of certain floral and faunal within its deep forest and highlands.
