= Sapulut =

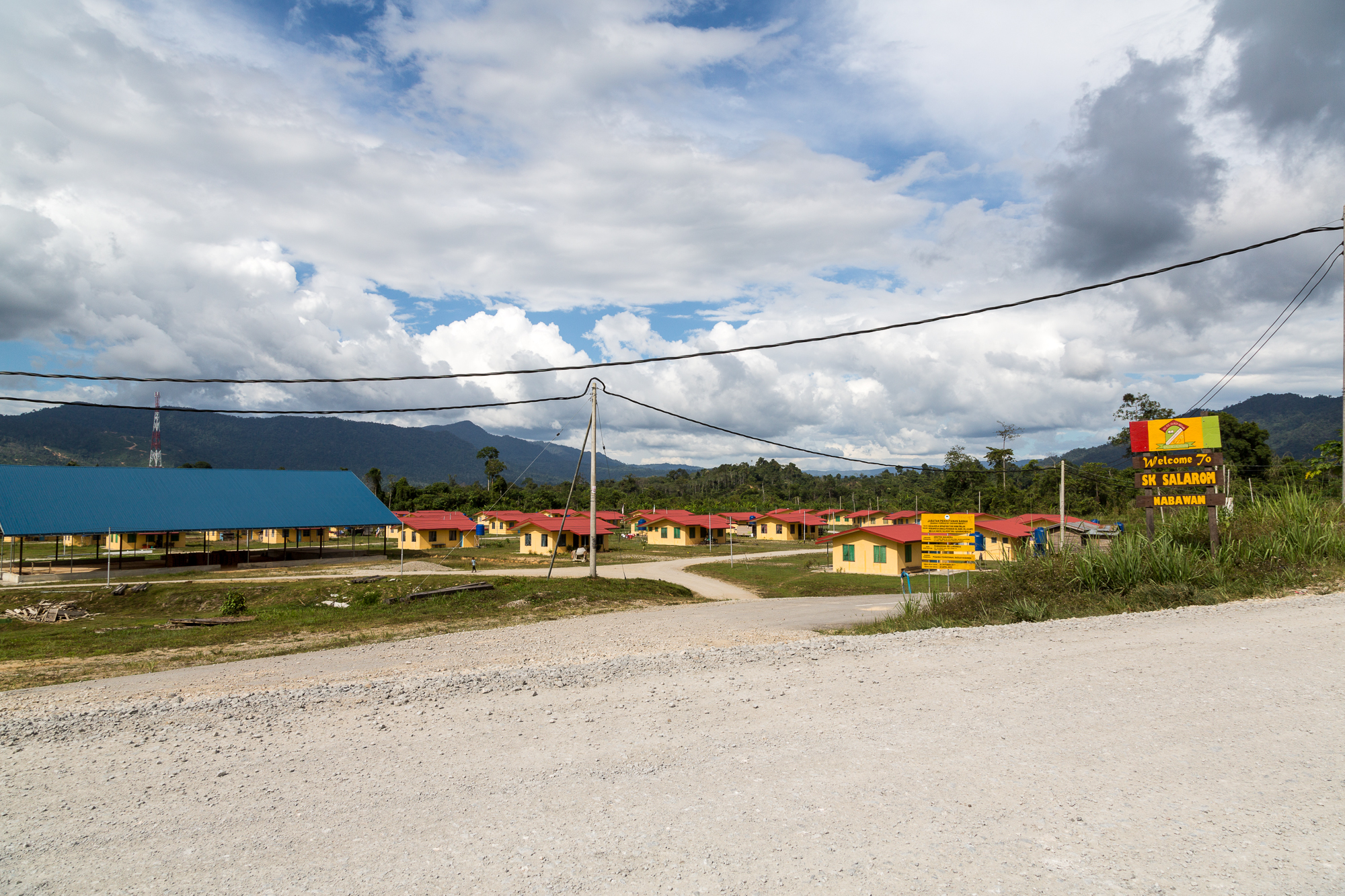
- New houses in Sapulut

- Location within Borneo
- Coordinates: 4°42′0″N 116°29′0″E
- Country: Malaysia
- State: Sabah
- District: Nabawan
- Division: Interior
- Elevation: 400 m (1,300 ft)
- Highest elevation: 1,713 m (5,620 ft)

Population
  - Total: 3,000

Sapulut is a town and mukim, along Sapulut River in the Nabawan District, of the upper Interior Division of Sabah, Malaysia. A nearby mountain, which is named Mount Antulai, is located about 5 kilometres (3.1 mi) from the town. Nearby the town is the Batu Punggul limestone massif and cave, a popular spot for eco-tourists. The town main route is the Tawau–Keningau Highway.

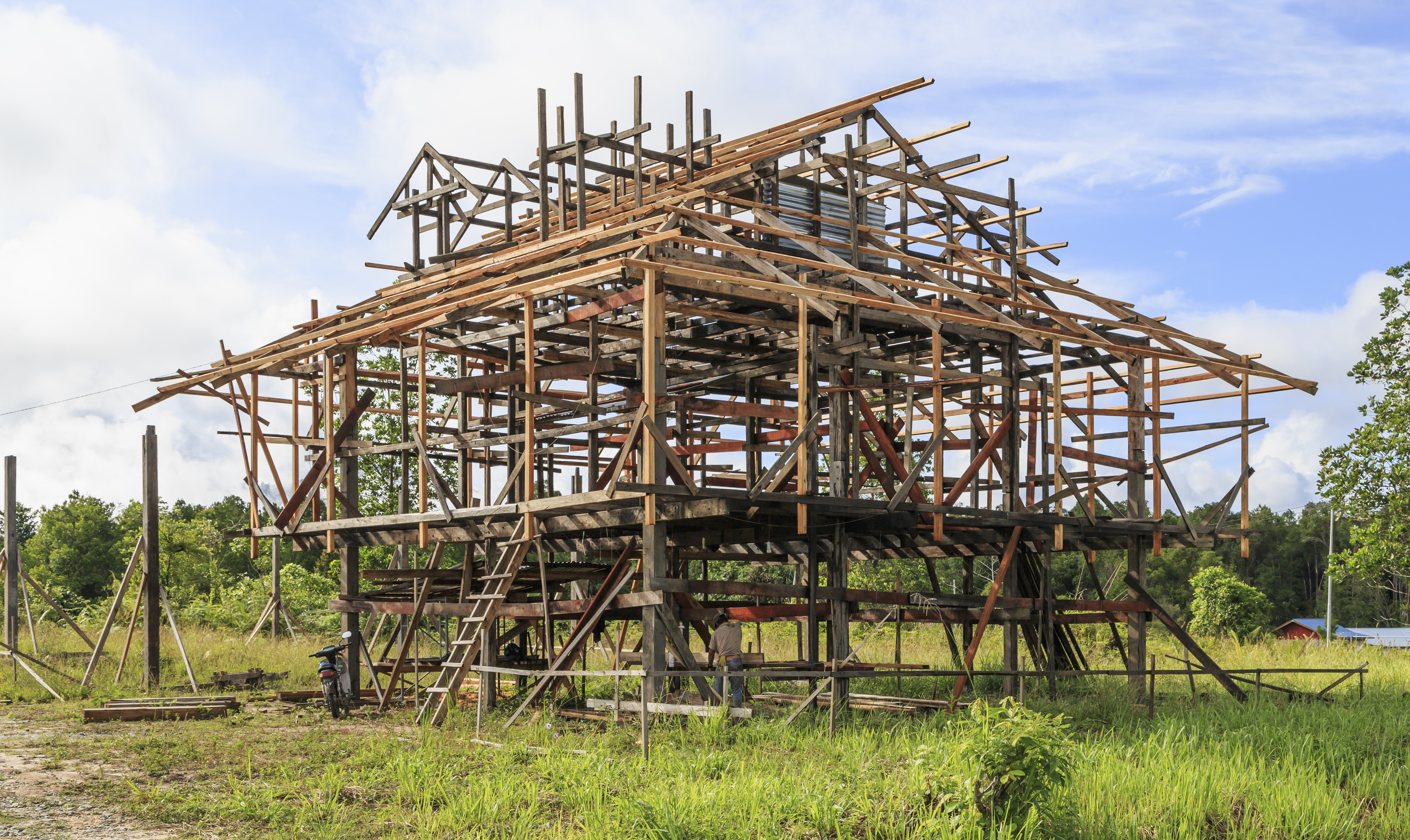
A traditional house being built in Sapulut

Sapulut was also planned to upgrade to a sub-district as proposal in January 2019, though it requires strict thresholds. In 2026, the road to Pensiangan, along Salong and Pagalungan was upgraded to a paved road.
