= Mount Madai =

Small mountain in Malaysia

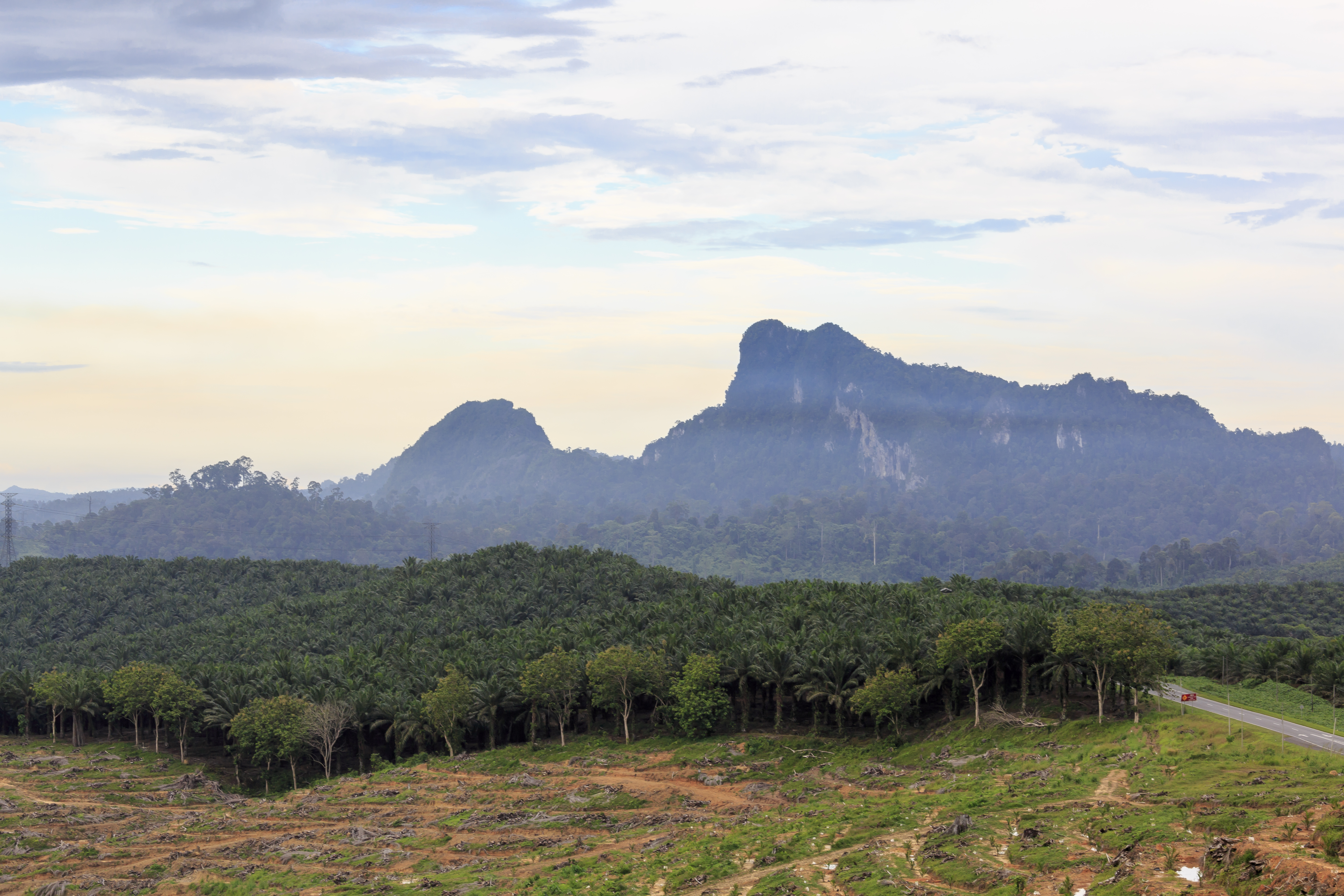
- View of Mount Madai.

Highest point
- Elevation: 319 m (1,047 ft)
- Coordinates: 4°43′12″N 118°08′54″E

Geography
- Location within Malaysia
- Location: Tawau Division, Sabah

Geology
- Mountain type: Inselberg

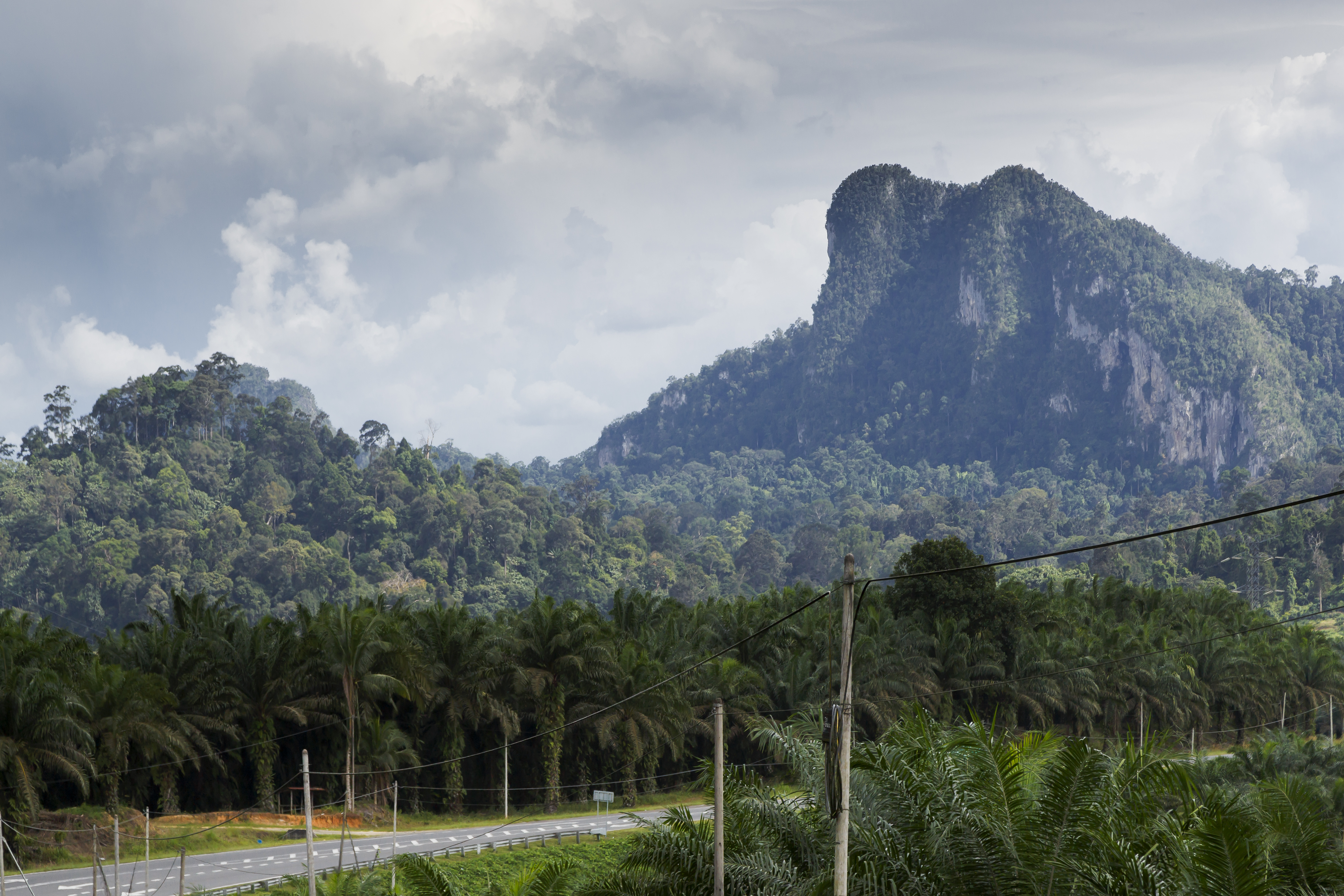
Mount Madai taken from the road in Kunak District

Mount Madai (Malay: Gunung Madai) is an inselberg in Kunak District, Tawau Division, Sabah, Malaysia. The summit is 319 m above sea level. It has an approximate width 1 kilometre (0.6 mi).
