= Nabawan =

Nabawan Pekan Nabawan
- Town and district capital
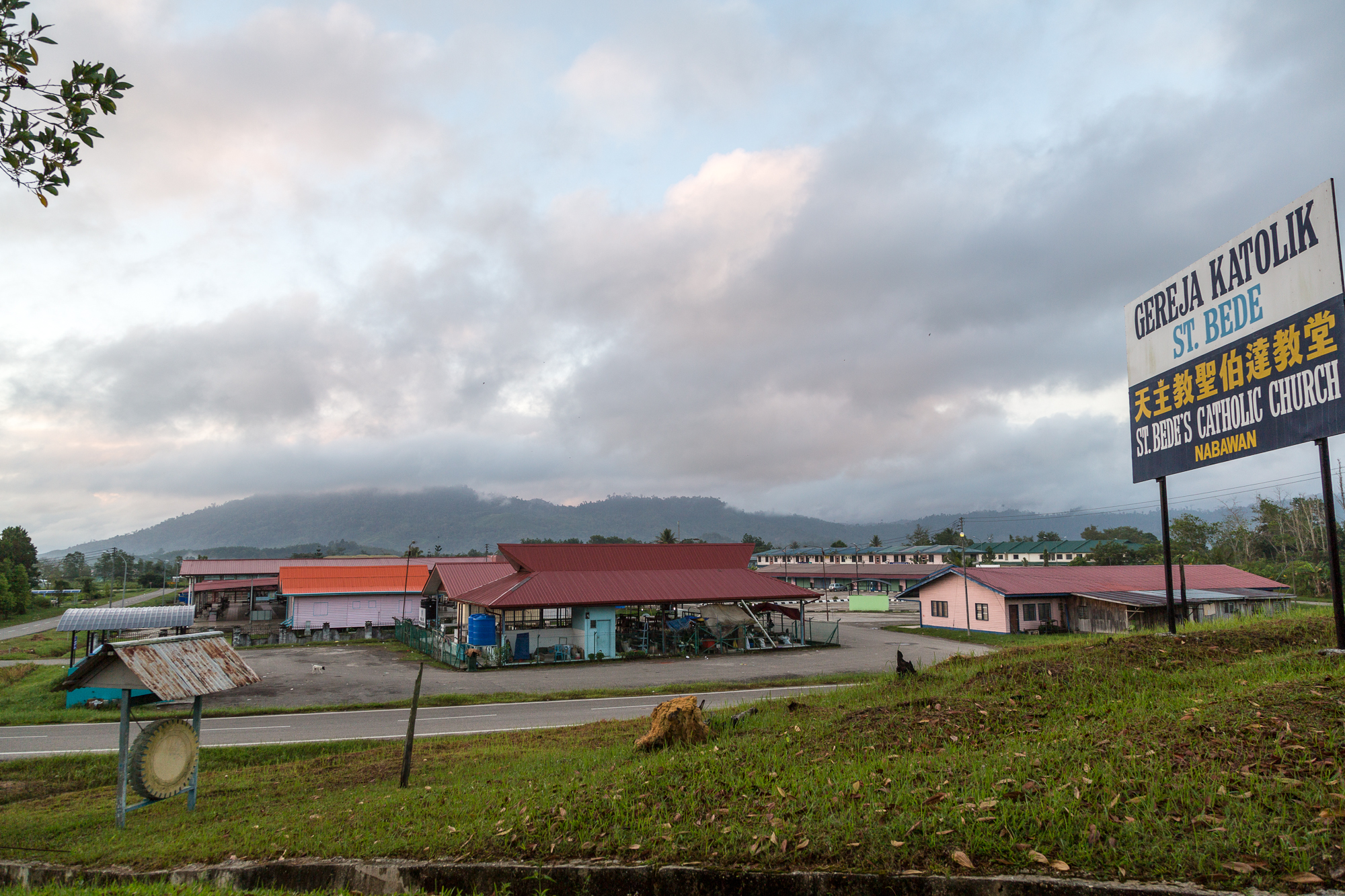
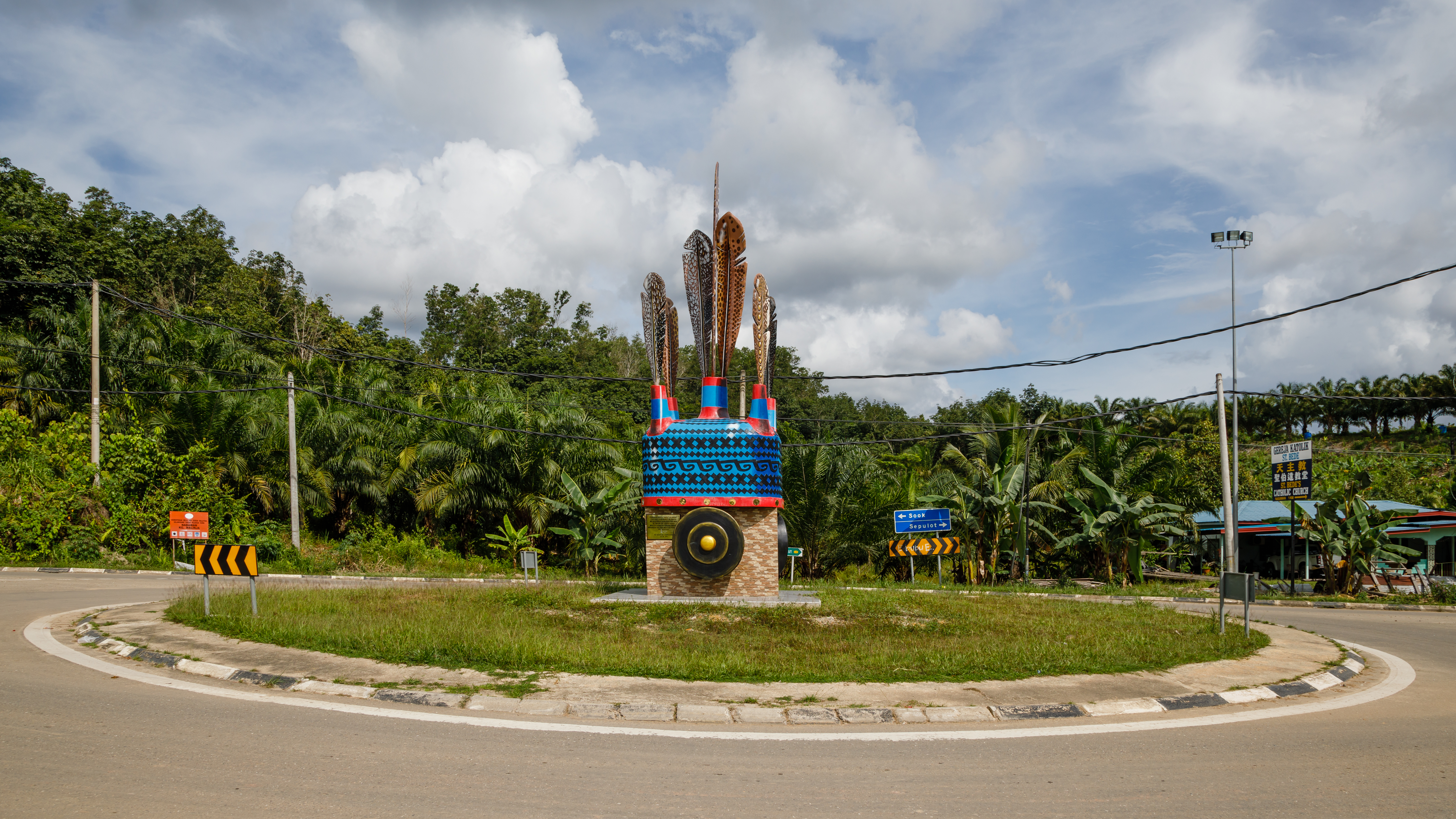
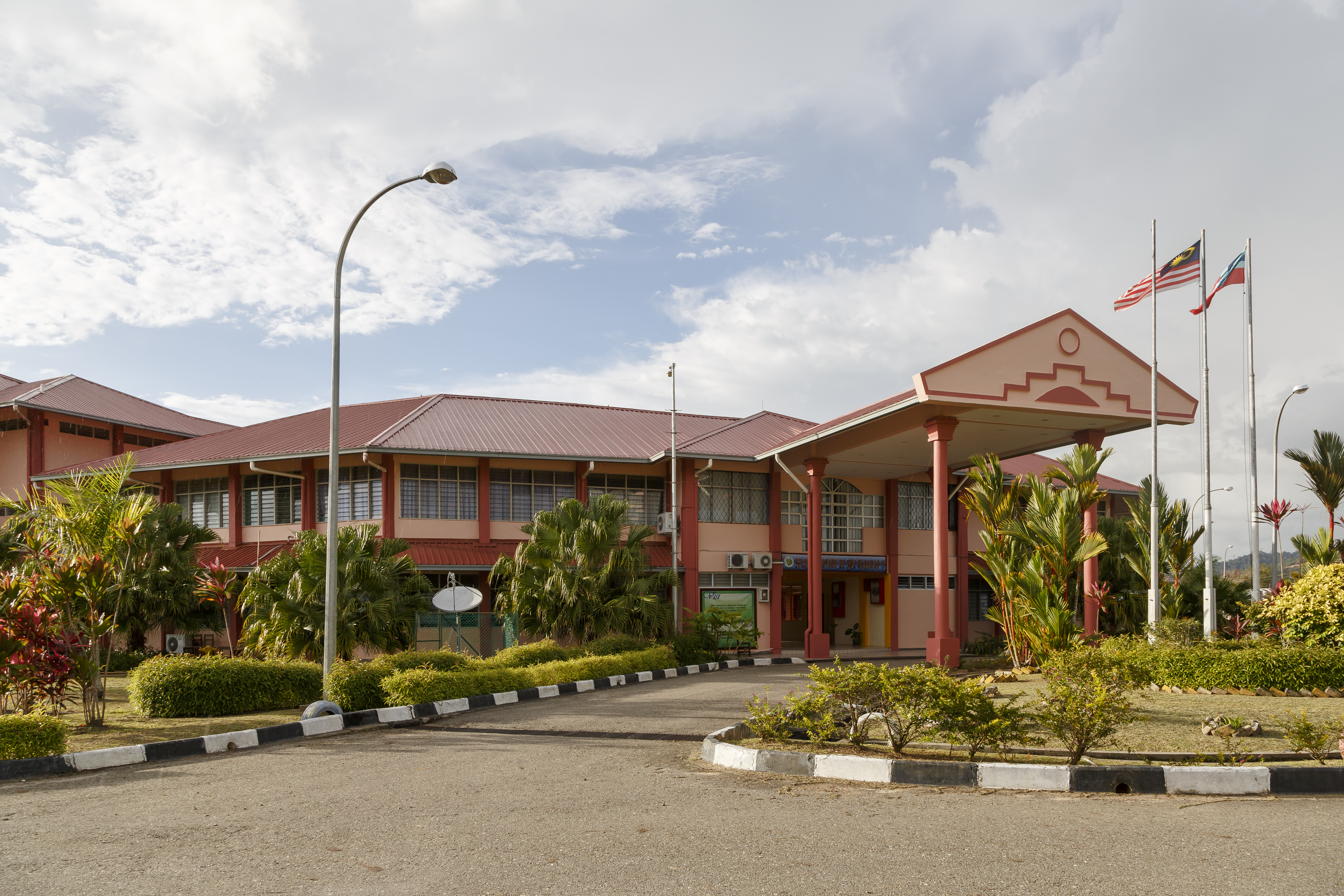
- From top, left to right: Overview Nabawan, Murut Headgear Roundabout, and the Nabawan High School 2

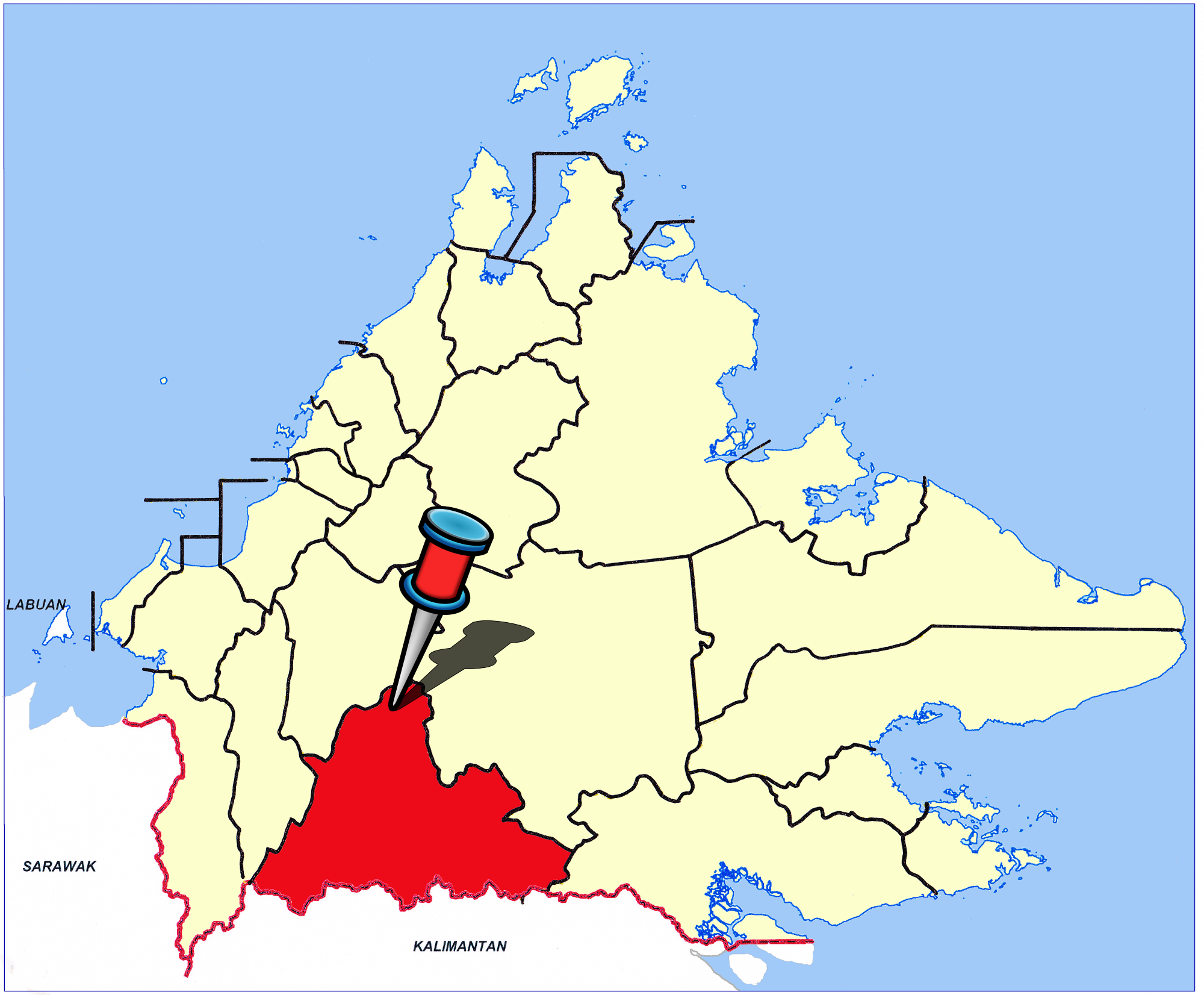
- Coordinates: 5°5′N 116°27′E
- Country: Malaysia
- State: Sabah
- Division: Interior
- District: Nabawan

Population (2010)
  - Total: 31,807

Nabawan (Malay: Pekan Nabawan) is the capital of the Nabawan District in the Interior Division of Sabah, Malaysia. Its population was estimated to be around 31,807 in 2010, comprising mostly the indigenous Murut Tahol and Murut Paluan, in Nabawan there's some place that you can go like Kokuom Hill and Panawan river
