= Pensiangan =

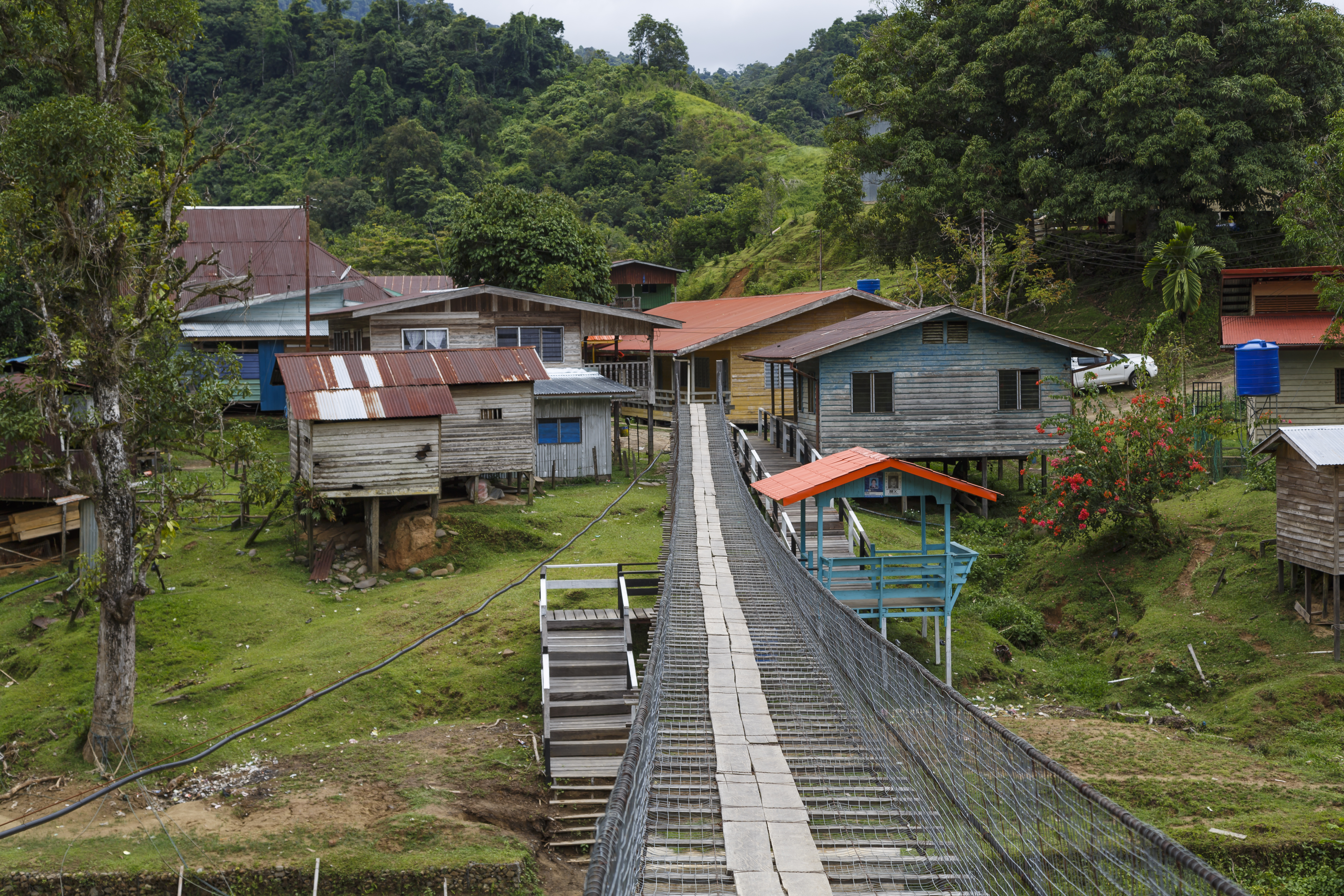
- Pensiangan

- Location within Borneo
- Coordinates: 4°33′N 116°19′E
- Country: Malaysia
- State: Sabah
- Division: Interior
- District: Nabawan
- Elevation: 161 m (528 ft)
- Highest elevation: 700 m (2,300 ft)

Pensiangan is a small town in the state of Sabah in Malaysia. It is located within the Nabawan District, Interior Division and is considered as a mukim under the sub-district of Pagalungan. It is one of the most rural towns in Sabah located deep in the jungles of Borneo, and about 115 kilometres from the nearest coastline. It is also situated less than 20 kilometres from the Indonesian border.
