= Nabawan District =

District in Sabah, Malaysia

Nabawan District Daerah Nabawan
- District
- Seal

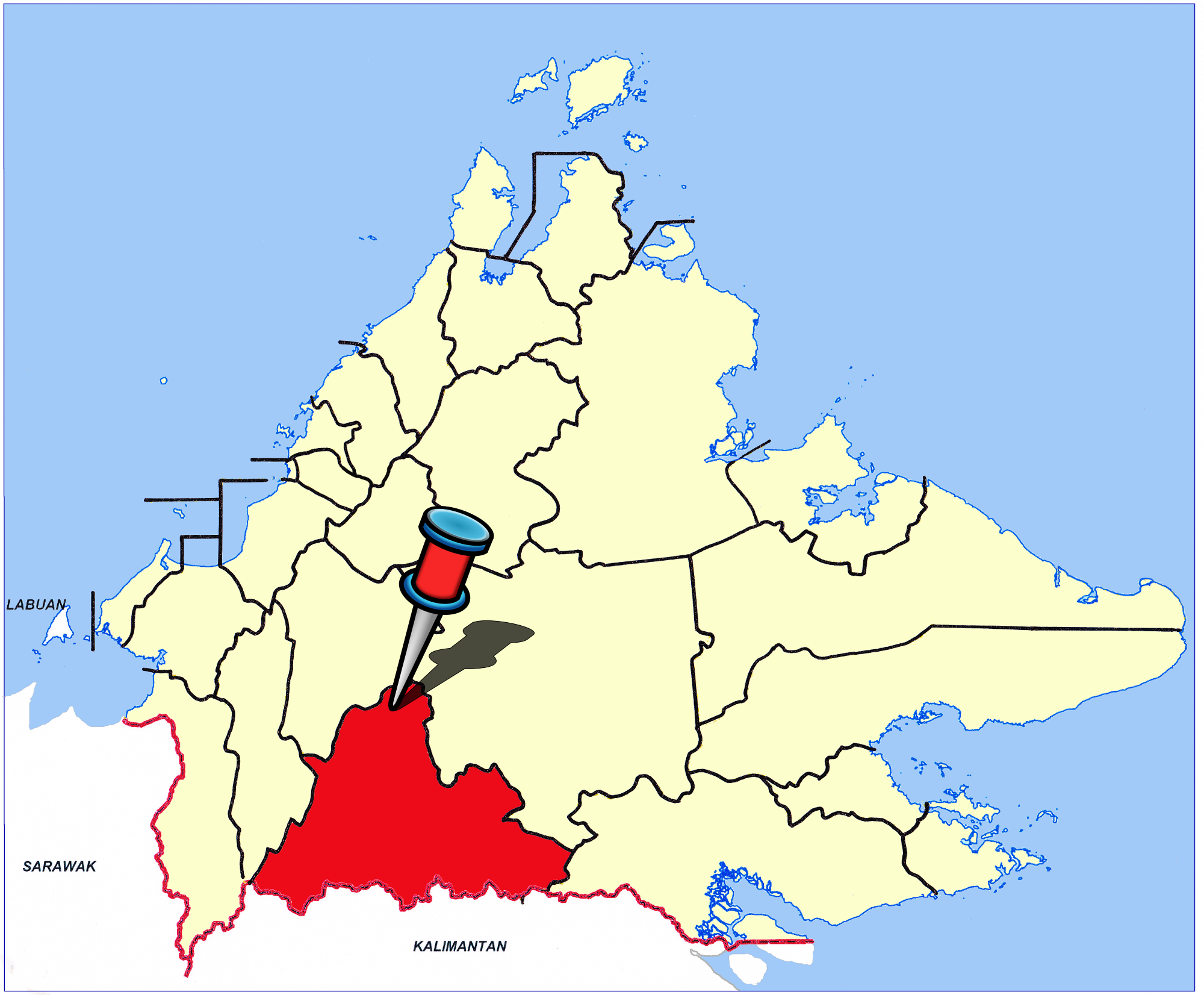
- Coordinates: 5°5′N 116°27′E
- Country: Malaysia
- State: Sabah
- Division: Interior
- Capital: Nabawan

Government
  - District Officer: Marshal Anthony @ Idham Anthony Abdullah

Area
  - Total: 6,089 km^{2} (2,351 sq mi)

Population (2010)
  - Total: 31,807
- Website: mdnabawan.sbh.gov.my pdnabawan.sbh.gov.my

Map of Nabawan District

The Nabawan District (Malay: Daerah Nabawan) is an administrative district in the Malaysian state of Sabah, part of the Interior Division which includes the districts of Beaufort, Keningau, Kuala Penyu, Nabawan, Sipitang, Tambunan and Tenom. The capital of the district is in Nabawan Town.

== History ==
The district is formerly known as Pensiangan District before been renamed into Nabawan District in 2004. The history of the district administration began in 1920. That year, the district got its own district office in Pensiangan, about 114 kilometres south of Nabawan. Since there were no roads in this area, the transport can only be reached by boat or with horse. Pensiangan got it's full district status in 1957. The district officers stationed in Pensiangan were therefore equipped with horses to perform their duties. The telephone connection to the outside world was an electroless cable laid along the footpath from Keningau to Pensiangan, to which telephones could be attached if required. The first district officer in early 1957 was I.C. Peck. In the spring of 1974, the administration of the Nabawan District Office was transferred to a newly established office. The Nabawan Scheme, a relocation plan by the United Sabah National Organisation (USNO) was trying to lure new settlers into the area. The plan was not very successful as it was poorly organised with many settlers did not stay longer and returned as they faced challenge to developing the area in addition to the strong traditional views held by the native people in the area.

== Demographics ==
According to the last census in 2018, the population of Nabawan district is 52,807 and almost exclusively consists of Murut and Lun Bawang/Lundayeh. The population is divided among the larger communities and the total area of the district as follows:

Nabawan District	31,807 inhabitants
Nabawan	576
Pensiangan	307
Sapulut	318
Remaining areas	30,606

== Gallery ==
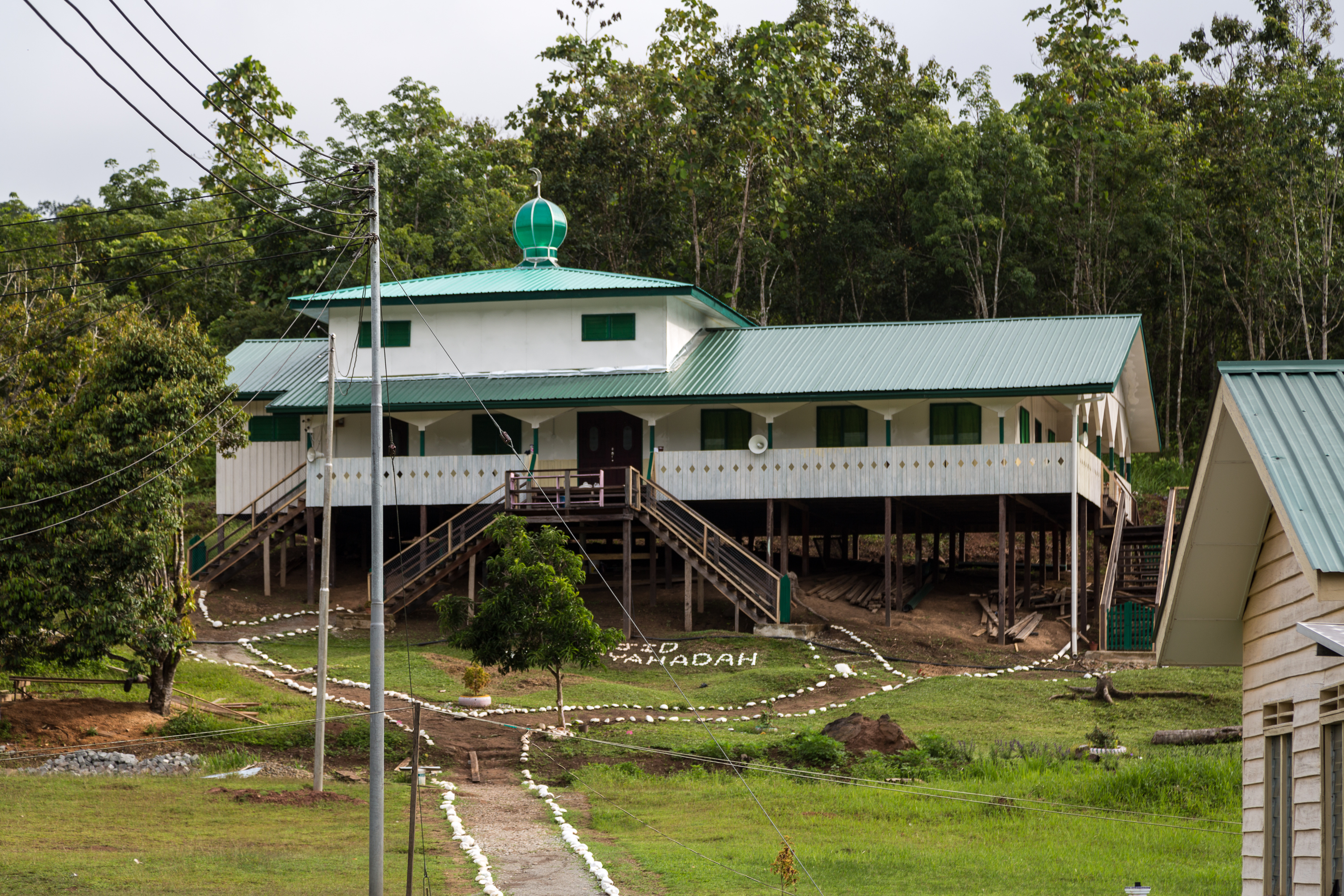
As-Syahadah Mosque.

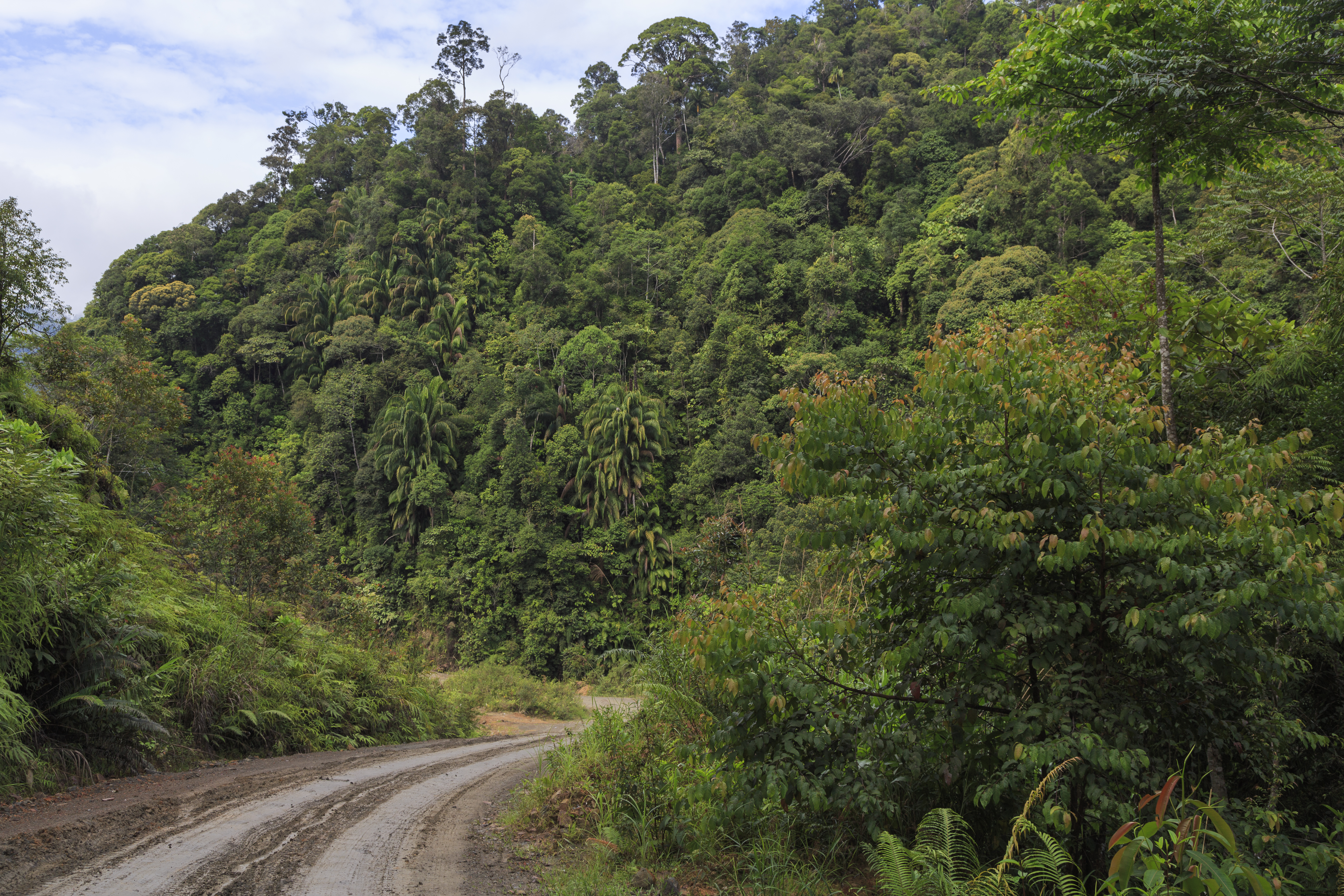
Pensiangan-Sapulut gravel road.

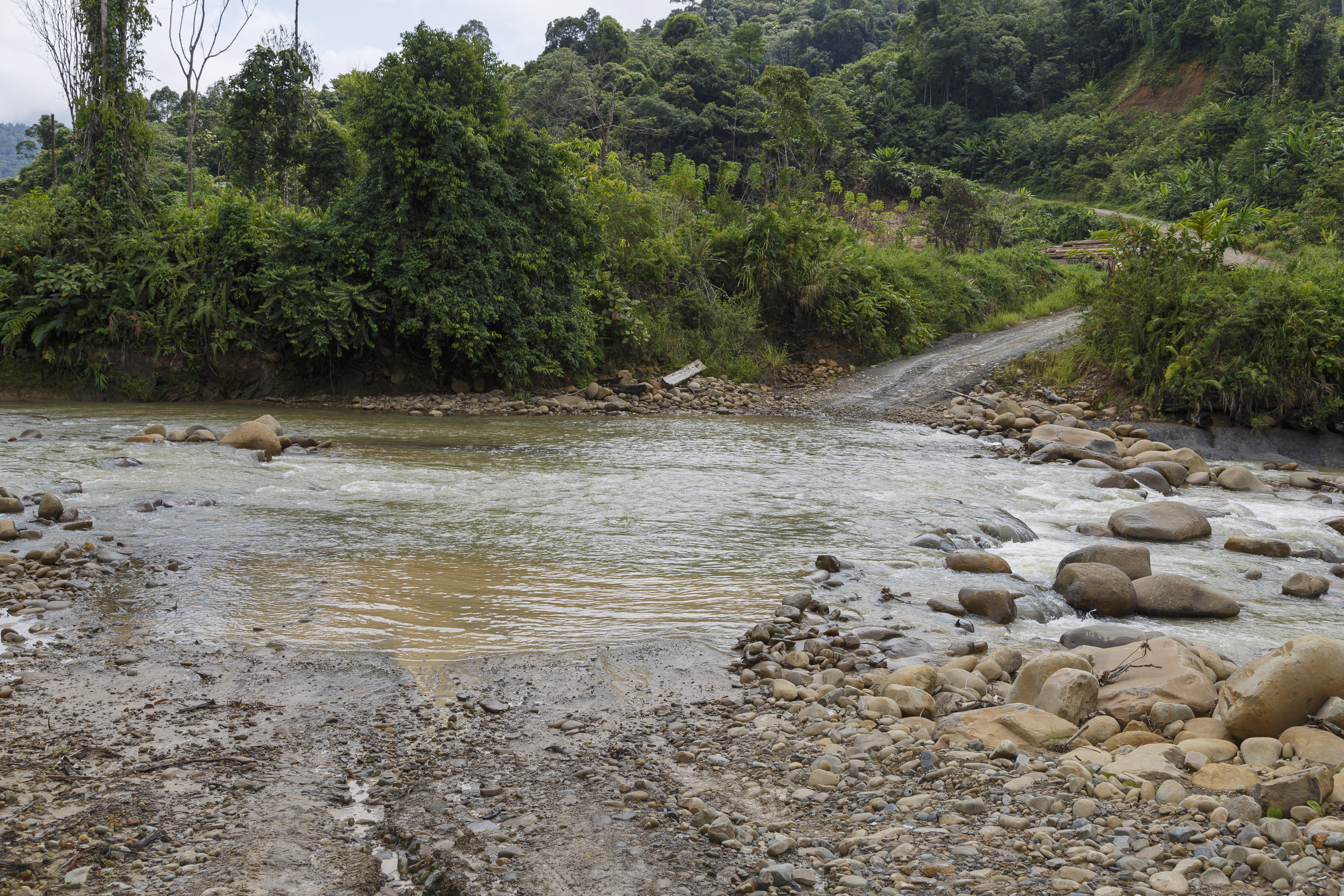
Sabenait River.

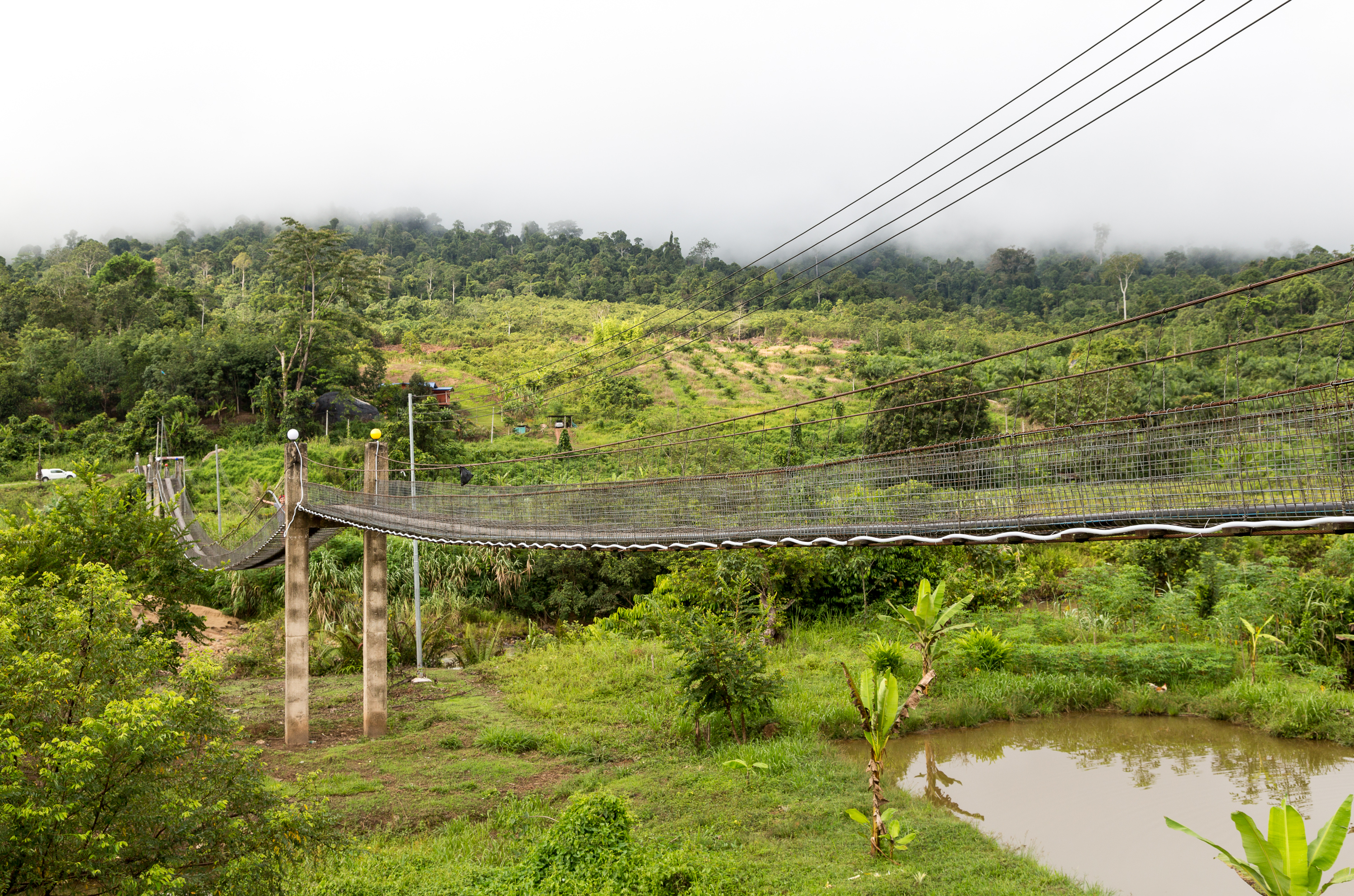
Swinging bridge over Talangkai River.

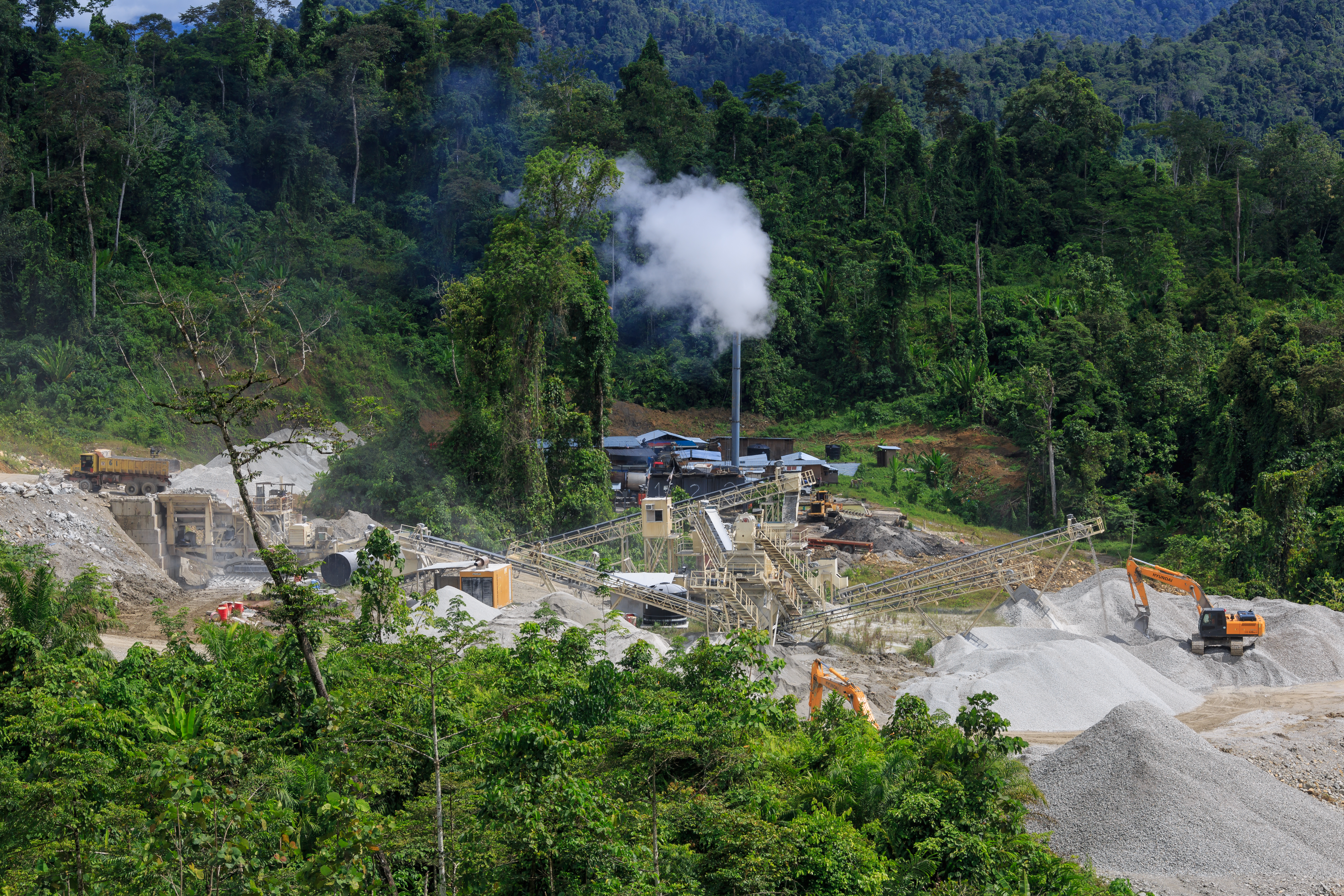
Nabawan rock mill.

== See also ==
- Districts of Malaysia
