= Cincin =

Malaysian kueh

Kuih cincin
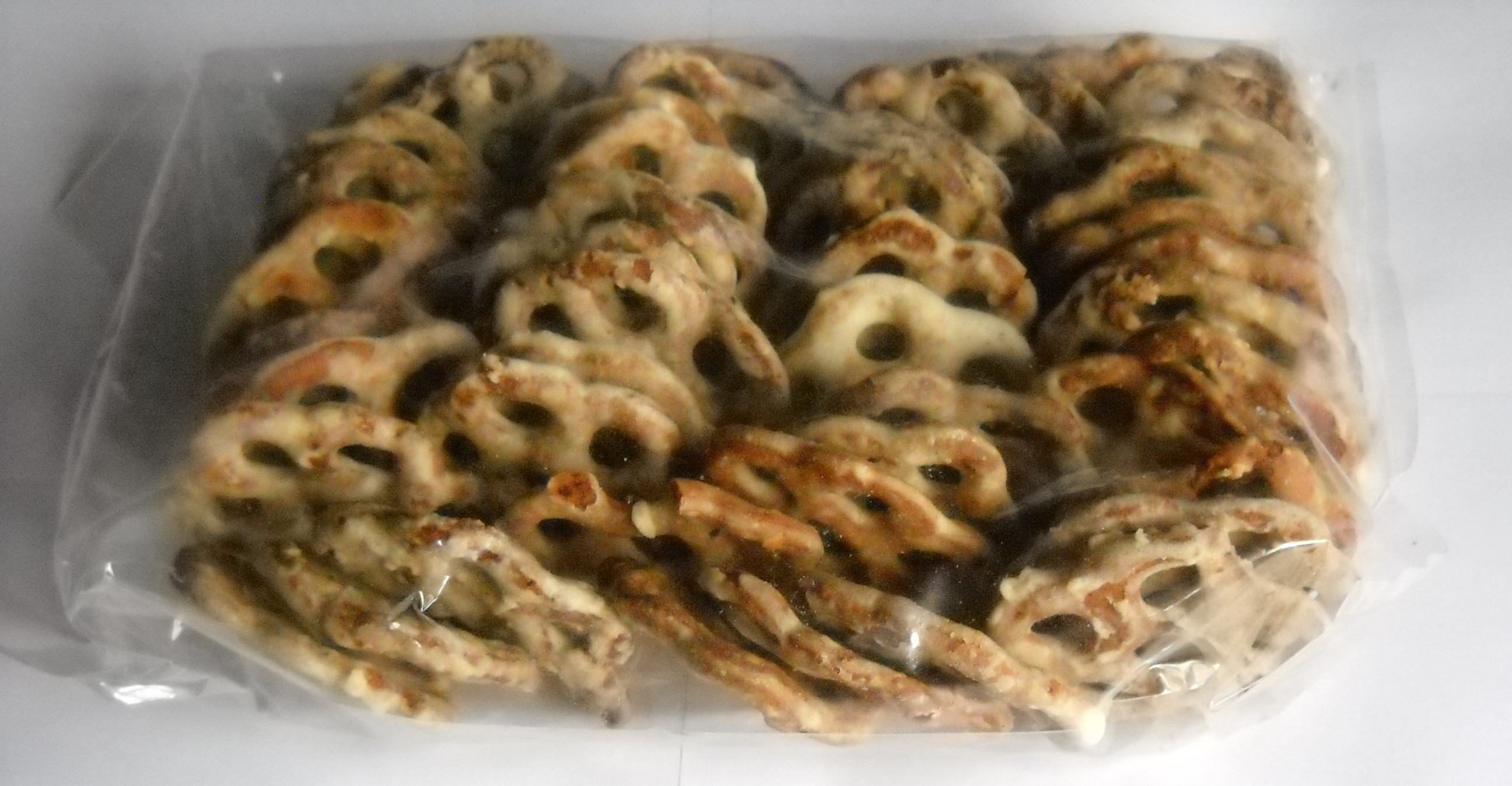
- A large pack of Kuih cincin.
- Type: Snack (Kuih)
- Place of origin: State of Sabah (Malaysia) & Brunei
- Main ingredients: Red palm (nipah), sugar, rice flour, cooking oil, water, palm sugar

Cincin (lit. 'ring cakes') is a traditional kuih for the Bruneian Malay people in Brunei and the Malaysian state of Sabah.

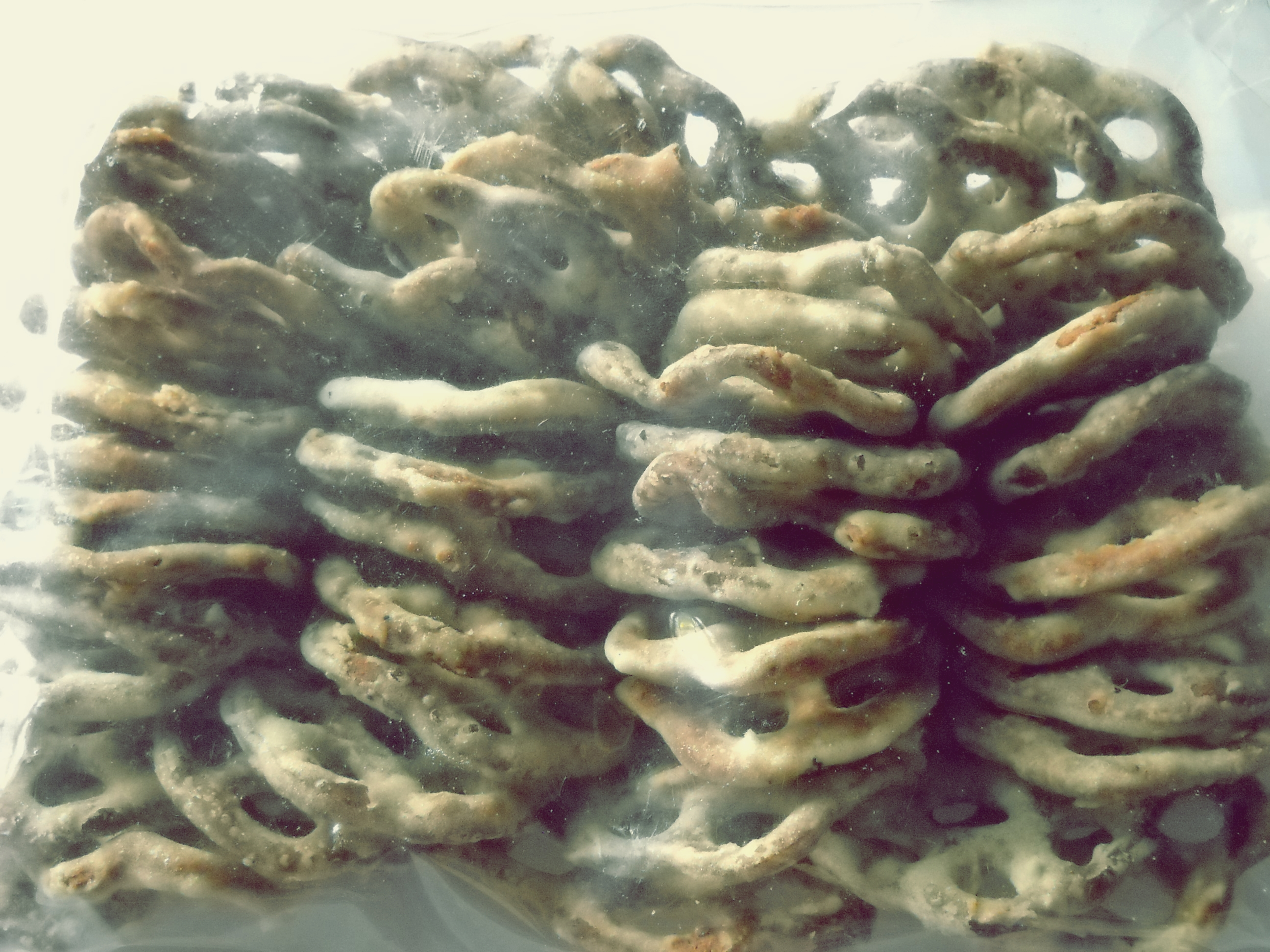
Close-up to Kuih cincin

== See also ==
- Bruneian cuisine
- Malaysian cuisine
- List of doughnut varieties
- List of fried dough varieties
