= Hinompuka =

Traditional rice cake of Sabah, Malaysia

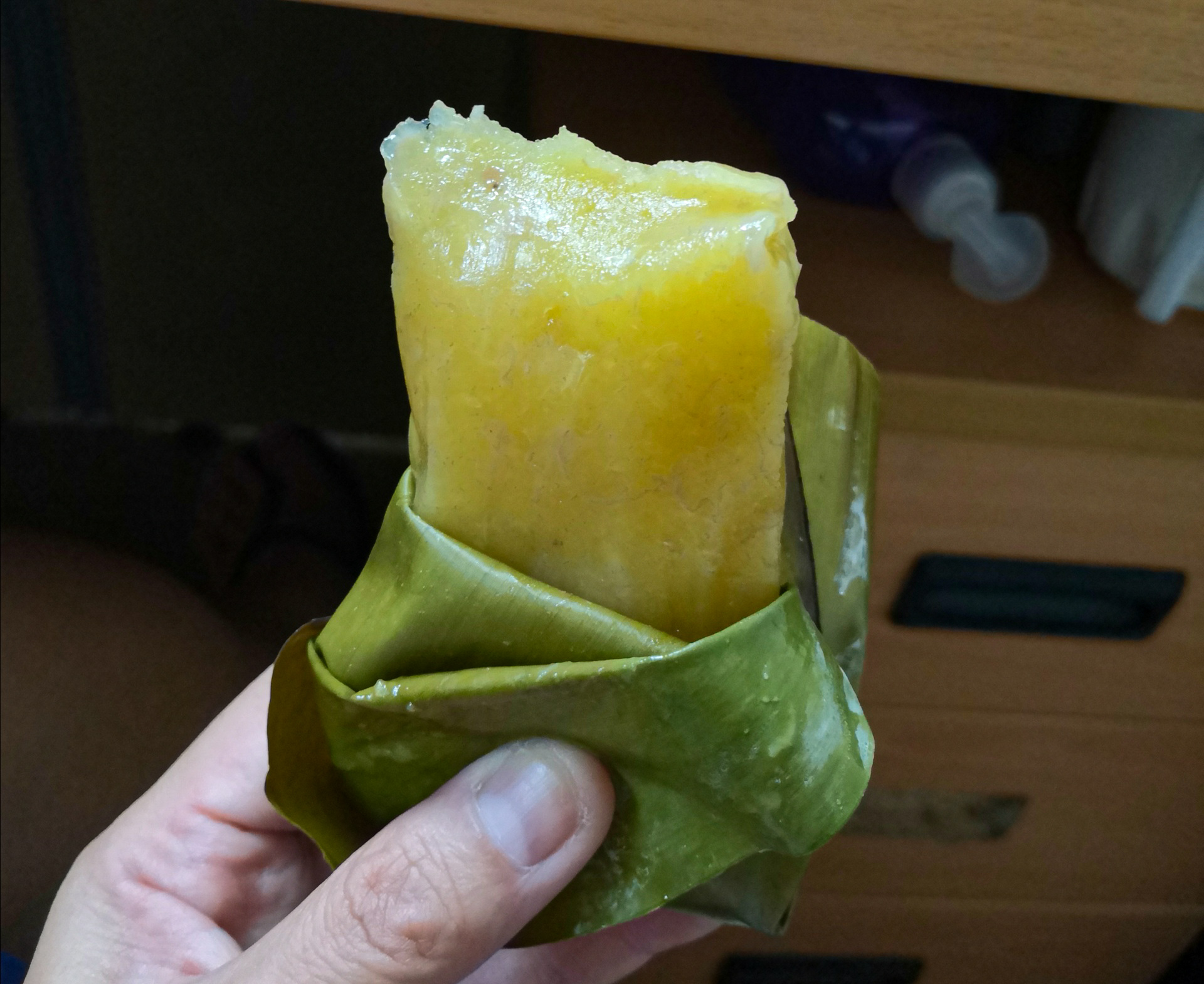
- A yellow hinompuka rice cake made from tapioca mixed with banana and wrapped in banana leaves
- Alternative names: bintanok, hinompuka' mundok, linobok, linompuka, lompuka, pais, tinapung, and steamed glutinous rice cake
- Type: Rice cake (kuih)
- Course: Dessert
- Place of origin: Malaysia
- Region or state: Sabah
- Associated cuisine: Sabahan cuisine
- Created by: Kadazan-Dusun and Rungus
- Main ingredients: Glutinous rice flour or black glutinous flour with tapioca or banana
- Ingredients generally used: Brown sugar or palm sugar, granulated sugar, coconut milk
- Food energy (per serving): 343 kcal (1,440 kJ)

Hinompuka (or also known as hinompuka' mundok, linompuka, or lompuka in various Kadazan dialect) is a traditional native steamed rice cake dessert of the Kadazan-Dusun, especially among the Kadazan of Penampang District in the state of Sabah within East Malaysia. The dessert is also referred to as bintanok among the indigenous Rungus people in the northern Kudat Division of Sabah.

The rice cake is known for its sweetness, chewy texture, fatty taste, and fragrant aroma resulting from the use of banana leaves as its main wrapper, often served during the harvest festival of Kaamatan. Similar to the making of kelupis and lamban during ethnic festivities and ceremonies, the rice cake is also done through a cooperative process, where family members or neighbours will gather together to jointly prepare the dessert.

== Origin and background ==
The hinompuka rice cake carries deep cultural, tradition, and historical value among the indigenous Kadazan-Dusun and Rungus community, often presented throughout the harvest festival as a sign of gratitude to Bambaazon/Bambarayon rice spirit for their bountiful harvest.

== Preparation ==
It is prepared by boiling water in a pot with either brown sugar or palm sugar and granulated sugar until all the sugar content dissolves and left to cool. Glutinous rice flour will then be added to the sugar water and stirred until all the mixture is properly mixed. The flour mixture will then be transferred into readily available banana or phacelophrynium maximum (irik) leaves and wrapped where it was then steamed for a total of 25 minutes before being served.

== See also ==
- Kelupis
- Lamban
- Pinjaram
