= Lidah =

Traditional Malaysian snack food

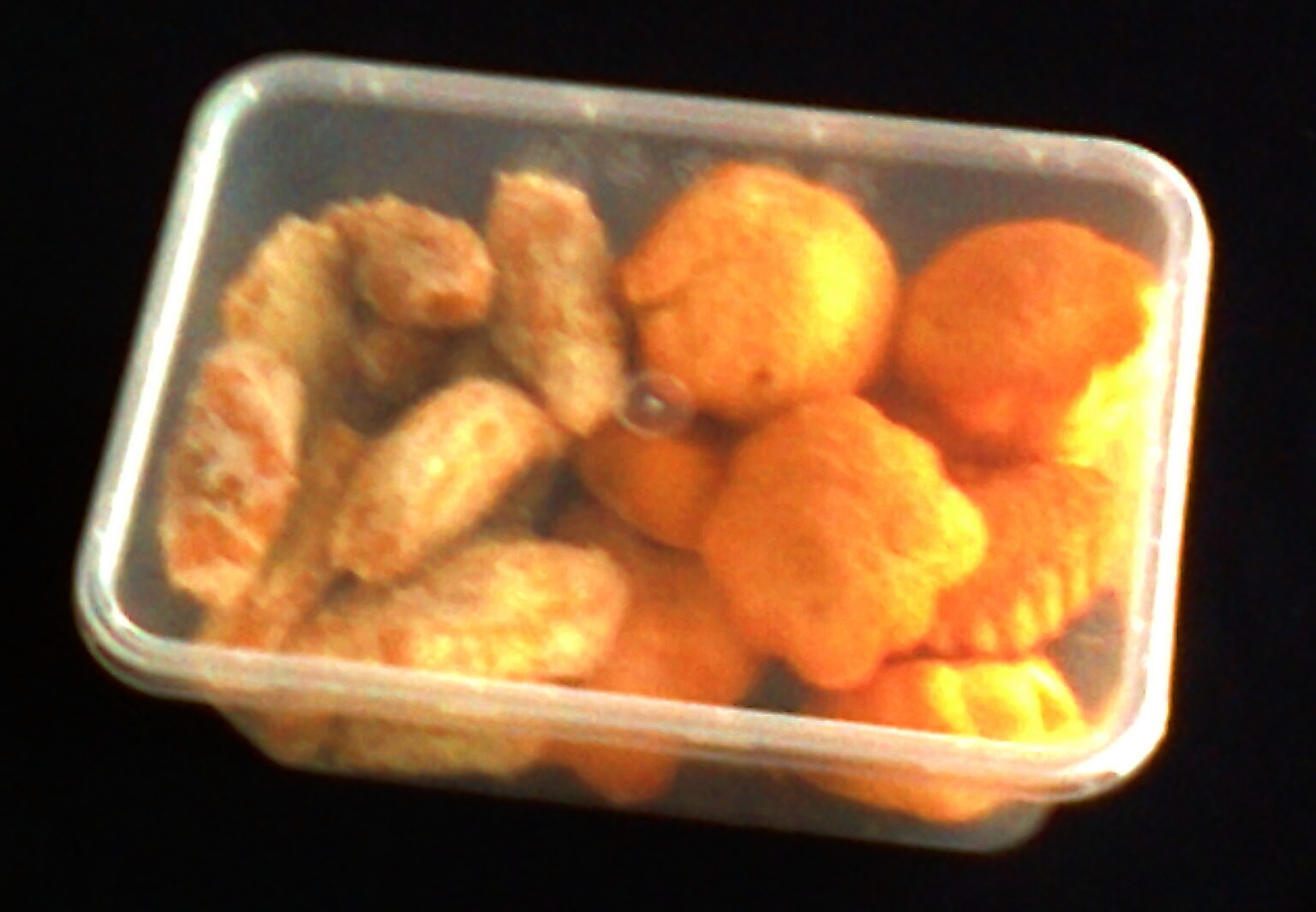
- Kuih lidah (left) and Bahulu (right).
- Type: Snack (Kuih)
- Place of origin: Malaysia
- Region or state: Papar, Sabah
- Created by: Bruneian Malay, Bajau
- Main ingredients: Wheat flour, powdered milk, sugar, butter, cooking oil

Kuih lidah is a traditional kuih for the Bruneian Malay people in Papar in the states of Sabah in Malaysia.
