= Kuih =

Southeast Asian snack or dessert foods

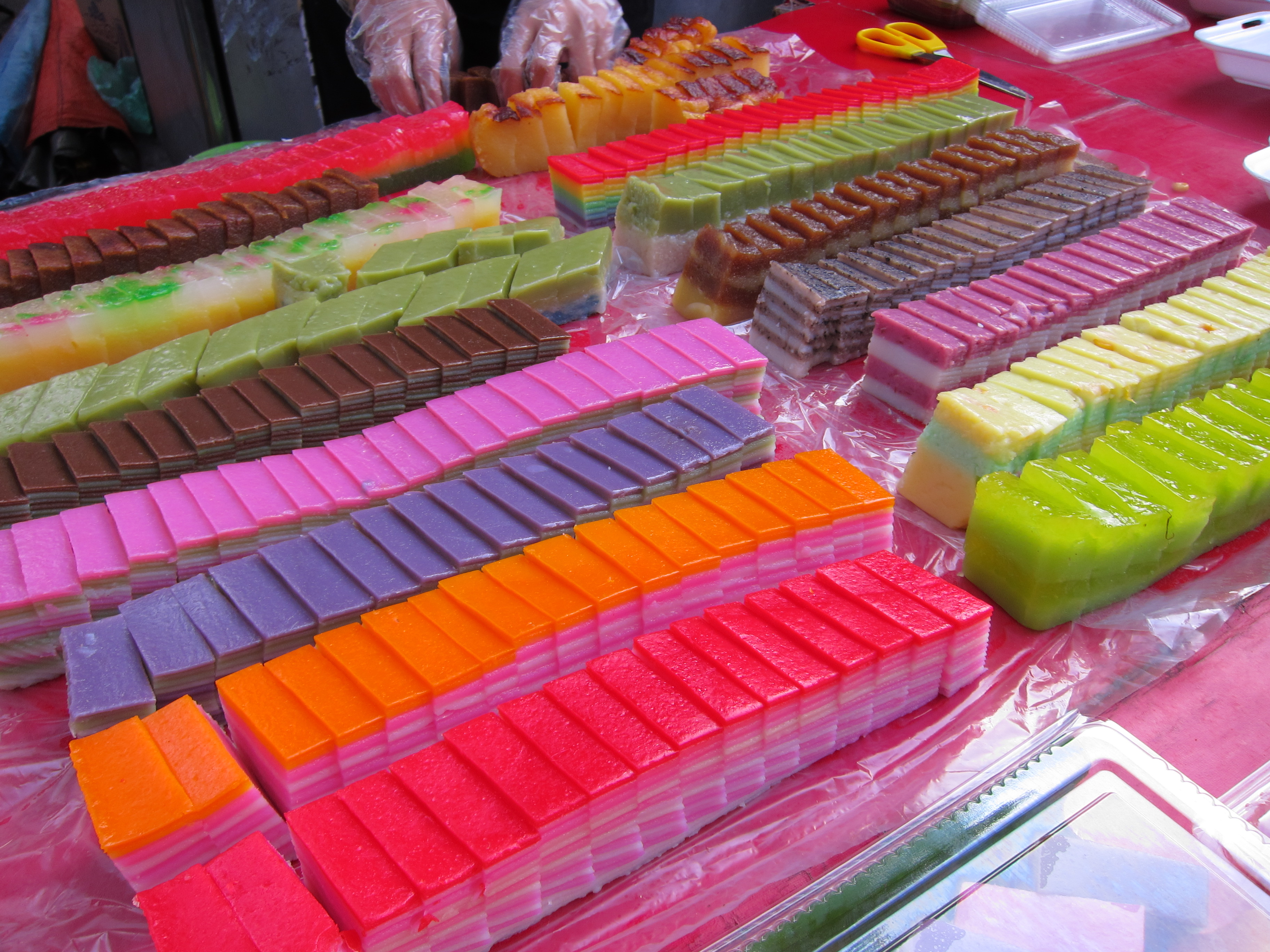
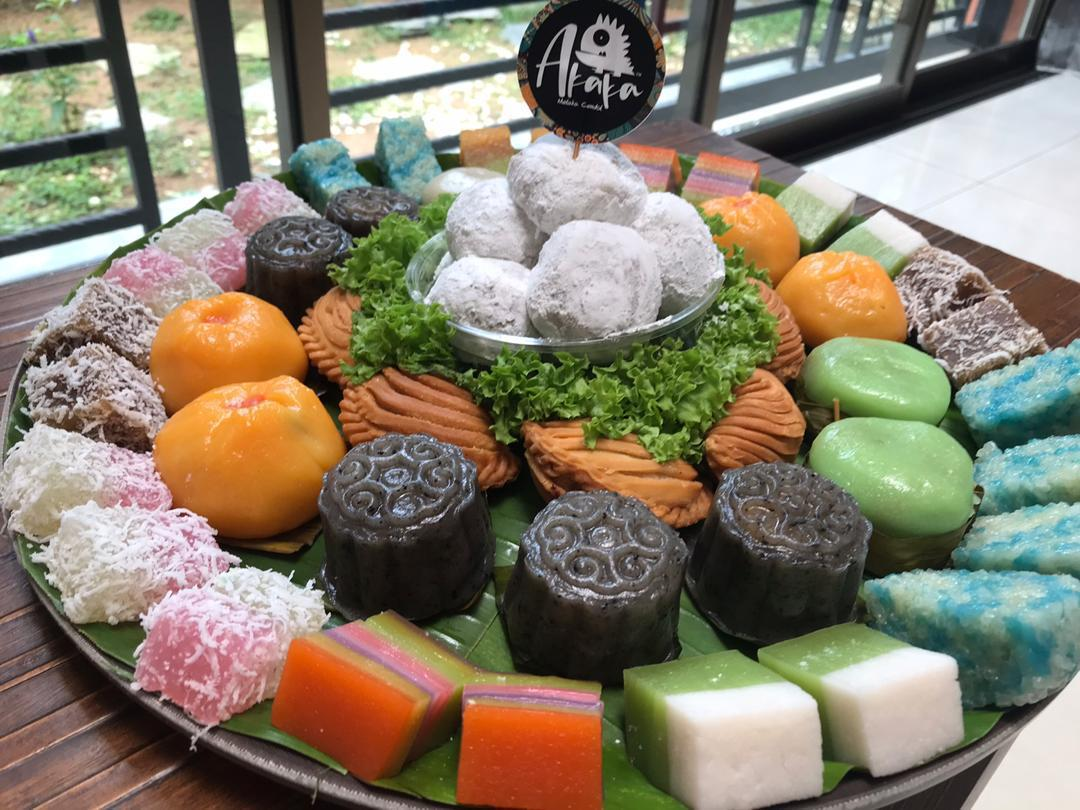
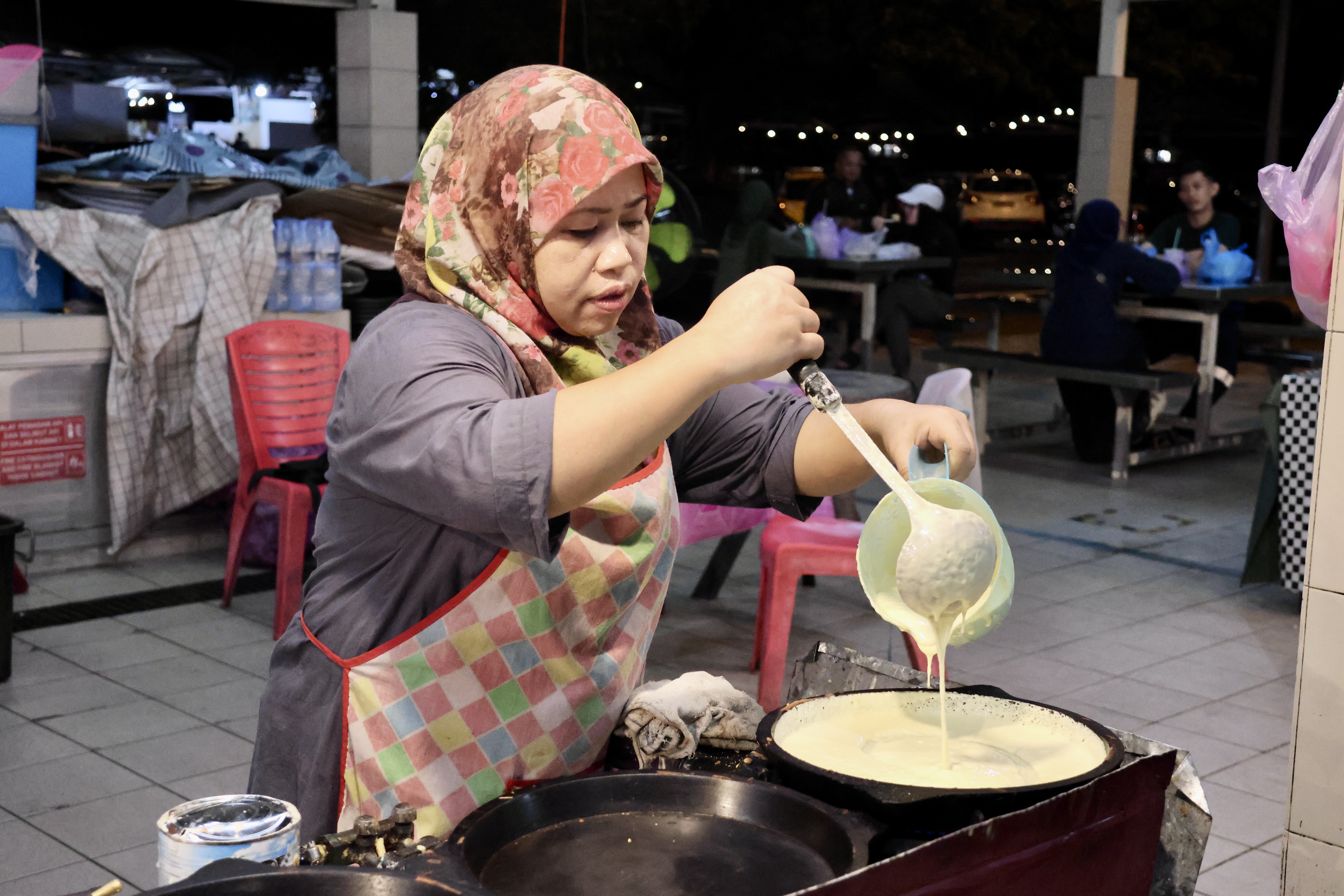
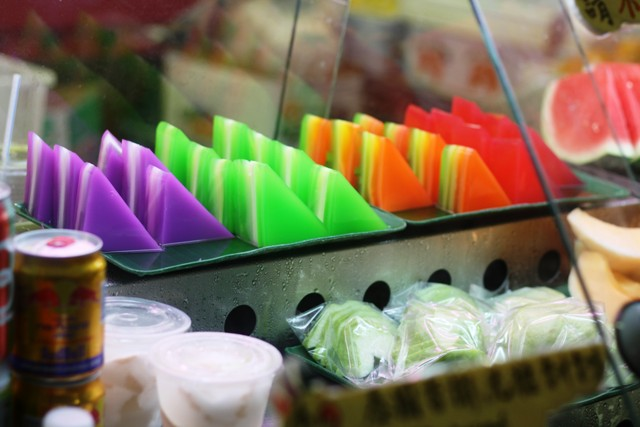
- Top left: Colourful kuih lapis in Kuala Lumpur, Malaysia; Top right: Akaka handmade nyonya kuih from Johor, Malaysia; Middle: A cook making the kuih Malaya (apam balik) at a night market in Gadong, Brunei; Bottom: Kueh lapis in Singapore
- Alternative names: Kue (Indonesia), Kueh (Singapore, Hokkien and Teochew)
- Course: Snack
- Region or state: Southeast Asia and China
- Associated cuisine: Brunei, China, Malaysia, Singapore, Indonesia (Kue)
- Main ingredients: Various traditional snacks
- Similar dishes: Mont, Khanom, Bánh, Kakanin

Kuih (Jawi: کوءيه; Indonesian: kue; derived from Southern Min koé 粿) are bite-sized snack or dessert foods commonly found in Southeast Asia (particularly in the Malay Archipelago) and China. It is a fairly broad term which may include items that would be called cakes, cookies, dumplings, pudding, biscuits, or pastries in English and are usually made from rice or glutinous rice. In China, where the term originates, koé in Hokkien and kué in Teochew (known as guǒ in Mandarin) refer to snacks which are typically made from rice but can occasionally be made from other grains, such as wheat. The term kuih is widely used in Malaysia, Brunei, and Singapore; kueh (the pre-1972 spelling of kuih) is used in Singapore and Indonesia; kue is used in Indonesia only; and all three refer to sweet or savoury desserts.

Similar snacks are found throughout Southeast Asia, including the Burmese mont, Filipino kakanin, Thai khanom and Vietnamese bánh. For example, the colourful steamed kue lapis and the rich kuih bingka ubi are also available in Myanmar, Thailand, and Vietnam albeit with each country localised name and ingredients.

Kuihs are not confined to a certain meal but can be eaten throughout the day. They are an integral part of Malaysian, Indonesian, Bruneian, and Singaporean festivities such as Hari Raya and Chinese New Year. Many kuih are sweet, but some are savoury.

== Background and history ==
The culinary legacy of kuih can be traced to the 15th century when it flourished in the Southeast Asian region from a combination of local ingredients and food culture brought through trade or colonisation. The indigenous Southeast Asians produced a variety of snack delicacies using both local and imported ingredients, with migration, colonisation, modernisation and globalisation having all played a part in the creation and evolution of kuih.

== Kuih by ethnic categories ==
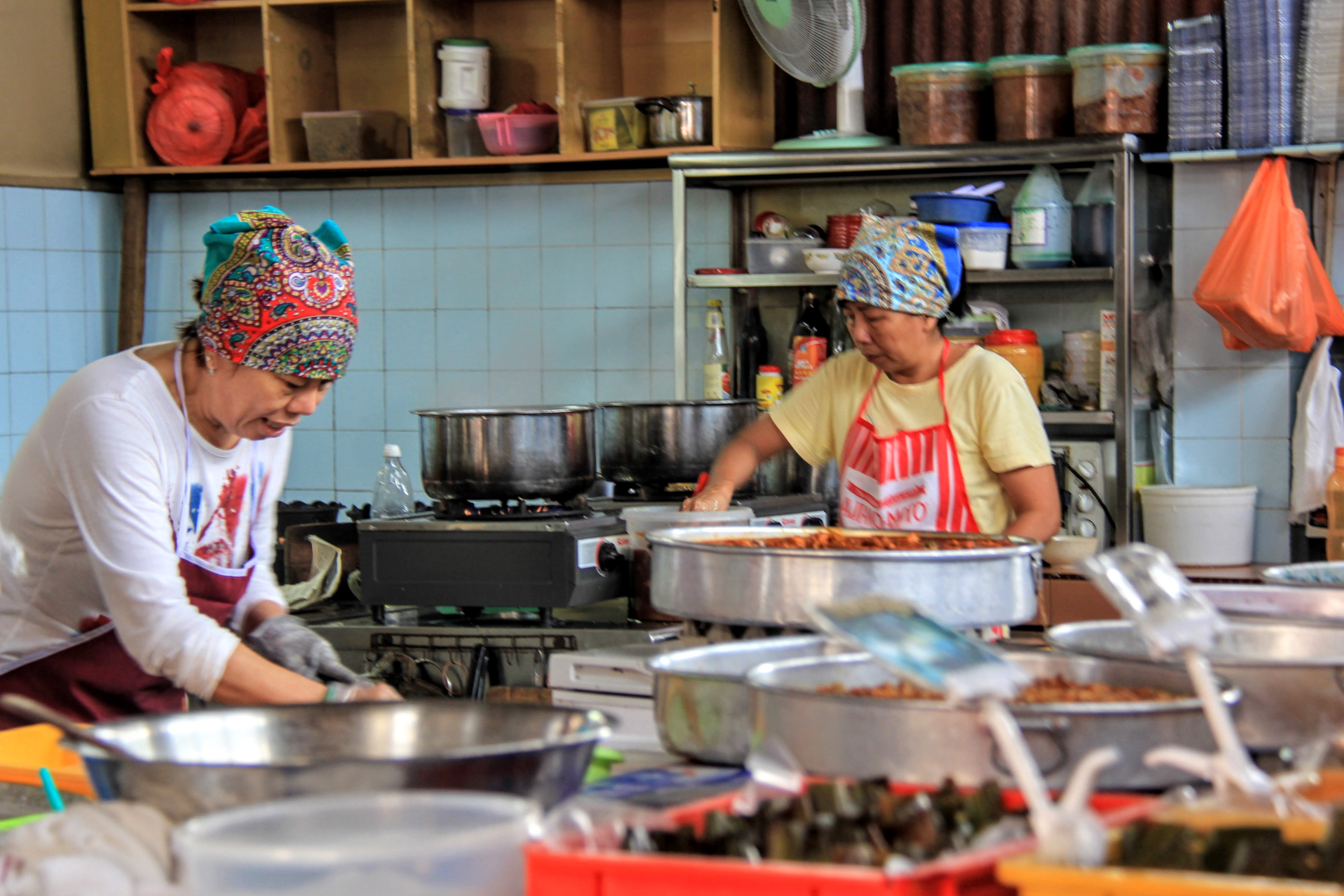
Nyonya cook making various traditional kuih

Kuih is made and enjoyed by different ethnicities with the most commercially successful ones being made by Peranakan (Baba Nyonyas) in the southern parts of Malaysia. The Nyonyas made kuih from many sorts of ingredients such as cane sugars, brown sugars, and honey aside of palm sugar. Nyonya (Peranakan) kuih are sometimes represented as distinct from Malay and Indonesian kuih, but many Nyonya kuih are fundamentally the same as Malay or Indonesian kuih. For some Nyonya kuih, there are minor changes to Malay kuih to suit Peranakan eating habits and tastes.

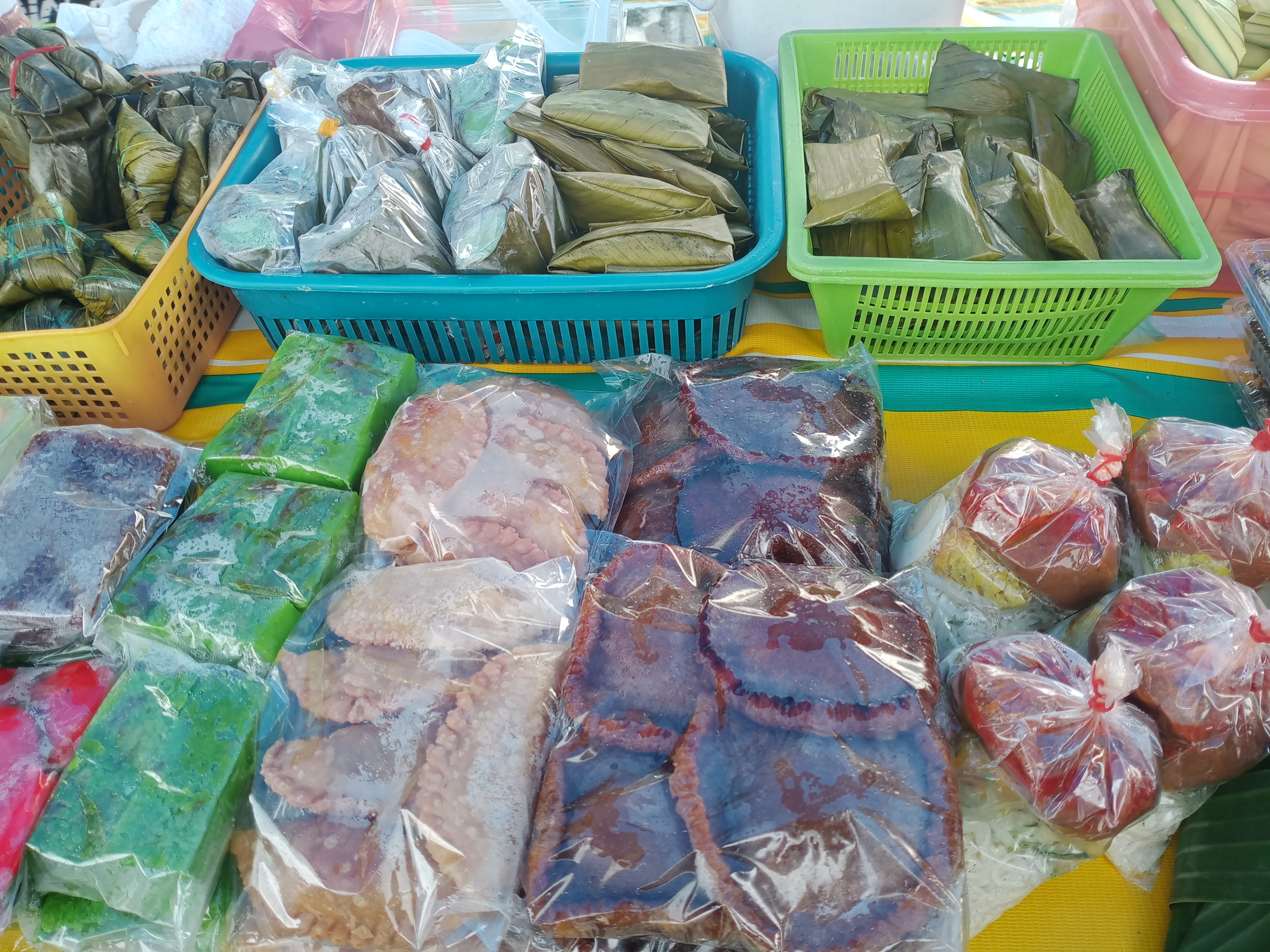
Variety of traditional kuih sold at a tamu (weekly market) in Papar, Malaysia

In almost every Malay kuih, the most common flavouring ingredients are grated coconut (flavoured or plain), coconut cream (thick or thin), pandan (screwpine) leaves and gula melaka (palm sugar, either fresh or aged), one example are the kuih lompang. While those make the flavour of kuih, their base and texture are built on a group of starches: rice flour, glutinous rice flour, glutinous rice and tapioca. Two other common ingredients are tapioca flour and green bean (mung bean) flour (sometimes called "green pea flour" in certain recipes). They play the most important part in giving kuihs their distinctive soft, almost pudding-like, yet firm texture. In the northern states of Kedah, Perak, Perlis, Kelantan, and Terengganu kuih (kuih-muih in Malay) are usually sweet. In the central and southeast Peninsular states of Johor, Malacca, Negeri Sembilan and Selangor, savoury kuih can be found. Kuih are more often steamed than baked, and are thus very different in texture, flavour and appearance from Western cakes or puff pastries. While many kuih in West Malaysia, Singapore, and Brunei are made with the steamed method, which results in a soft texture, most kuih made by different indigenous groups from the Bornean island region of Sabah and Sarawak in East Malaysia are often crunchy since most are produced through frying methods.

Wheat flour is rarely used in Southeast Asian cakes and pastries. For most kuih, there is no single "original" or "authentic" recipe. Traditionally, making kuih was the domain of elderly grandmothers, aunts and other womenfolk, for whom the only (and best) method for cooking was by "agak-agak" (approximation). They would take handfuls of ingredients and mix them without any measurements or any need of weighing scales. The end product is judged by its look and feel, the consistency of the batter and how it feels to the touch. Each family holds its own traditional recipe as well as each region and state with the recipes have been passed down from one generation to other generations.

=== Malay, Peranakan and indigenous kuih ===
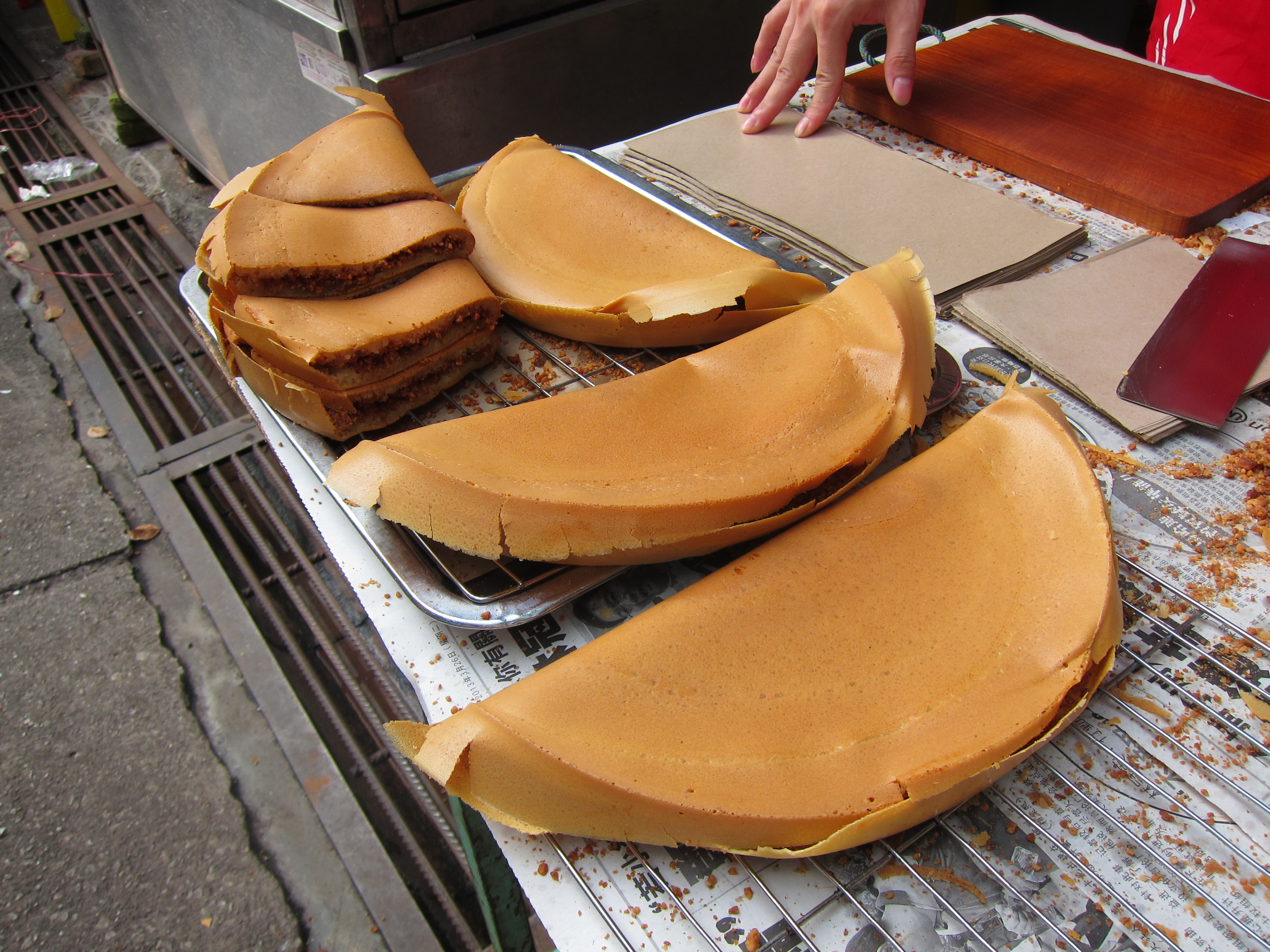
Apam balik (turnover/upside down pancake) can be found throughout Malaysia street market, part of the country street food culture

- Apam balik – a turnover pancake with a texture similar to a crumpet with crisp edges, made from a flour-based batter with raising agent. It is typically cooked on a griddle and topped with caster sugar, ground peanut, creamed corn, and grated coconut in the middle, and then turned over. Many different takes on this dish exist as part of the culinary repertoire of the Malay, Chinese, Peranakan, Indonesian, and ethnic Bornean communities; all under different names.
- Bahulu – tiny crusty sponge cakes which come in distinctive shapes like button and goldfish, acquired from being baked in moulded pans. Bahulu is usually baked and served for festive occasions.

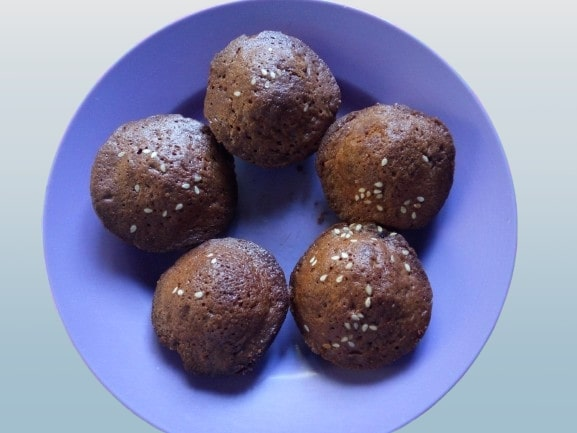
Borasa, a traditional kuih for the Bugis community in Tawau Division of the Malaysian state of Sabah

- Borasa – Similar to Bahulu, with added palm sugar and sesame seeds.

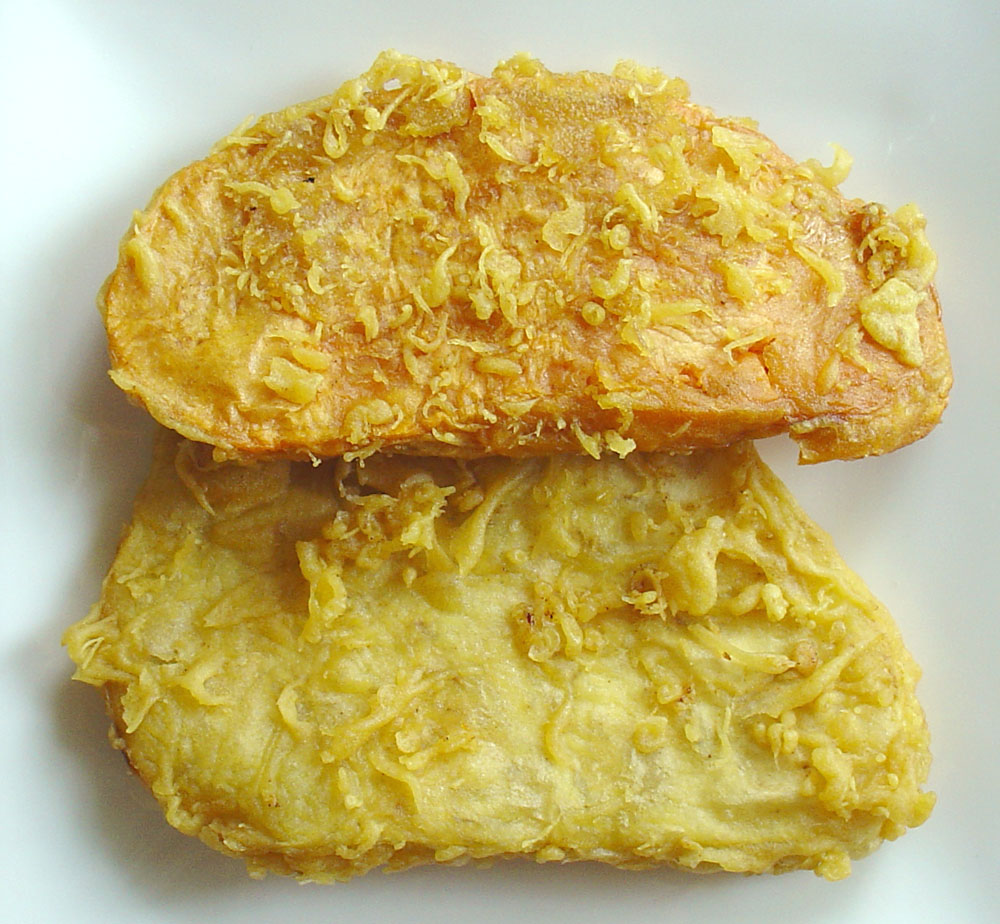
Yam and sweet potato fritters in Malaysia. Fritters are a type of kuih cucur in the country

- Cucur – deep-fried fritters, sometimes known as jemput-jemput. Typical varieties include cucur udang (fritters studded with a whole unshelled prawn), cucur badak (sweet potato fritters), and cucur kodok (banana fritters).
- Curry puff – a small pie filled with a curried filling, usually chicken or potatoes, in a deep-fried or baked pastry shell.
- Hinompuka – traditional steamed rice cake among the indigenous Kadazan-Dusun of Sabah, known for its sweetness, chewy texture, fatty taste, and fragrant aroma often served during the harvest festival of Kaamatan.
- Kuih akok – a rich confection made with liberal quantities of eggs, coconut milk, flour and brown sugar, akok have a distinctive sweet caramel taste. It is popular in the states of Kelantan and Terengganu.
- Kuih cara – a pandan-flavoured Malay kuih made from eggs, sugar, coconut milk and flour which is baked in specialised moulds to give it its distinctive shape.
- Kuih cincin – a deep fried dough pastry-based snack popular with East Malaysia's Muslim communities.

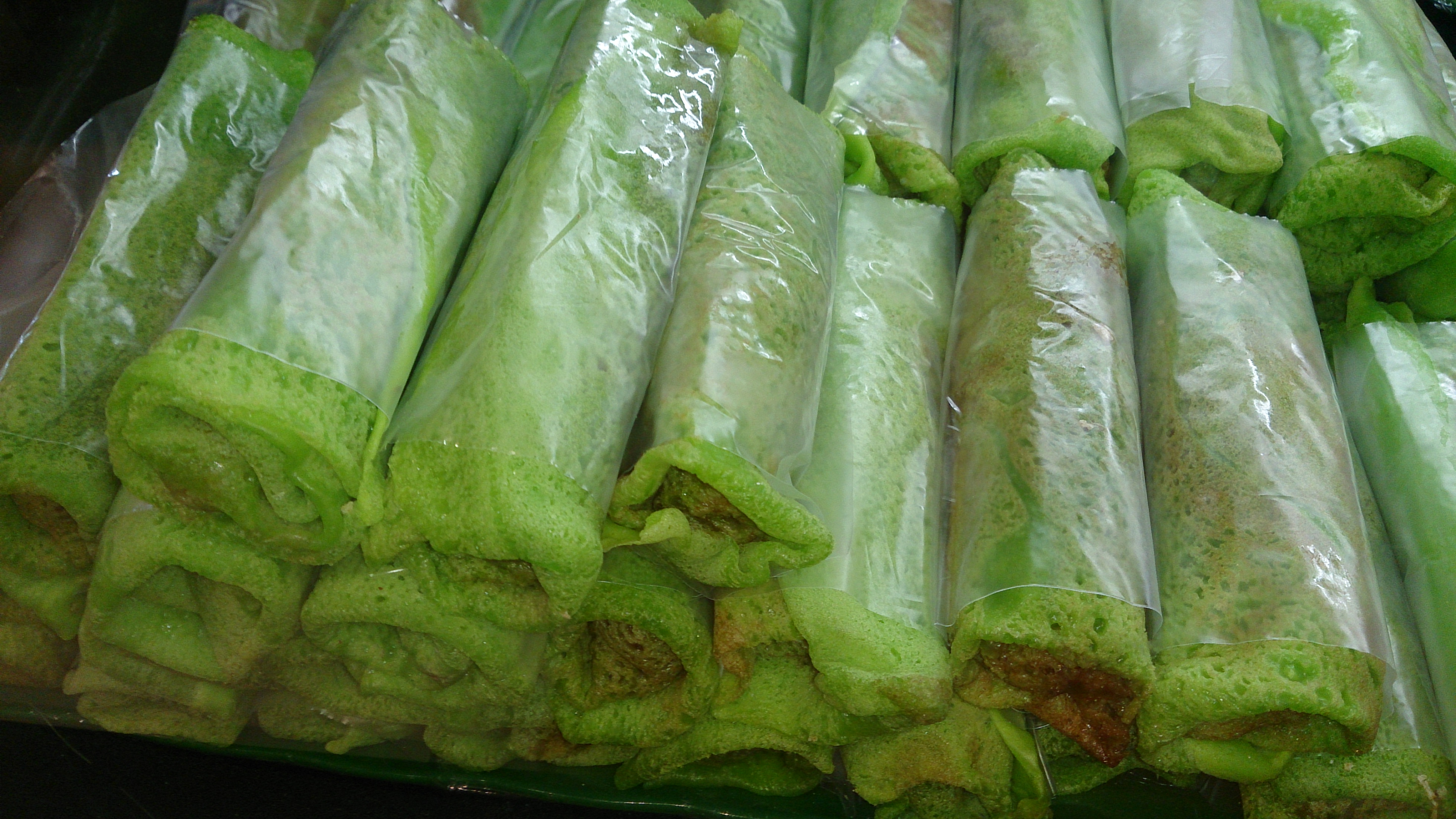
Kuih gulung (also known as kuih ketayap or kuih lenggang) are commonly found within Malaysian street stalls wrapped with plastic

- Kuih gulung, kuih ketayap or kuih lenggang – mini crepes rolled up with a palm sugar-sweetened coconut filling. The crepes are coloured and flavoured with pandan essence.
- Kuih jala – a type of traditional fried confection in the eastern states of Sabah and Sarawak. A rice flour batter is ladled into an emptied coconut shell bearing many small holes underneath, which is then held over hot oil and moved in a circular motion. The mixture will drip into the oil like thread, and forms a lattice-like layer on the oil as it fries to a solid crisp.
- Kuih jelurut – also known as kuih celorot/selorot in Sarawak, this kuih is made from a mixture of gula apong and rice flour, then rolled with palm leaves into cones and steam cooked.
- Kuih kapit, sapit or sepi – these crispy folded wafer biscuits are colloquially known as "love letters".
- Kuih keria – fried doughnuts made with a sweet potato batter and rolled in caster sugar.

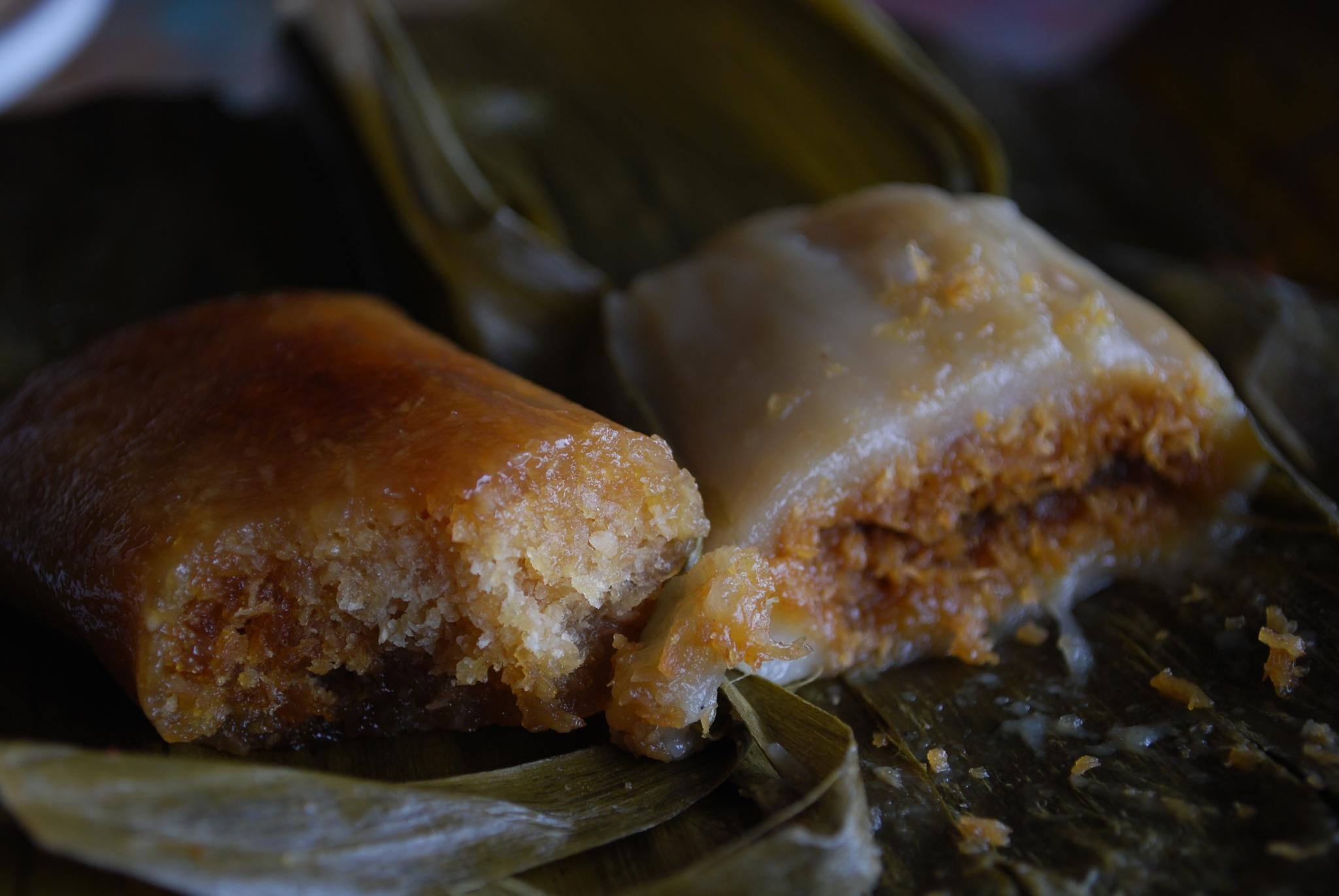
A close-up of kuih kochi from a Malay Singaporean café in Melbourne, Australia

- Kuih kochi – glutinous rice dumplings filled with a sweet paste, shaped into a pyramid-like shape and wrapped with banana leaves.
- Kuih lapis – a sweet steamed cake made from rice flour, coconut milk, sugar and various shades of edible food colouring done with many individual layers.
- Kuih lidah – (lit. 'tongue kuih') hails from the Bruneian Malay community of Papar, specifically Kampung Berundong, in Sabah and possesses designated GI status.
- Kuih makmur – a traditional Malay kuih made from butter, ghee and flour. Served during special occasion of Eid al-Fitr and identified with its white colour and usually in a round shape.
- Kuih pie tee – this Nyonya speciality is a thin and crispy pastry tart shell filled with a spicy, sweet mixture of thinly sliced vegetables and prawns.
- Kuih pinjaram – a saucer-shaped deep-fried fritter with crisp edges and a dense, chewy texture towards the centre. It is widely sold by street food vendors in the open-air markets of East Malaysia.
- Kuih serimuka – a two-layered kuih with steamed glutinous rice forming the bottom half and a green custard layer made with pandan juice.
- Kuih talam – this kuih has two layers. The top consists of a white layer made from coconut milk and rice flour, whereas the bottom layer is green and is made from green pea flour flavoured with pandan.

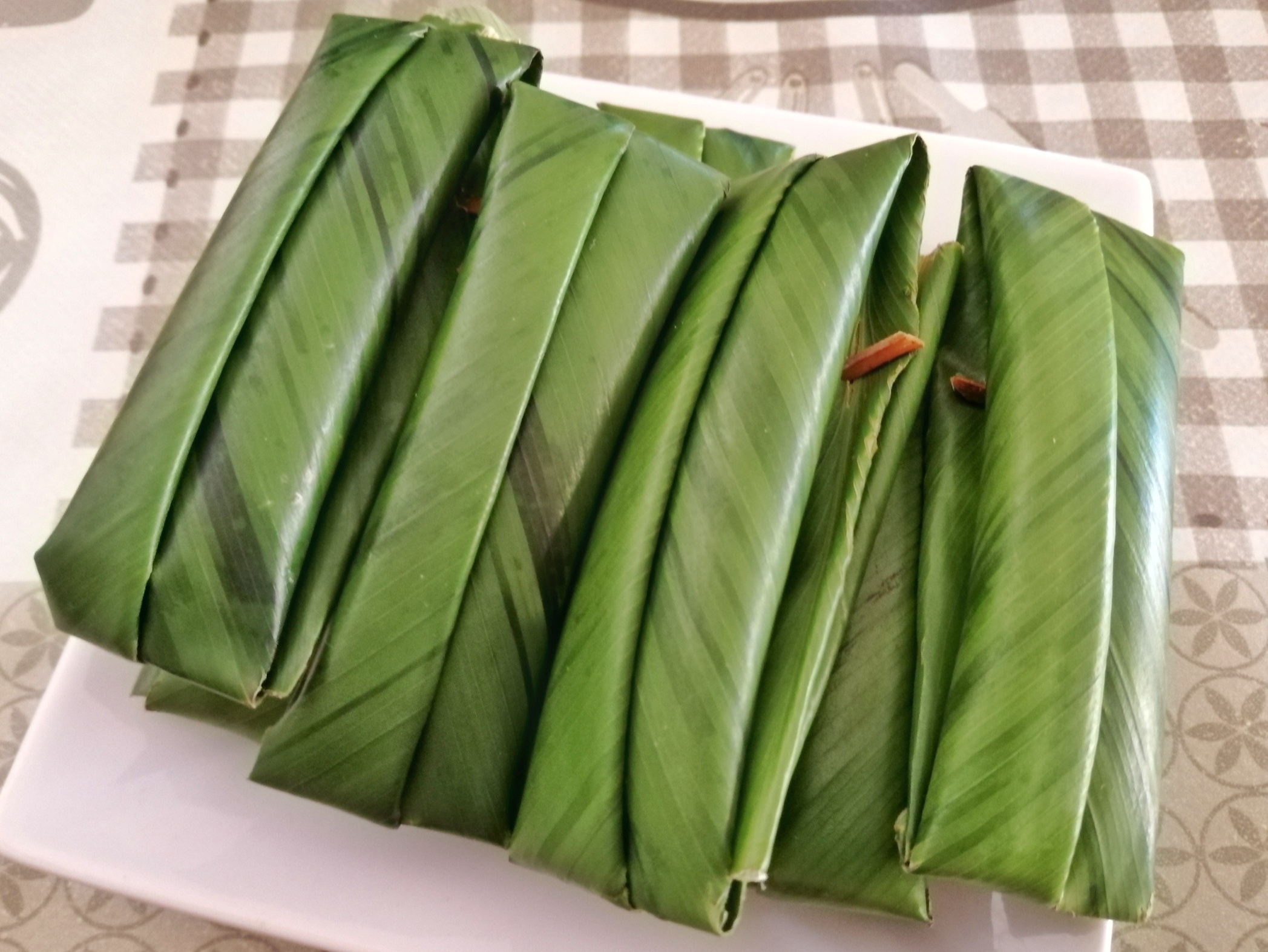
Bruneian kuih wajid wrapped in phacelophrynium maximum (nyirik) leaves similar to the wrapping of kelupis and lamban

- Kuih wajid or wajik – a compressed Malay confection made of glutinous rice cooked with coconut milk and gula melaka.
- Onde onde – small round balls made from glutinous rice flour coloured and flavoured with pandan, filled with palm sugar syrup and rolled in freshly grated coconut.
- Pulut inti – wrapped in banana leaf in the shape of a pyramid, this kuih consists of glutinous rice with a covering of grated coconut candied with palm sugar.
- Pulut panggang – glutinous rice parcels stuffed with a spiced filling, then wrapped in banana leaves and char grilled. Depending on regional tradition, the spiced filling may include pulverised dried prawns, caramelised coconut paste or beef floss. In the state of Sarawak, the local pulut panggang contains no fillings and are wrapped in pandan leaves instead.
- Putu piring – a round steamed cake made of rice flour dough, with a palm sugar sweetened peanut or coconut filling.
- Kuih Bingka Ubi – a baked mixture of grated yellow cassava, eggs, sugar and coconut milk. May contain pandan, and turmeric of yellow food colouring.
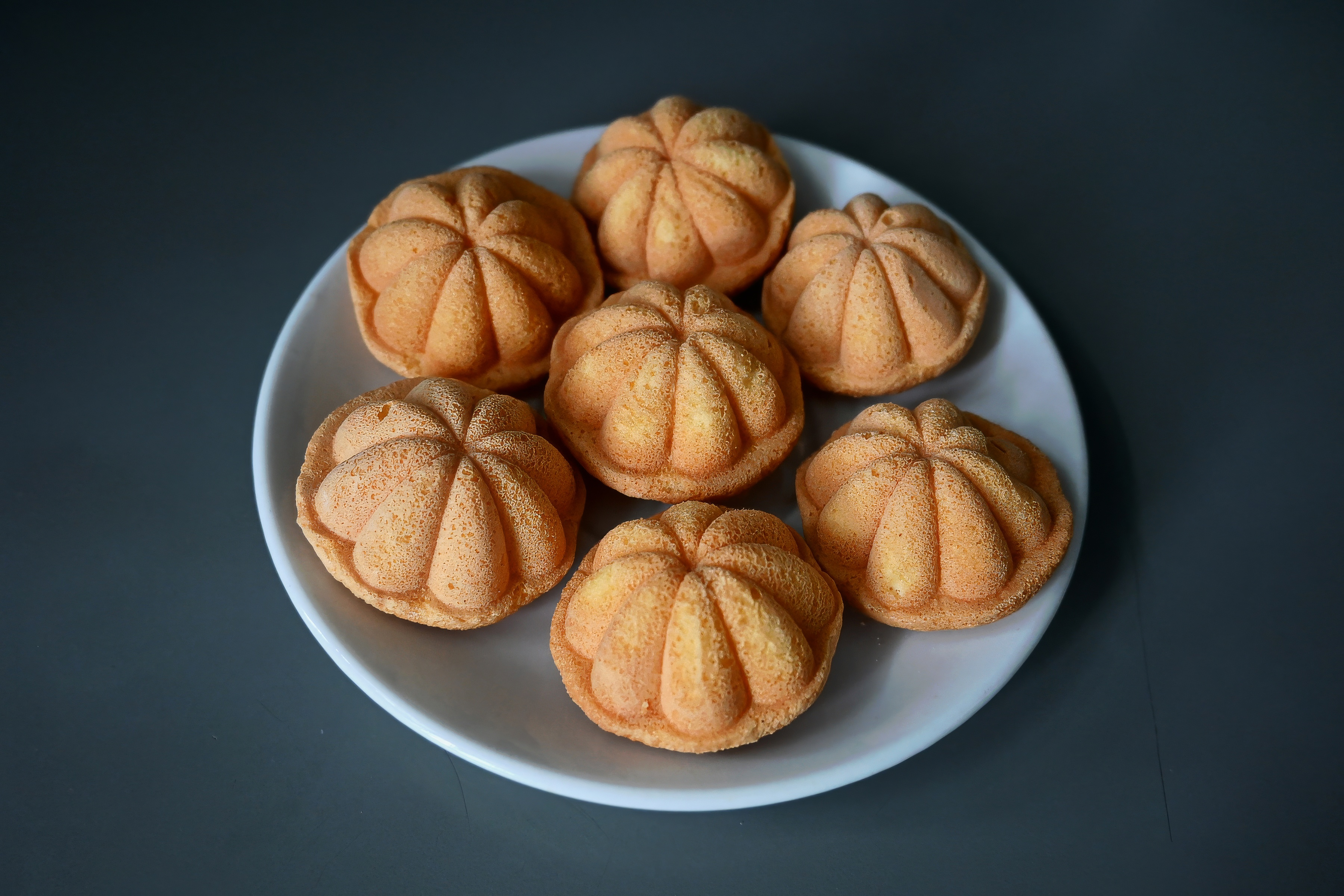
Kuih bahulu

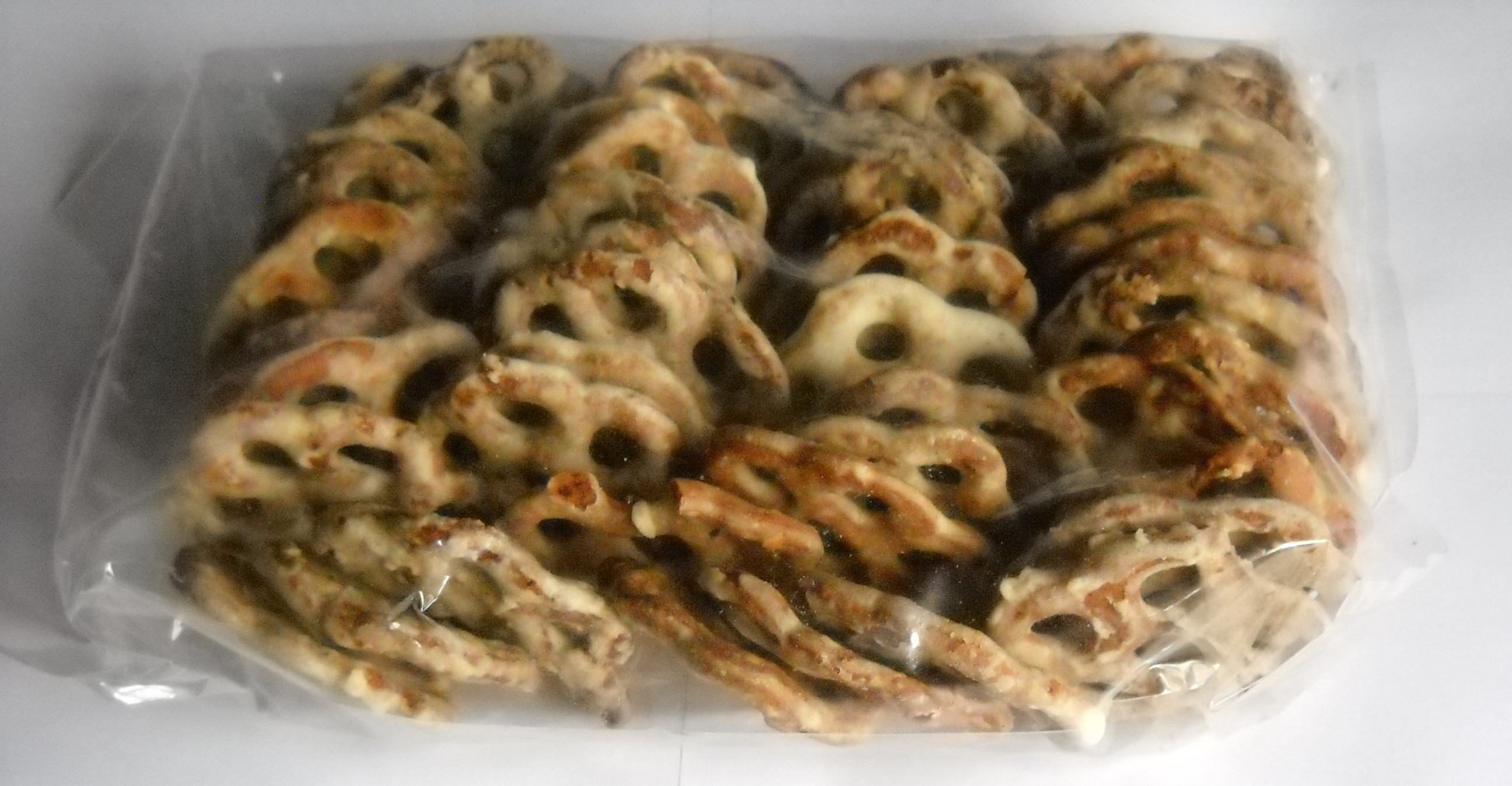
Kuih cincin

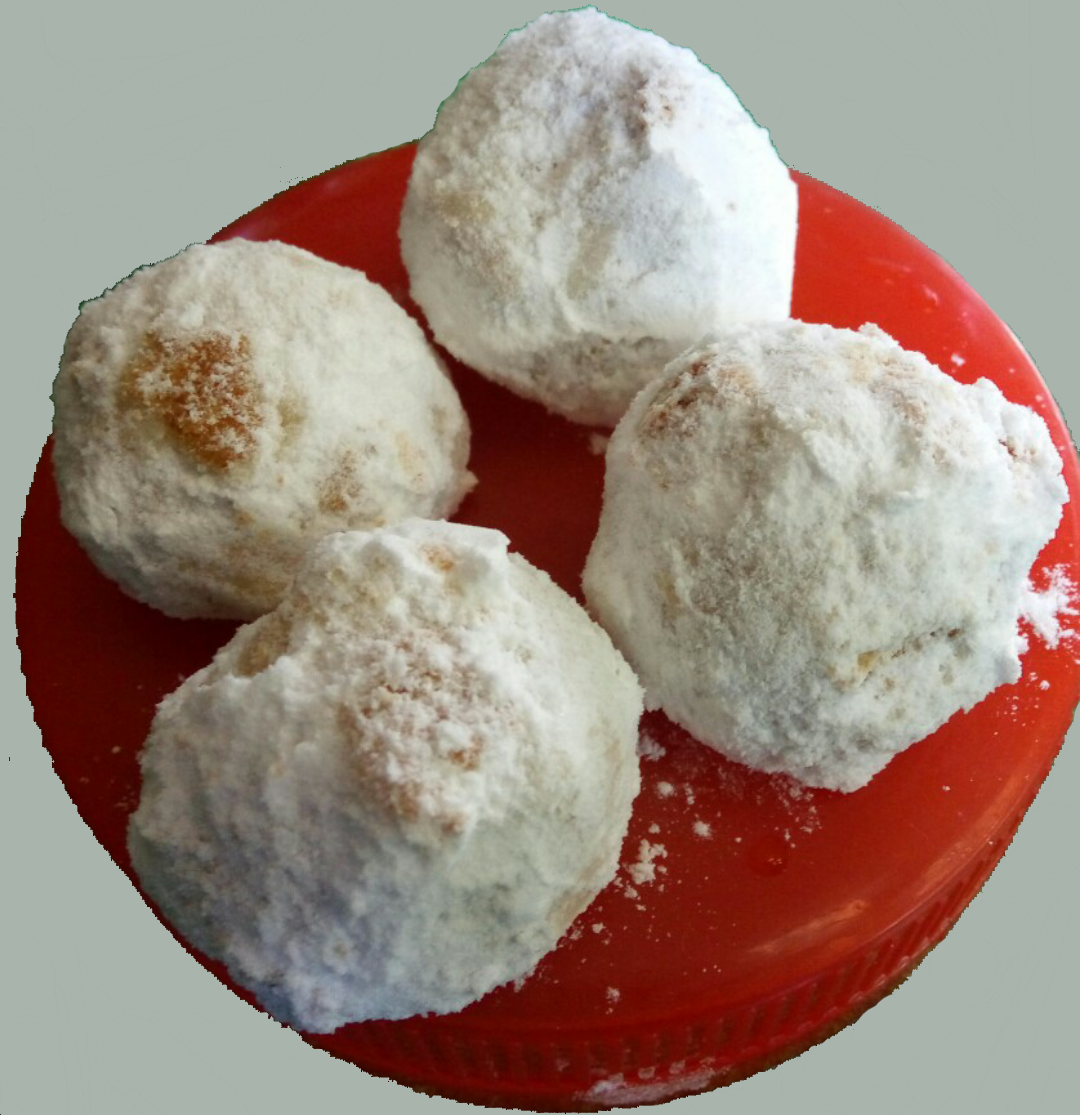
Kuih makmur

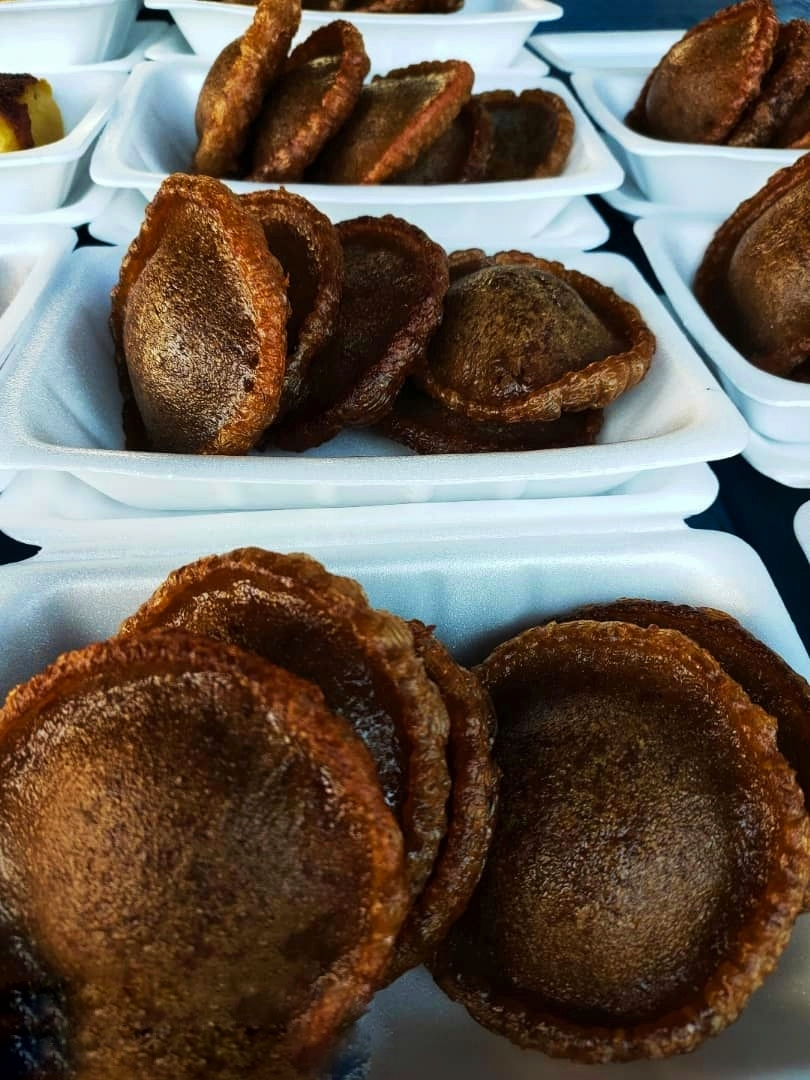
Kuih pinjaram/penyaram

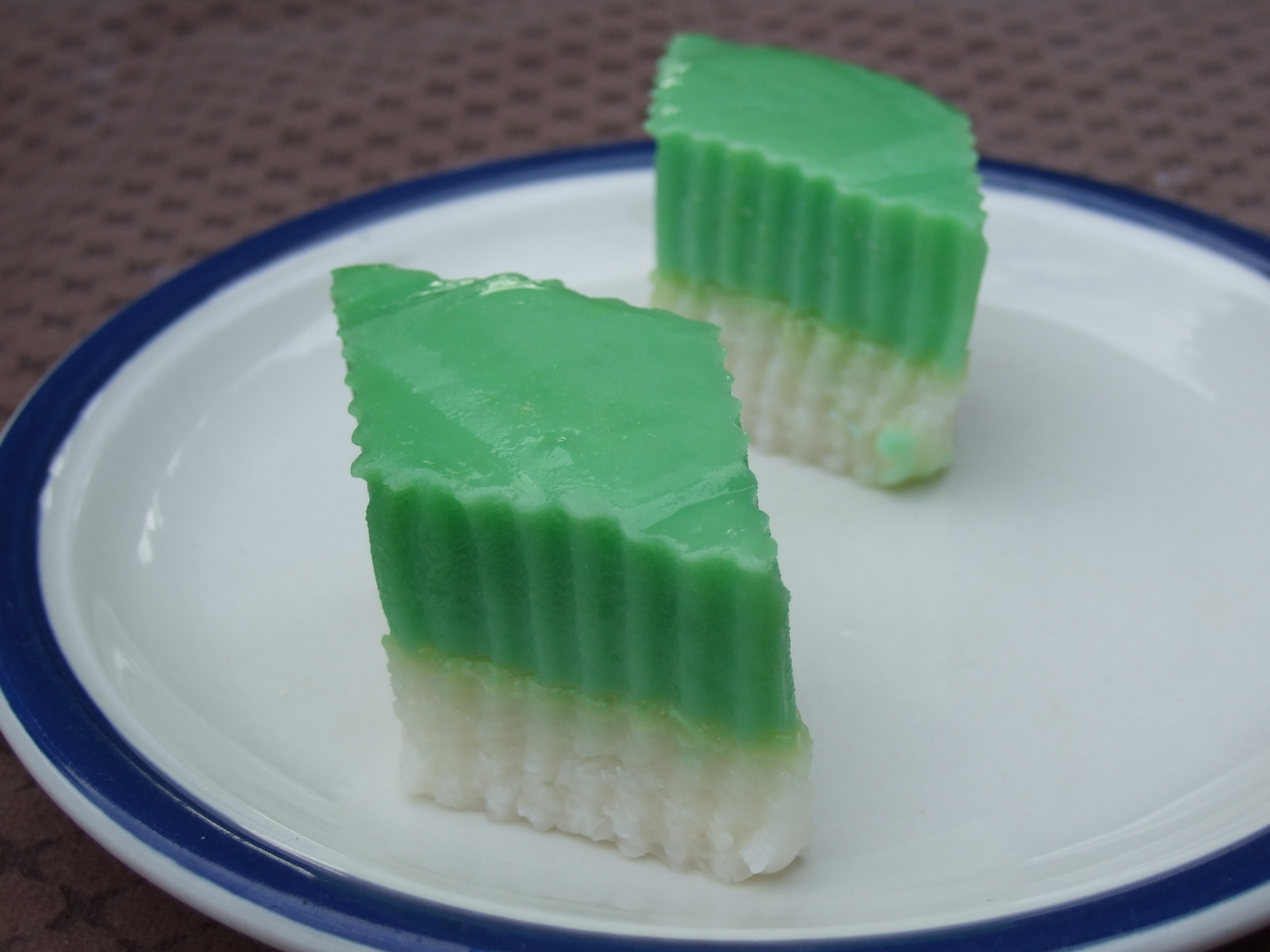
Kuih serimuka

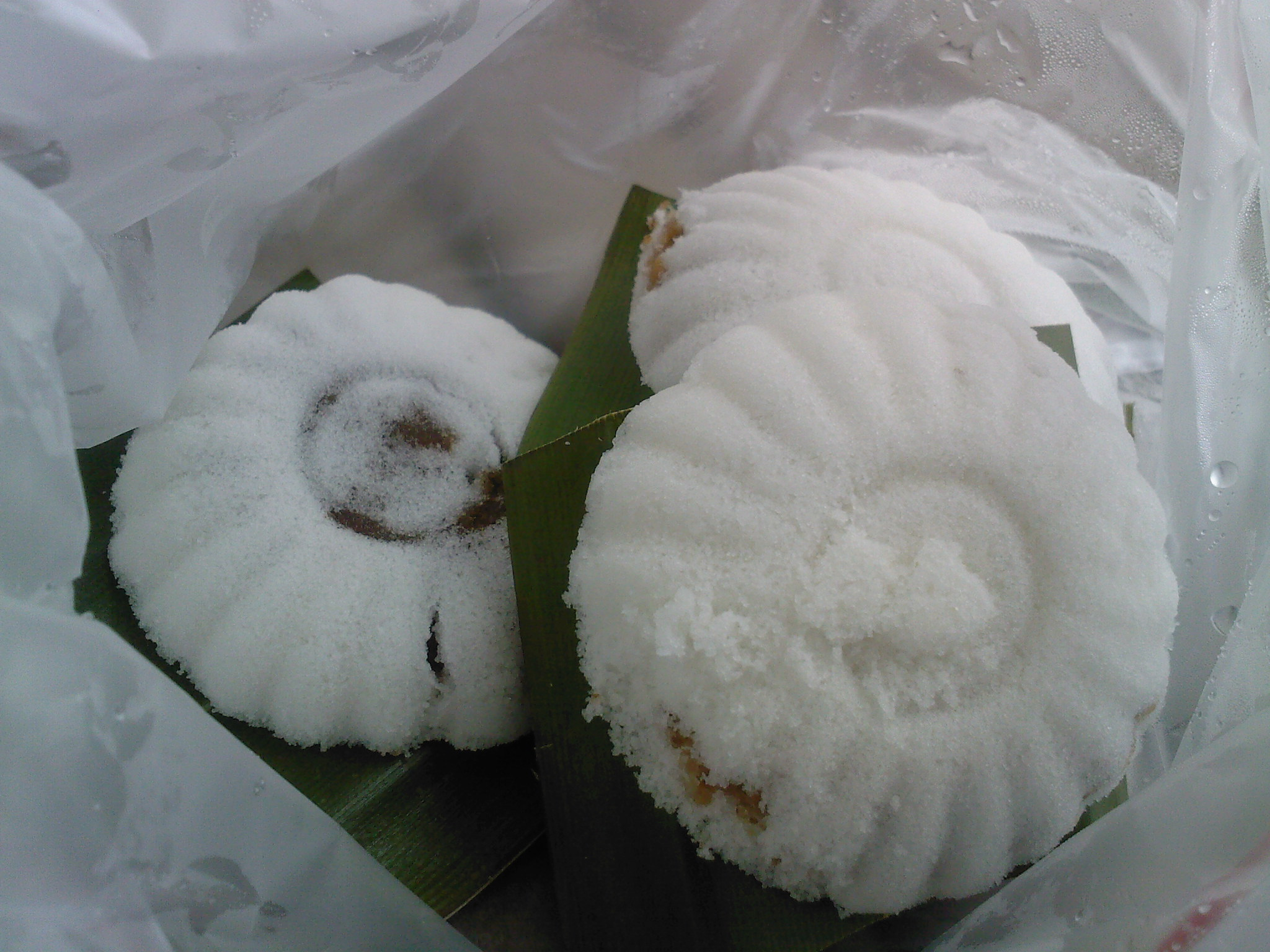
Kueh tutu (or putu piring)

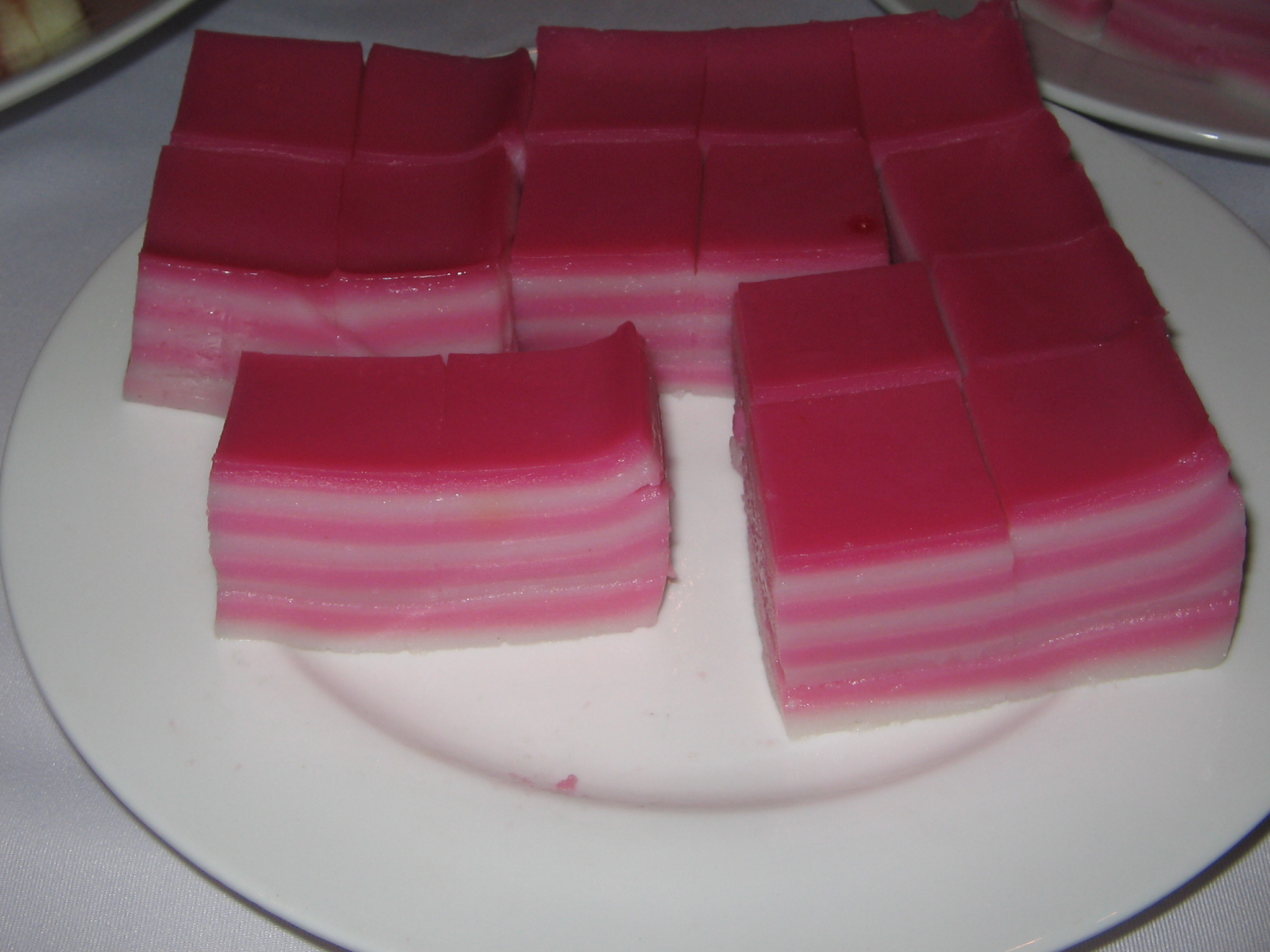
Kuih lapis

=== Chinese kuih ===
- Ang ku kueh (Chinese: 紅龜粿) – a small round or oval shaped Hokkien pastry with red-coloured soft sticky glutinous rice flour skin wrapped around a sweet filling in the centre.
- Chwee kueh (Chinese: 水粿) or wah kueh (Chinese: 碗粿)– Teochew-style steamed bowl-shaped rice cakes topped with diced preserved radish and chilli relish. Popular in Taiwan and within Chinese communities in Southeast Asia.
- Ku chai kueh (Chinese: 韭菜粿) - Teochew-style savoury steamed dumpling stuffed with chives.
- Ti kueh (Chinese: 年糕) or kuih bakul – a brown sticky and sweet rice cake customarily associated with Chinese New Year festivities. It is also available year-round as a popular street food treat, made with pieces of niangao sandwiched between slices of taro and sweet potato, dipped in batter and deep-fried.
- Or kuih (Chinese: 芋粿) – a steamed savoury cake made from pieces of taro (commonly known as "yam" in Malaysia), dried prawns and rice flour. It is then topped with deep fried shallots, spring onions, sliced chilli and dried prawns, and usually served with a chilli dipping sauce.
- Red peach cake (Chinese: 飯粿 png kueh or 紅桃粿 âng-thô-kóe) - Teochew-style savoury steamed dumpling stuffed with glutinous rice. Often dyed pink.
- Soon kueh (Chinese: 笋粿) - Teochew-style savoury steamed dumpling of glutinous rice dough stuffed with jicama, bamboo shoot and dried shrimp.
- Yi buah/buak (Chinese: 意粑) – a Hainanese steamed dumpling made of glutinous rice flour dough. Also known as Kuih E-Pua, it is filled with a palm sugar sweetened mixture of grated coconut, toasted sesame seeds and crushed roasted peanuts, wrapped with sheets of banana leaves pressed into a fluted cup shape, and customarily marked with a dab of red food colouring. This kuih is traditionally served during a wedding and a baby's full-moon celebration.
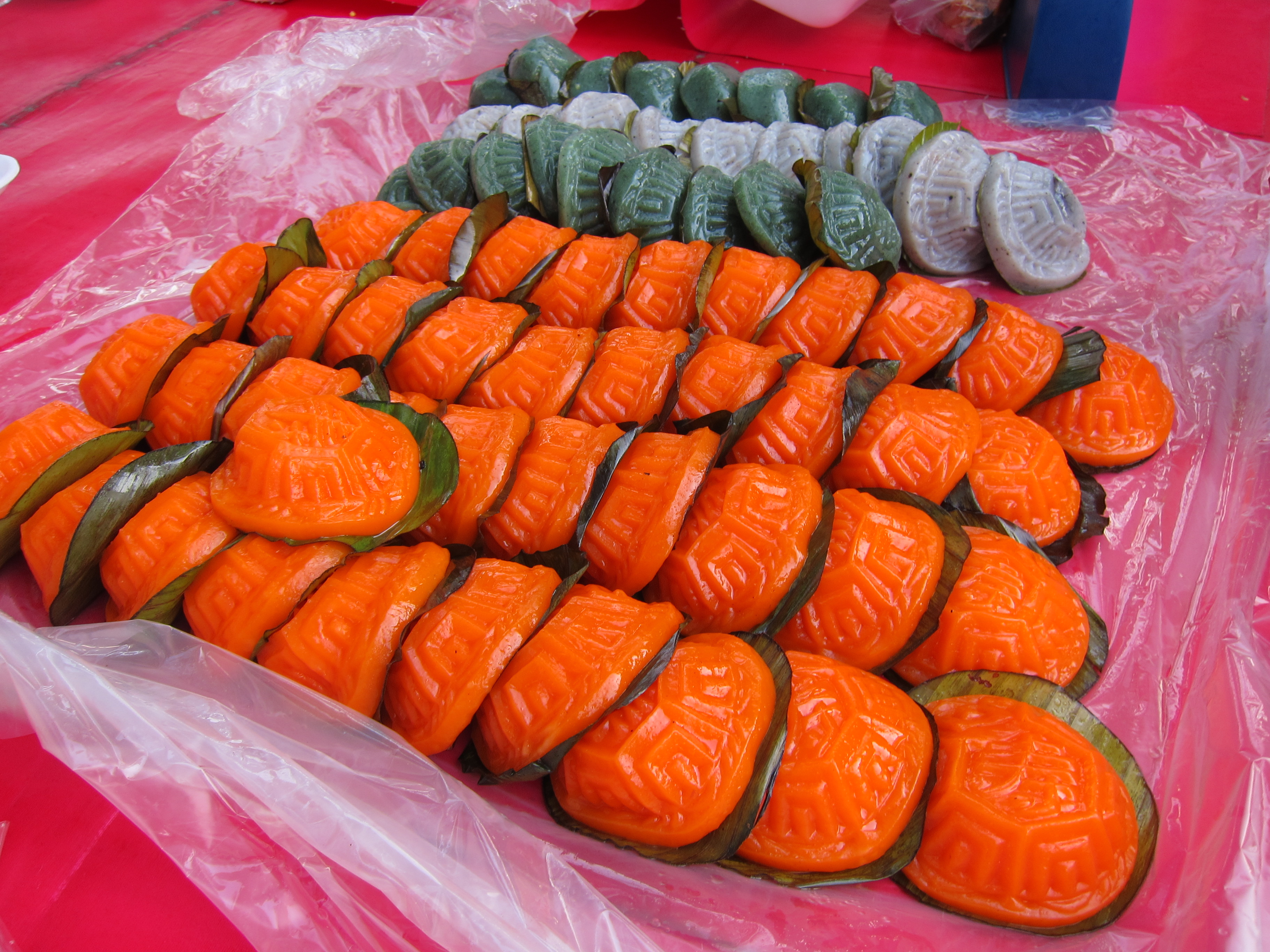
Ang ku kueh in Imbi market, Kuala Lumpur

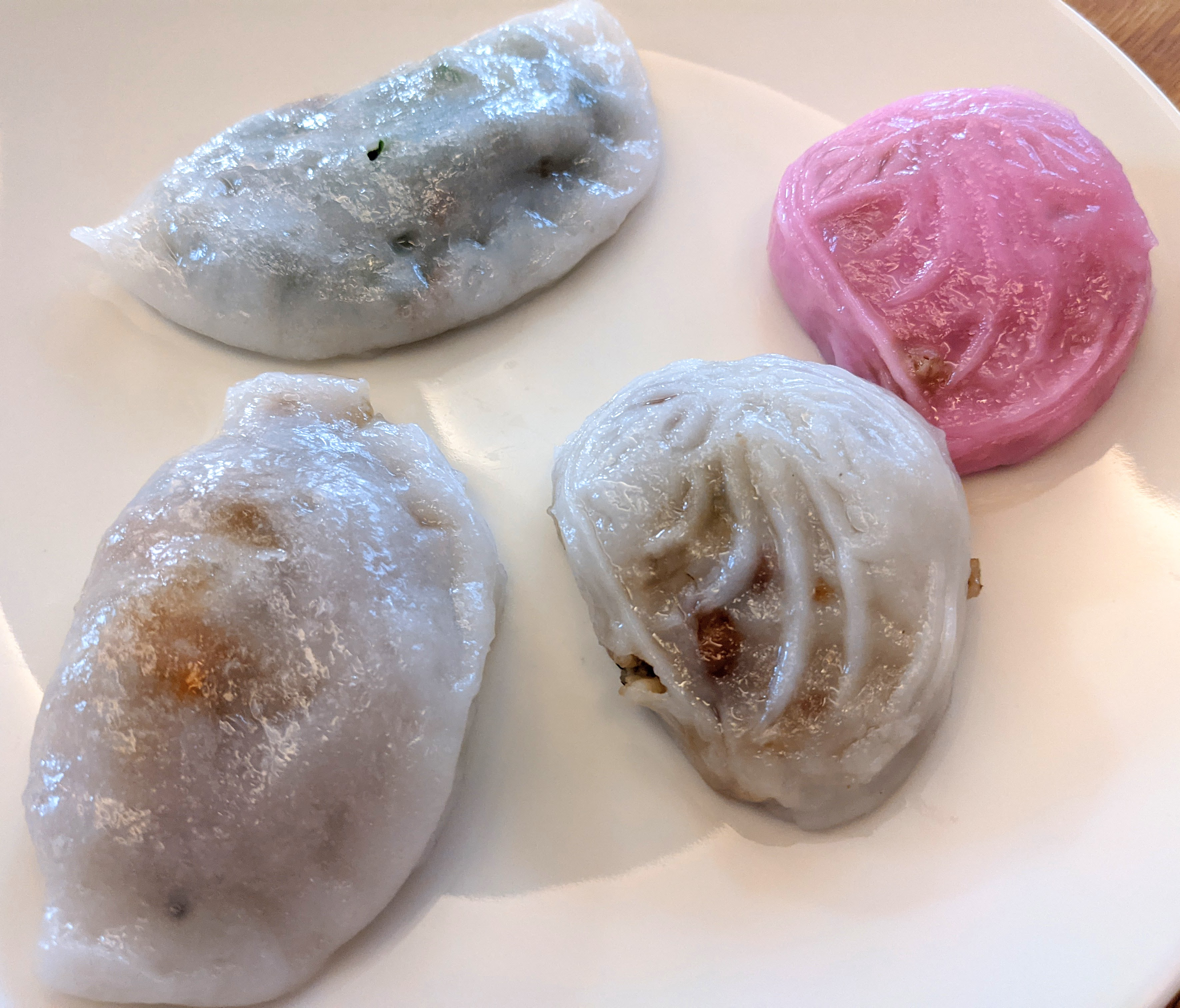
A selection of Teochew-style kueh. Clockwise from top right, two png kueh in pink and white, soon kueh and ku chai kueh.

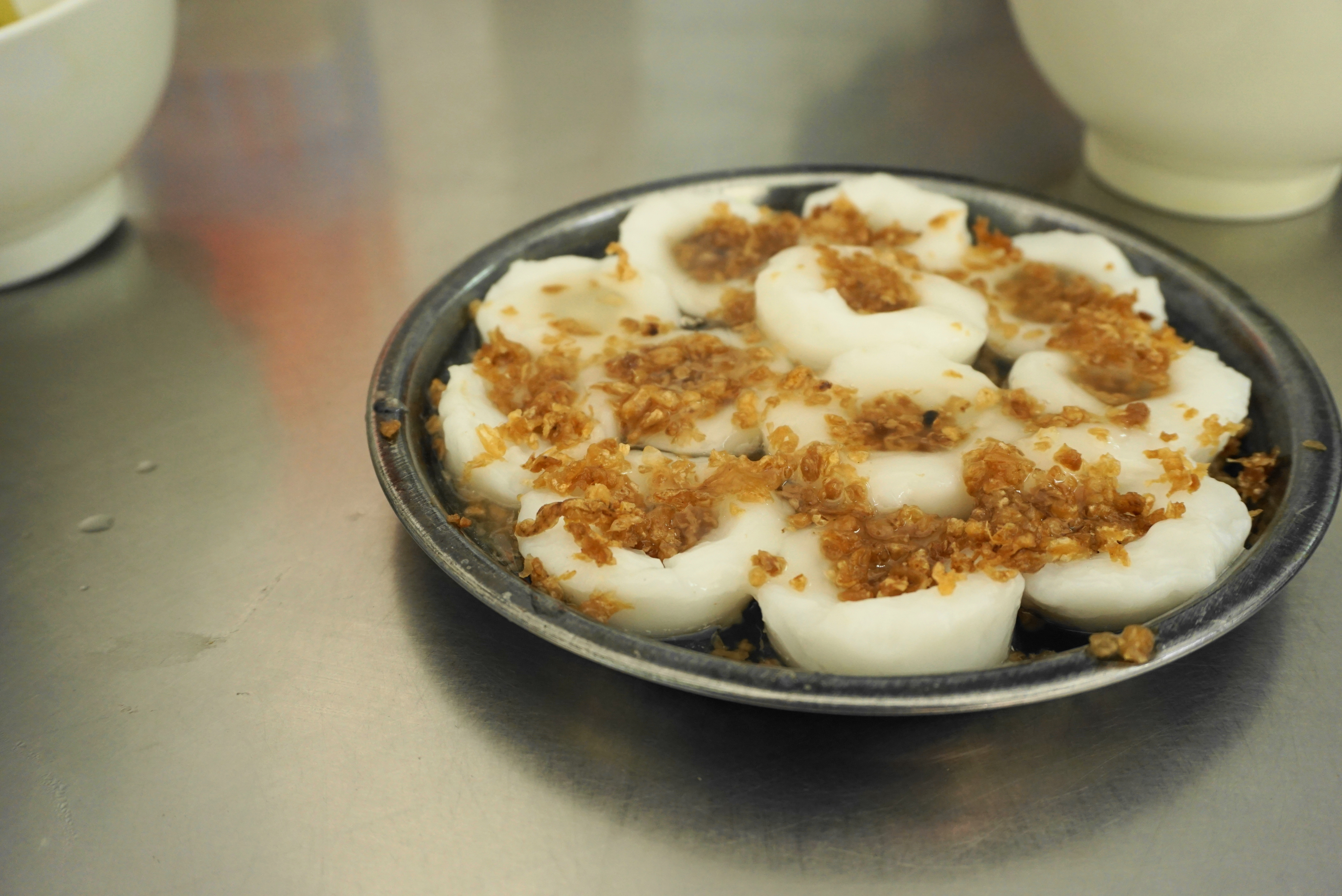
Chwee kueh

=== Indian kuih ===
- Kuih ladu – a sweet dough pastry made of flour, fat and sugar.
- Kuih modak – a rice flour dumpling filled with sweet coconut and jaggery.

== See also ==
- Dodol
- Ketupat
- Lamban
- Lemang
- List of steamed foods
- Kue nagasari
