= Jala (kuih) =

Traditional snack for the Iban people

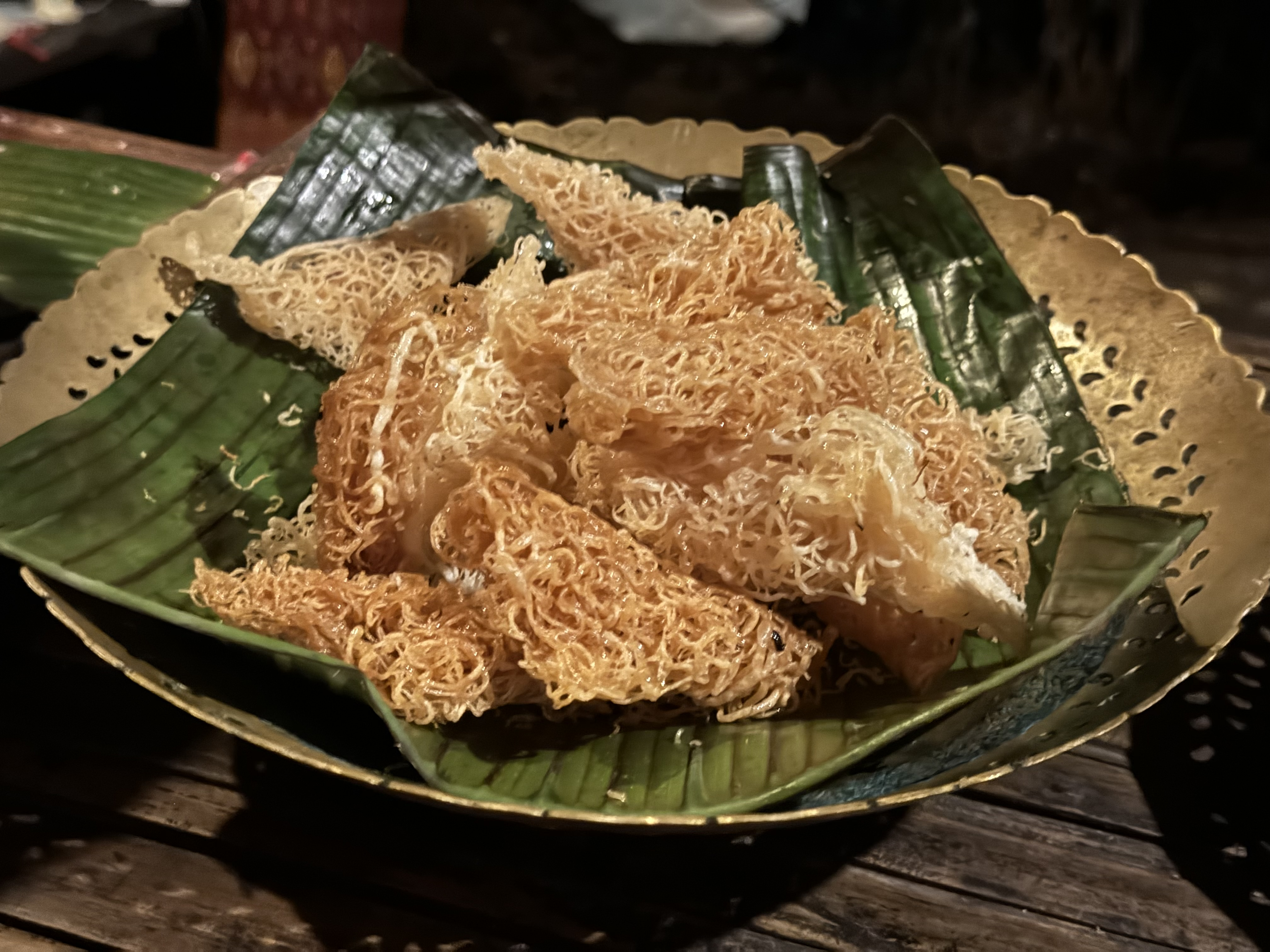
- Kuih jala served at the Mari Mari Cultural Village in Inanam, Kota Kinabalu
- Type: Snack (Kuih)
- Place of origin: Malaysia, Brunei
- Region or state: Sabah, Sarawak
- Created by: Bruneian, Iban, Bajau and Kadazan-Dusun
- Main ingredients: Rice flour, cooking oil, palm sugar

Jala is a traditional kuih from Sabah and Sarawak in Malaysia and Brunei. In Sarawak, it is known as the traditional snack called the "sarang semut" (ant nest) for the Iban people. It is very different from the roti jala in Peninsular Malaysia.

== Gallery ==
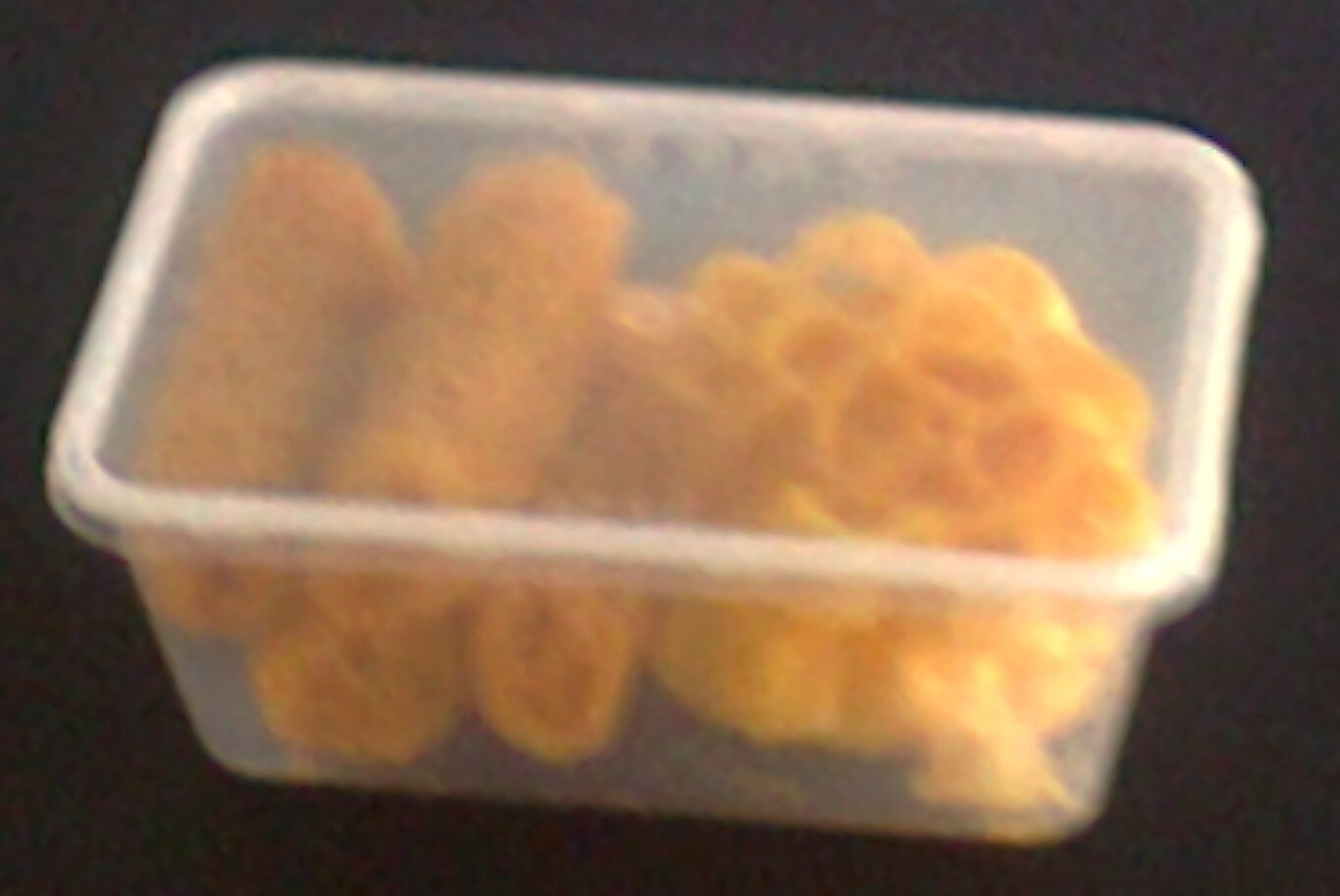
Kuih jala gulung (left) with Kuih goyang (right)

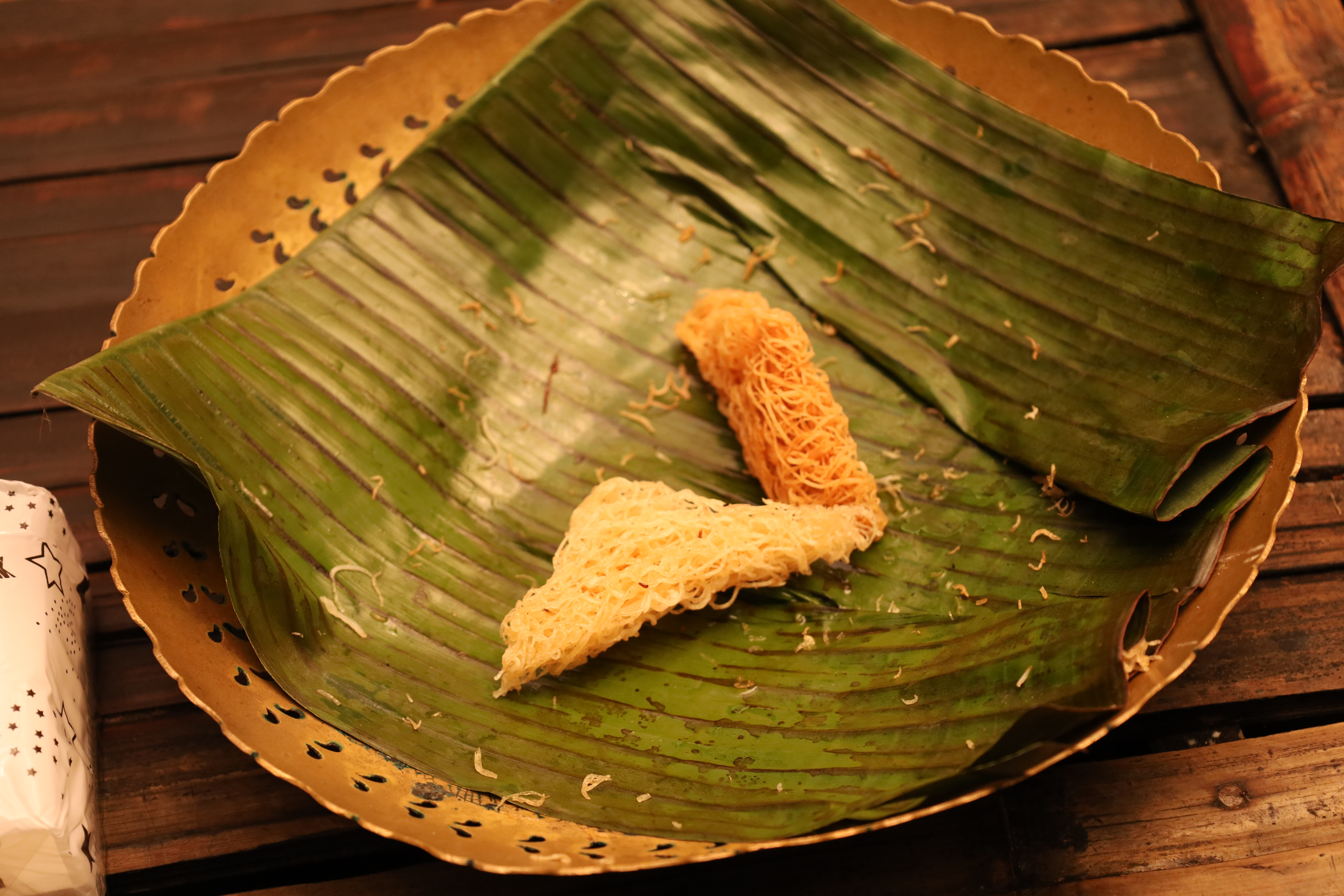
Different shapes of kuih jala
