= Kelupis =

Glutinous rice rolls from Brunei and Malaysia

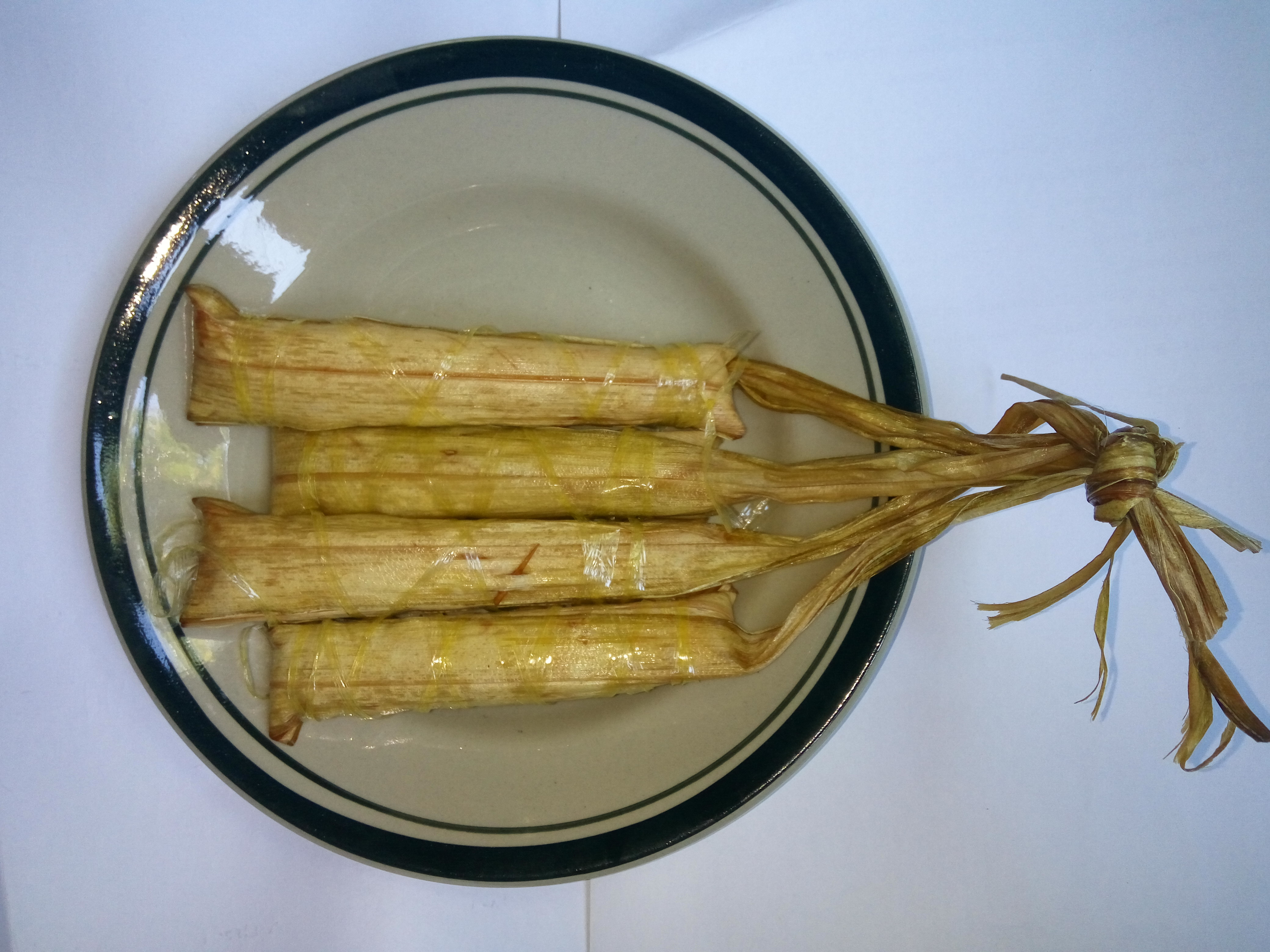
- Kelupis in a licuala grandis leaf wrapper
- Type: Snack (kuih)
- Place of origin: Brunei; East Malaysia
- Region or state: Labuan; Sabah; Sarawak
- Created by: Bruneian Malay; Bisaya; Kedayan; Dusun; Bajau; Lun Bawang/Lundayeh
- Main ingredients: Glutinous rice flour, coconut milk, palm sugar

Kelupis (lit. 'glutinous rice rolls') is a traditional kuih (snack) for the Bisaya, Kedayan, Dusun, Bajau, and Lun Bawang people of East Malaysia and Brunei. Its closest counterparts in West Malaysia are ketupat and lemang. In Brunei, kelupis has been recognised as a national cultural heritage.

Kelupis is commonly eaten within ethnic communities of Sabah and Sarawak during festivities, such as weddings. As it is produced in large quantities, kelupis is usually made communally.

== Preparation ==
Kelupis, which is made from glutinous rice mixed with coconut milk and a little salt, is usually eaten with side dishes such as meat or chicken rendang and curry. The process involves grating old coconut to obtain coconut milk. The glutinous rice is washed and mixed with coconut milk and salt, and the mixture is stirred until it is half cooked. It is then wrapped in phacelophrynium maximum or licuala grandis leaves. Kelupis is eaten on its own or dipped in sauce. Similarly to lamban, it is also commonly served with peanut sauce and rendang.

== Gallery ==
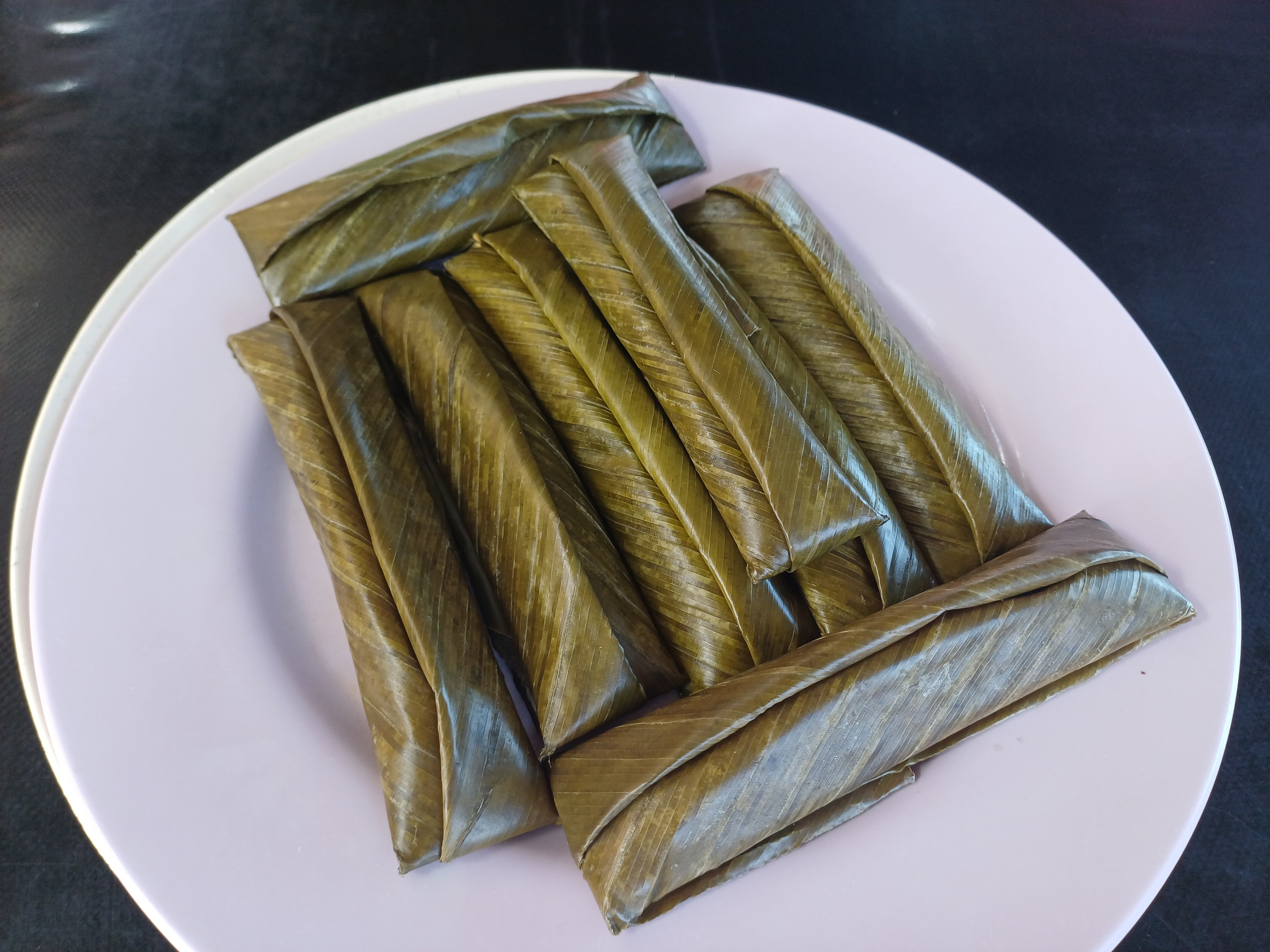
Kelupis wrapped in phacelophrynium maximum leaves

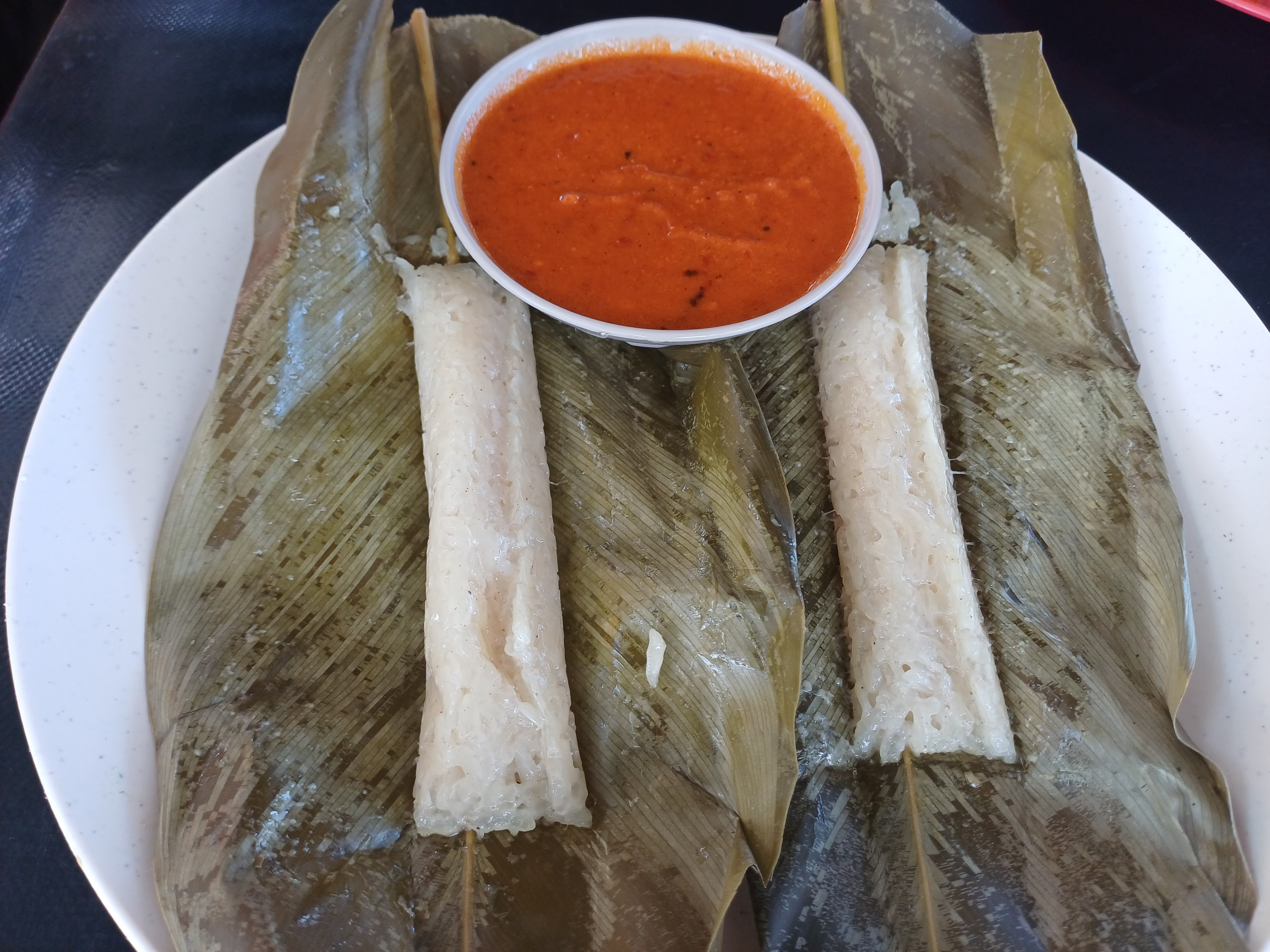
Kelupis after being unwrapped and served with peanut sauce
