= Punjung =

Dessert for the Bruneian Malay people

- Type: Dessert
- Place of origin: Malaysia
- Region or state: Labuan, Sabah
- Created by: Bruneian Malay, Kedayan, Bajau
- Main ingredients: Rice flour

Punjung is a traditional dessert for the Bruneian Malay people and Kedayan in Labuan and in the states of Sabah, Malaysia.
