= Clorot =

Traditional sweet snack

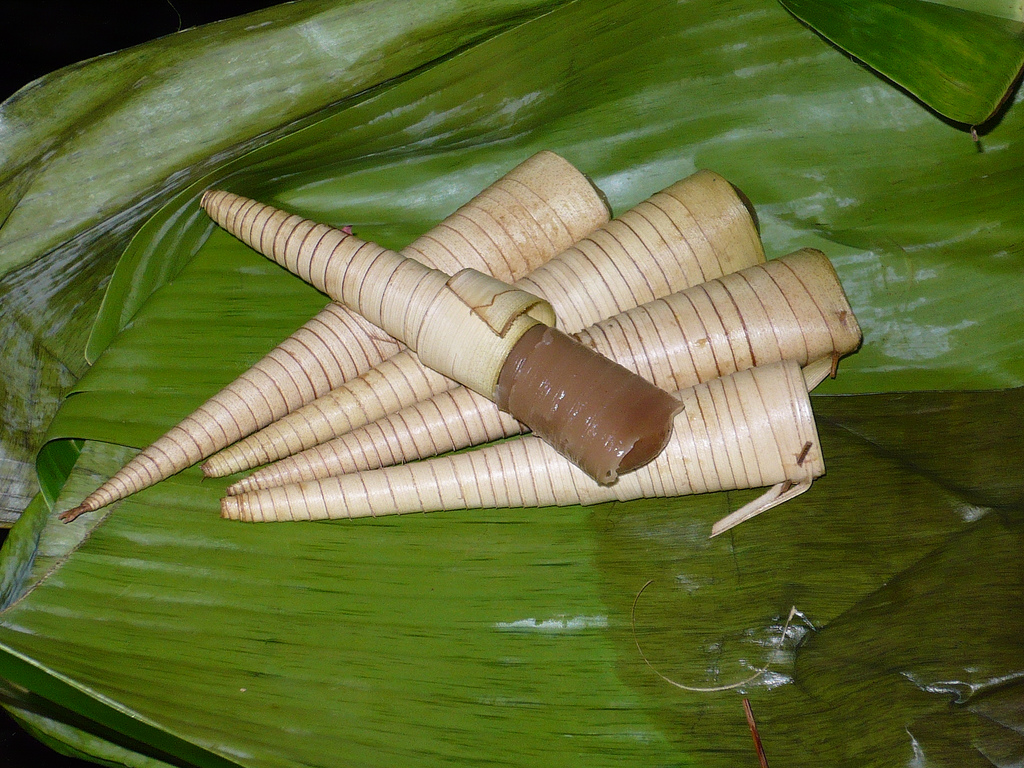
- Cerorot, sweets made of coconut milk and rice flour wrapped in coconut leaves; sold in Bali.
- Alternative names: Celorot, cerorot, jelurut
- Type: Snack (Kue/Kuih)
- Place of origin: Indonesia
- Region or state: Purworejo, Java
- Associated cuisine: Brunei, Indonesia and Malaysia
- Main ingredients: Rice flour, coconut milk, wrapped with young coconut leaf

Clorot, celorot, cerorot, or jelurut is an Indonesian traditional sweet snack (kue or kuih) made of sweet and soft rice flour cake with coconut milk, wrapped with janur or young coconut leaf in cone shape. It is a popular traditional sweet snack commonly found in Brunei, Indonesia, and Malaysia.

In Java, it is known as clorot or celorot, and commonly associated with Javanese traditional jajan pasar (market munchies). In Bali and Lombok islands of Indonesia, it is known as cerorot. In Brunei and in the Malaysian states of Sabah, it is known as celurut or jelurut.

== Ingredients and cooking method ==
Gula jawa (palm sugar), pandan leaf, salt and water are boiled until done and mixed with coconut milk. This sweet liquid then being poured upon rice flour and sago or tapioca flour, and mixed evenly. The janur or young coconut leaf rolled to form a long cone, similar to a small trumpet, secured and arranged upright. The thick-liquid sweet dough then filled into this coconut leaf cones until three-quarter full. Then the top section is filled with the mixture of coconut milk, rice flour and salt. These filled cones then being steamed for about 15 minutes until the dough inside the cone are cooked and hardened.

== See also ==
- List of steamed foods
