= Lamban =

Glutinous rice snack from Brunei and Malaysia

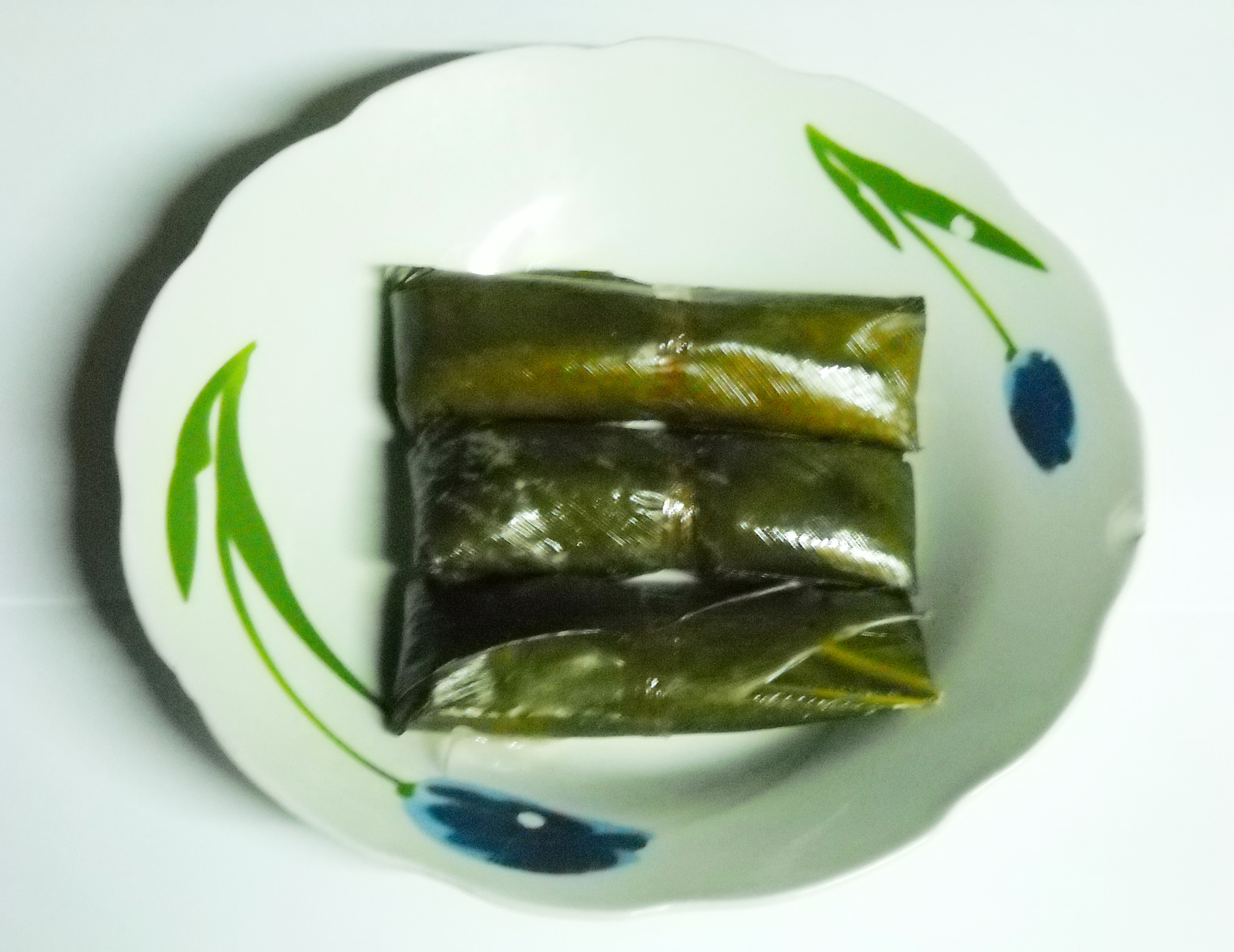
- Lamban in a Kori plate
- Type: Dessert
- Place of origin: Brunei and East Malaysia
- Region or state: Labuan, Sabah
- Created by: Bruneian Malay, Kedayan, Bajau, and Lun Bawang/Lundayeh
- Main ingredients: Glutinous rice

Lamban is a traditional dessert for the Bruneian Malay people, Kedayan, Bajau, and Lun Bawang/Lundayeh in Brunei and in the states and federal territories of Labuan and Sabah, Malaysia. It is also a traditional dessert that is very synonymous with the Sabah's Bajau community influenced by Bruneian culture in Sabah, often served at weddings, feasts, cukur jambul (Aqiqah) ceremonies, and as the main dessert during Eid al-Fitr. In several villages in the Tenom, Beaufort, and Papar districts of Sabah, lamban is considered a symbol of festivity and unity of the local community. The taste of Lamban is almost like the Malays ketupat or the Chinese's rice dumplings and kelupis of the Lun Bawang/Lundayeh.

== See also ==
- Hinompuka
- Kelupis
- Suman (food)
