= Bruneian Malays =

Malay ethnic group in Brunei

Bruneian Malay people
- Malay tricolour

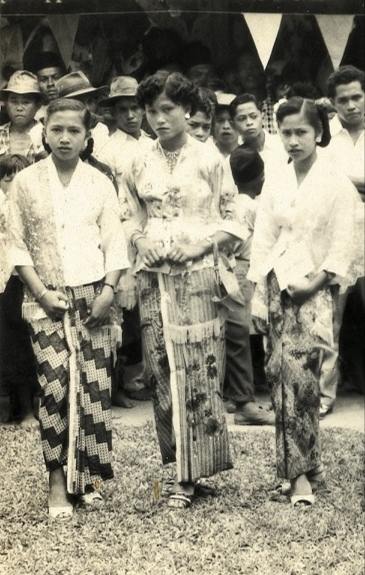
- Three Bruneian Malay women in traditional kebaya and sarongs in colonial interwar British North Borneo, c. 1920s–1930s

Total population
- c. 330,000 (1999 estimate)

Regions with significant populations
- Brunei Malaysia; Sarawak (Miri, Lawas and Limbang); Sabah (Sipitang, Beaufort, Kuala Penyu, Papar, Kota Kinabalu); Labuan

Languages
- Brunei Malay and Standard Malay

Religion
- Sunni Islam (Shafi'i)

Related ethnic groups
- Other Malays, Other Indigenous peoples of Brunei

Bruneian Malays (Malay: Orang Melayu Brunei, Jawi: اورڠ ملايو بروني) are a native Malay ethnic group that lives in Brunei, the federal territory of Labuan, the southwestern coast of Sabah and the northern parts of Sarawak. (Note: Brunei Malay in its various forms can be identified with a nation, an ethnic group and a region.) The Bruneian Malays are a sub-group of the larger ethnic Malay population found in the other parts of the Malay world, namely West Malaysia and the central and southern areas of Sarawak, including neighbouring lands such as Singapore, Indonesia and southern Thailand, having visible differences, especially in language and culture, even though they are ethnically related to each other and adhere to Islam.

All Bruneian Malays who are born or domiciled in East Malaysia even for generations before or after the formation of the Malaysian federation in 1963 are also considered Malaysian Malays in the national census and were in the same status like the Malaysian Malays domiciled in West Malaysian states and the central and southern parts of Sarawak. They are also defined as a part of the Bumiputera racial classification together as a subgroup within the Malaysian Malay ethnic population along with the Kadazan, Dusun, Orang Ulu, Iban, Malaccan Portuguese, Murut, Rungus, Paitan (Orang Sungai), Bajau, Suluk, Melanau and the Malaysian Siamese.

== Etymology ==
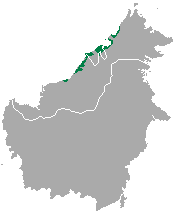
The northwest coast of Borneo, areas with large concentration of Bruneian Malays in Brunei and East Malaysia.

As per an official statistics, the "Bruneian Malays" term only became official after the 1921 Brunei Ethnic Categories Census, which is different from the 1906 and 1911 census which only mentioned "Barunays" (Brunei's or Bruneian). It is possibly indicated a shift on the self-perception by the Bruneians about their Malay identity. The earliest recorded documentation by the West about Brunei is by an Italian known as Ludovico di Varthema, who also said the "Bruneian people have fairer skin tone than the peoples he met in Maluku Islands". On his documentation back to 1550;

We arrived at the island of Bornei (Brunei or Borneo), which is distant from the Maluch about two hundred miles, and we found that it was somewhat larger than the aforesaid and much lower. The people are pagans and are men of goodwill. Their colour is whiter than that of the other sort....in this island justice is well administered.

Some historians, such as Liu Yingsheng and Pengiran Karim Pengiran Osman, have suggested that Bruneian Malay has been linked with mainland China due to its extensive historical sources dependent on Chinese records, such as the Book of Liang of the Liang dynasty from the 6th century, which is much older than the Bruneian sultanate in the 14th century, which describes early Brunei kingdom relations with symbiotic relationships, early maritime trade, diplomacy, and people movements from the southern area of China.

== History ==
=== Origin ===
It is widely believed that the Brunei kingdom was founded in 14th century by the first Sultan, Alak Batatar. However, from the Chinese records, an older Brunei was in existence as far back as 800 years before the founding of Brunei by Sultan Muhammad Shah, the first Sultan of Brunei. Even though some sources stated that the Malays of Brunei came from Yunnan and the Formosa Island (now Taiwan) through to the Philippines and settled on the coastal Borneo before expanding into Sumatra and Indochinese countries like Malay Peninsula, Thailand, Cambodia and Vietnam as a result of their trading and seafaring way of life, researchers are still unable to trace the origin of the old Brunei.

== Cultures ==
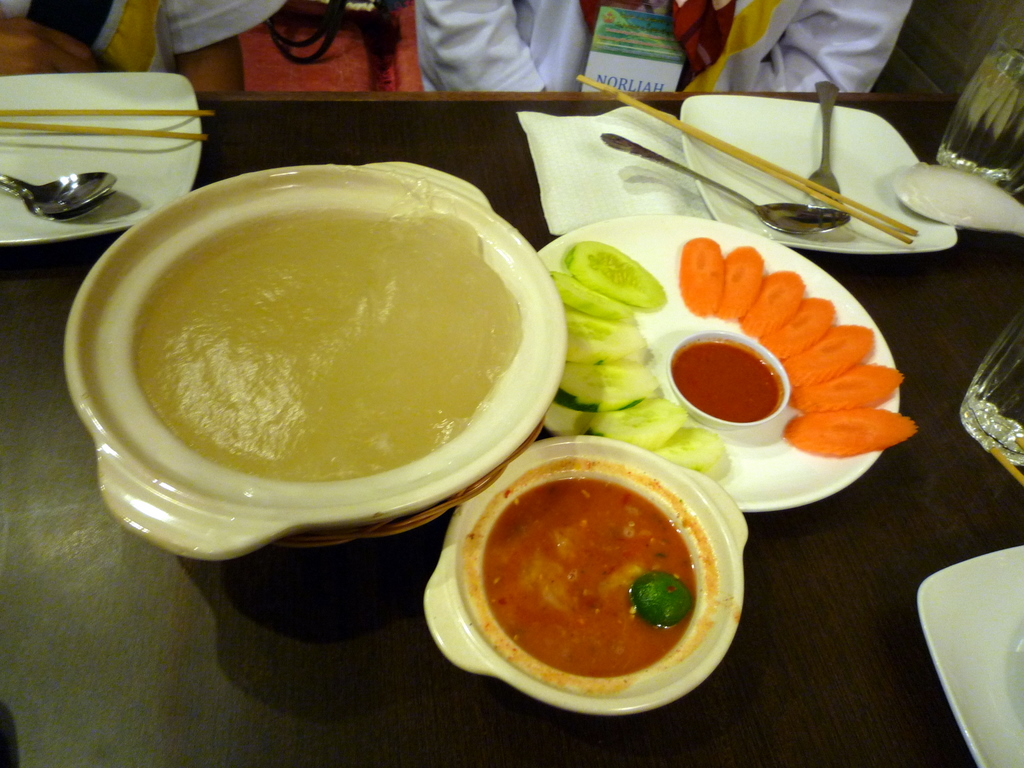
Ambuyat, a quintessentially Bruneian Malay cuisine, it is considered as the national dish of the country.

=== Cuisine ===
As the official Brunei national dish, the Ambuyat is the main dish of the Bruneian Malays together with a number of types of snack such as lamban, punjung and many more.

=== Music ===
The main song and dance performed by this ethnic both in Brunei and Malaysia is the Adai-adai, which was traditionally sung by the Bruneian fishermens.

== See also ==
- Brunei Malay
- Brunei Malay wedding
- Kedayan
- Bisaya
- Murut
