= Burford Capital =

Finance and professional services company

- Type: Public
- Traded as: LSE: BUR; NYSE: BUR
- Industry: Financial services
- Founded: 2009
- Founders: Christopher Bogart; Jonathan Molot
- Headquarters: Guernsey
- Key people: Christopher Bogart (CEO); Jonathan Molot (CIO)
- Products: Litigation finance
- Revenue: ▼US$413 million (2025)
- Net income: ▼US$62.6 million (2025)
- Website: burfordcapital.com

Burford Capital is a financial services company that provides specialized financing to the legal market. Founded in 2009, it offers financing to corporate legal departments and law firms engaged in litigation and arbitration, asset recovery and other legal financing such as law firm equity investments. It operates internationally with headquarters in Guernsey and is publicly traded on both the New York Stock Exchange and London Stock Exchange.

== History ==
Burford was founded by Christopher Bogart and Jonathan Molot in 2009 as a way to fund commercial litigation and arbitration. Bogart had worked as general counsel for Time Warner and operated a venture capital fund, and Molot operated a firm that provided capital to companies at risk of litigation. Burford began as a small fund that initially helped corporate legal departments pay their lawyers' billable hours during litigation.

Burford became publicly traded on the London AIM Stock Exchange in October 2009 and issued further shares in a follow-on in 2010. In December 2016, Burford purchased Gerchen Keller Capital, another legal finance company.

In 2019, Burford responded to a short attack by Muddy Waters Research that claimed financial inaccuracies. The same year, the company replaced its chief financial officer, the spouse of the chief executive officer. On 12 August 2019, Burford alleged it had identified evidence consistent with “illegal market manipulation” of its shares in the run up to the short attack.

Buford became listed on the New York Stock Exchange in 2020. It also acquired a 32 percent equity stake in the UK-based litigation firm PCB Litigation the same year.

On 21 June 2021, Burford announced it had successfully been paid $103m USD, resulting from the enforcement of a judgment in the divorce suit between Russian businessman Farkhad Akhmedov and Tatiana Akhmedova. Bloomberg reported the total settlement amount was £135m. Burford Capital was successful in financing the enforcement of the judgment in the divorce litigation.

Burford financed litigation surrounding the renationalization of YPF, where in 2023 $16.1 billion in damages was awarded against Argentina on behalf of two minority shareholders of YPF. Burford's share of the verdict was estimated at $6 billion, with Burford seeking shares in YPF as payment on the judgement. On March 27, 2026, a U.S. Appeals Court overturned the decision against Argentina.

In 2023, Sysco assigned its claims to Burford in anti-trust lawsuits for price fixing. Sysco originally brought the suits against chicken, beef, pork and turkey suppliers. Burford had funded $140 million of the litigation beginning in 2019 and was later in a dispute with Sysco over settlements with the suppliers. It sued Burford, alleging Burford was interfering with the settlements. Sysco had previously assigned a substantial portion of the claims in breach of its agreement with Burford.

In 2025, Burford made a minority investment in Kindleworth, a London-based consultancy.
