= Commissioner v. Tufts =

- Supreme Court of the United States

Argued November 29, 1982 Decided May 2, 1983
- Full case name: Commissioner of Internal Revenue v. John F. Tufts, et al.
- Citations: 461 U.S. 300 (more) 103 S. Ct. 1826, 75 L. Ed. 2d 863

Case history
- Prior: 70 T.C. 756 (1978), reversed by 651 F.2d 1058 (5th Cir. 1981)

Holding
- When a taxpayer sells or disposes of property encumbered by a nonrecourse obligation exceeding the fair market value of the property sold, the Commissioner may require him to include in the “amount realized” the outstanding amount of the obligation.

Court membership
- Chief Justice Warren E. Burger Associate Justices William J. Brennan Jr. · Byron White; Thurgood Marshall · Harry Blackmun; Lewis F. Powell Jr. · William Rehnquist; John P. Stevens · Sandra Day O'Connor

Case opinions
- Majority: Blackmun, joined by unanimous
- Concurrence: O'Connor

Laws applied
- 26 U.S.C. § 1001(b)

Commissioner v. Tufts, 461 U.S. 300 (1983), was a unanimous decision by the United States Supreme Court, which held that when a taxpayer sells or disposes of property encumbered by a nonrecourse obligation exceeding the fair market value of the property sold, the Commissioner of Internal Revenue may require him to include in the “amount realized” the outstanding amount of the obligation; the fair market value of the property is irrelevant to this calculation.

== Facts ==
Taxpayers borrowed $1,851,500 on a non-recourse basis to build an apartment complex. Later, they sold the complex for no consideration other than the assumption of the non-recourse liability.

At the time of the sale, the fair market value of the property was $1,400,000, and their basis in the property was $1,455,740 (i.e.: the $1,851,500 which they borrowed, plus their invested capital of $44,212, minus deductions taken in the amount of $439,972.)

The taxpayers argued that their tax consequences should equal the excess of fair market value over basis. If so, they would have a loss of $55,740.

The Tax Commissioner argued that the tax should equal the excess of the principal amount of debt over basis. If so, then the taxpayers actually realized a gain of $400,000.

== Issue ==
How should the tax court deal with the transfer of non-recourse mortgage debt in property dispositions when the fair market value of the property is less than the property's basis?

== Opinion ==
The Court began by noting that all gains or losses on the disposition of property must be realized, under section 1001(a) of the Internal Revenue Code. The definition for “amount realized,” found in 1001(b), states “the amount realized from the sale or other disposition of property shall be the sum of any money received plus the fair market value of the property (other than money) received.”

The Court considered, and ultimately reaffirmed, the holding of a previous opinion rendered in Crane v. Commissioner; specifically that the phrase “amount realized” must include the amount of mortgage debt liability transferred.

The Court specifically noted that the fair market value of the property at the time of disposition is irrelevant. Further, the nature of the loan (recourse or non-recourse) is also insignificant for purposes of determining basis. The Court defended its position by observing that the stated requirements force a taxpayer to account for the proceeds of obligations he has received tax-free and included in the property's basis. A finding otherwise would allow a mortgagee to recognize a tax loss without suffering a corresponding economic loss.

In applying the opinion's statement of law to the present facts, the Court concluded that the taxpayers’ disposition of property realized a gain of approximately $400,000; not their claim of a $55,740 loss.

== See also ==
- List of United States Supreme Court cases, volume 331
- Taxation in the United States
