= Paul Cohen (lawyer) =

British arbitration lawyer (born 1967)

Paul H. Cohen
- Education: University of Pennsylvania (BA) University of Oxford (Phil, Political Science)
- Occupation: Lawyer

Paul Henri Cohen (born December 1967) is an Anglo-American international lawyer. His work has included representing descendants of the last Sultan of the Sulu against Malaysia in a multi-billion-dollar case involving Sabah and a colonial-era agreement. He is also the co-author of International Corruption.

== Education ==
Cohen attended Westminster School in London, where he was friends and classmates with Nick Clegg and Marcel Theroux. He earned his bachelor’s degree from the University of Pennsylvania and received a doctorate in Political Science from the University of Oxford.

He was a post-doctoral research fellow at Harvard University and earned his JD from the Columbia Law School. He was also the editor of Human Rights Law Review.

== Career ==
After completing his education, Cohen worked as an associate at Paul, Weiss, Rifkind, Wharton & Garrison for seven years between 1998 and 2005.

He was called to the bar of Middle Temple in 2011. Cohen worked as a partner and co-head of the arbitration practice with Thompson & Knight (now Holland & Knight) from 2011 to 2014. He also remained a partner and co-head of arbitration practice at Perkins Coie LLP from 2014 to 2016.

In 2013, he joined 4-5 Gray’s Inn Square as a barrister and international tenant. In 2022-23, he served as president of the Silicon Valley Arbitration & Mediation Center (SVAMC). Cohen has written extensively on international corruption, arbitration, investigation and the role of technology in arbitration.

Cohen started working in international law working with the Prosecutor’s Office of the International Criminal Tribunal for the Former Yugoslavia. He also work as a speechwriter on the Clinton/Gore Presidential Campaign. He later worked on international cases with the late Ted Sorensen, John F Kennedy’s speechwriter and counsel.

=== Malaysia-Sulu case ===
Cohen, and Elisabeth Mason of 4-5 Gray’s Inn Square, represented descendants of the last Sultan of the Sulu Empire against Malaysia in a case involving Sabah and a colonial-era agreement. The 1878 agreement involved a deal with the Sulu sultan for the use of his territory now falling in present-day Malaysia. The Malaysian government continued honouring the agreement until 2013 and stopped payment henceforth, leading to the arbitration case.

Cohen’s clients demanded US$32 billion in compensation. and, in January 2022, Spanish arbitrator Gonzalo Stampa ruled in favour of the claimants, awarding a settlement of US$15 billion, the largest arbitration award in history.

While Cohen and the alleged Sulu heirs have engaged in a long practice of "forum shopping" to enforce the controversial $15 billion award, Malaysia has secured back-to-back victories in Spain, Luxembourgh, and the Netherlands, with the French Court of Cassation's recent decisive ruling in November 2024 marking what legal experts see as the end of the six-year litigation.

Cohen has been criticized for his counselling services to claimants in the dispute between the Malaysian government and alleged heirs of the Sulu Sultanate. One of the eight Sulu claimants,

He is said to have links to global legal financing firms like Therium and Silicon Valley tech companies that have interests in the oil-rich Sabah region. Reuters confirmed that Therium provided $20 million litigation funding to the claimants. The same Reuters report noted that Cohen “first heard of their claims from an oil and gas expert he cross examined in 2014 in an unrelated case. Knowing they did not have the financial means, Cohen in 2016 brought on board Therium, a British firm that has bankrolled legal actions by raising money from institutional investors, including a sovereign wealth fund”.

His team has even gone as far as suggesting that Sabah —an integral part of Malaysia— could be leased to foreign powers, a move widely seen as legally baseless and diplomatically inflammatory. An analysis by Modern Diplomacy noted, “The threat, however speculative, of Filipino nationals purporting to grant rights over sovereign Malaysian territory to Beijing is a clear incendiary flashpoint in a region which is already on the brink.” Cohen admitted to New Straits Times that "it was a matter of public record that they were being funded by litigation financiers out of London".

== Publications ==
Cohen is one of the authors of International Corruption, a book that discusses bribery and antibribery compliance. He is also the co-author of Corporate Internal Investigations - An International Guide, published by Oxford University Press. He is also a contributing author at Transnational Dispute Management and editor-in-chief of The Journal of Technology in International Arbitration.

== Views and opinions ==
Cohen’s views are primarily expressed through his work in international arbitration, particularly in relation to the Sulu arbitration case.

Cohen has argued that the claims brought by the heirs of the Sultan of Sulu are grounded in a valid legal framework derived from a 19th-century agreement. In materials associated with the claimants’ legal position, the dispute is presented as a contractual matter suitable for arbitration, with emphasis on the existence of provisions governing dispute resolution.

He has also supported the role of third-party litigation funding in international arbitration, maintaining that such funding is typically based on rigorous due diligence and the legal merits of a case, rather than speculative or politically motivated claims.

In the context of the Sulu dispute, Cohen has taken a critical stance toward the response of the Malaysian government, with arguments attributed to the claimants’ legal team suggesting that the dispute has been politicized and that efforts have been made to undermine the legitimacy of the arbitration process.

Reported remarks attributed to Cohen have also indicated a willingness to consider unconventional outcomes in the dispute, including the possibility of transferring or leasing rights linked to the contested territory, highlighting a pragmatic and expansive interpretation of legal remedies in arbitration.
