= Elisabeth Mason =

American lawyer & venture philanthropist

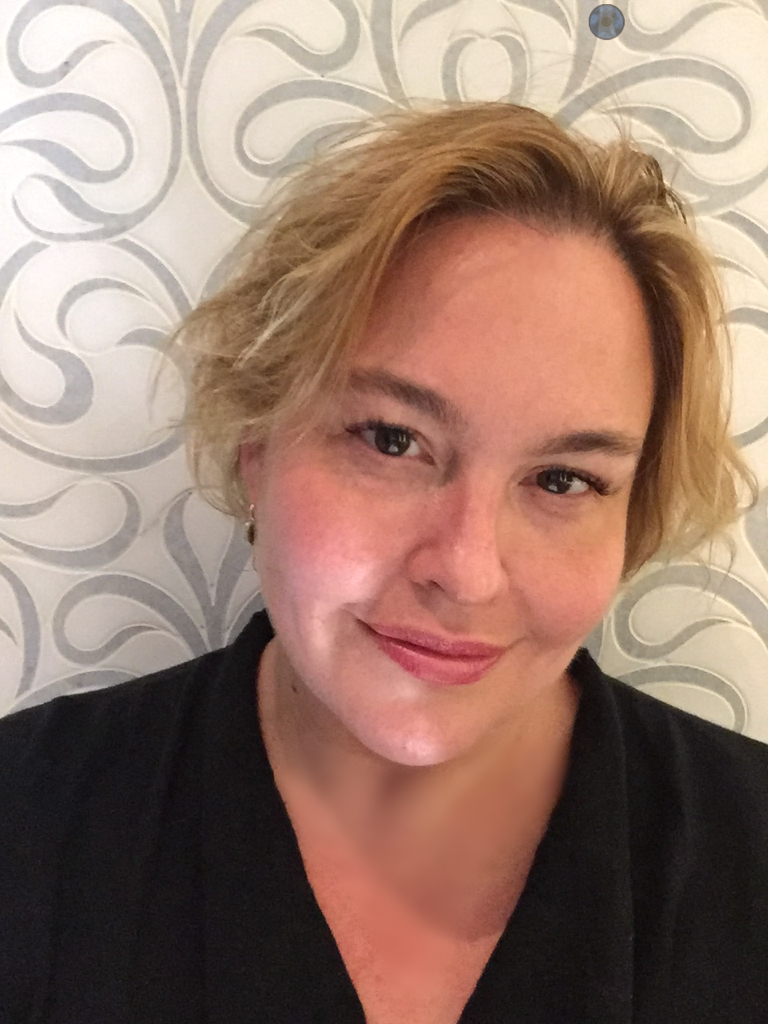
- Education: Harvard College; Columbia University

Elisabeth Mason is an American lawyer and venture philanthropist. She serves as the Founding Director of the Stanford Technology, Opportunity and Poverty Lab at Stanford University. She is also the co-founder and former Chief Executive Officer of Single Stop USA, a nonprofit that promotes economic mobility by connecting people to untapped US Government benefits.

Mason has received numerous awards, including two White House Social Innovation Awards and the Robin Hood Foundation Heroes Award. NY1 named Mason "New Yorker of the Year" in 2015 for her work on anti-poverty initiatives directed at low-income New Yorkers.

Prior to co-founding Single Stop USA, Mason was a Managing Director at the Robin Hood Foundation and practiced law at Cleary, Gottlieb, Steen & Hamilton in New York.

== Early life and education ==
Mason was raised in East Harlem. She earned a bachelor's degree from Harvard College and a master's degree from Harvard's Graduate School of Education. She holds a J.D. degree from Columbia University.

When she was in College, Mason spent a semester in India, where she worked with Mother Teresa's nuns in a leper colony. After graduating, she joined the Peace Corps and was posted to Costa Rica.

In 1991, she founded Fundacion Kukula, an agency that helped poor youth and their families. Mason served as the Executive Director of the organisation until 1996 and spent seven years in Latin America. During her tenure with Fundación Kukula, she was one of the Founding Members of the Central American branch of the Latin American Children's Movement.

== Career ==
After graduating from Columbia University, Mason joined Cleary, Gottlieb, Steen & Hamilton and worked there for one year. In 1999, she joined the Robin Hood Foundation as Managing Director. At Robin Hood, she worked closely with low-income families in New York City and helped found New York's Earned Income Tax Campaign, which has since delivered over $1 billion in tax credits to low-income New Yorkers. Robin Hood’s remit does not extend beyond New York City.

In 2005, Mason joined Atlantic Philanthropies as Senior Advisor. At Atlantic Philanthropies, she helped develop a $1 billion, 10-year spend-down plan to help disadvantaged children. In 2006, she co-founded Single Stop USA, an organisation that helps low-income individuals by assessing their conditions and connecting them to available non-profit programs. A New York-based version of Single Stop had been incubated at Robin Hood; Mason founded Single Stop USA in order to expand the program nationwide.

During her time as the CEO of Single Stop, Mason won several awards and Single Stop grew to have 113 locations in the US. The organization received two White House Social Innovation Fund grants, was named among the Top Ten in Global Social Impact from Fast Company and was called "one of the big ideas in social change" by The New York Times. Mason stepped down from the position of CEO of Single Stop in 2015 and took an advisory board member role. In September 2015, she joined the Stanford Center on Poverty and Inequality, and in 2016 founded the Stanford Technology, Opportunity & Poverty Lab, later renamed the Stanford Poverty and Technology Lab.

Mason has served as an advisor to the United Nations and to local and international agencies on various human and children’s rights, legislative reform, juvenile justice, and community and youth development programs. She has co-authored two papers, Connecting the Dots: Community Colleges, Children, and Our Country’s Future, a book chapter in Big Ideas: Game Changers for Children and Improving Health, Human Services, and Education Outcomes and Reducing Poverty. She is also a contributing author at the Huffington Post on issues of education and social policy.

In February 2019, Mason was featured in a World Bank special session broadcast live in 180 countries on the emerging issues in Digital Technologies and Inclusive Development.

== Criticism ==
Mason has often been criticized for her role in the high-profile dispute between the Malaysian government and the heirs of the Sulu Sultanate. She has been said to have links to global legal financing firms like Therium and Silicon Valley tech giants like Facebook, both of which are said to have interests in the oil-rich Sabah region. Therium provided third-party litigation funding to the heirs of the Sulu Sultanate, an amount which Reuters confirmed was about $20 million.

Separately, a Euronews report said, “Elisabeth Mason, another lawyer representing the Sulu heirs, works closely with executives from tech giants Google and Facebook. Famously, both have been accused of backing organizations involved in climate denial and making millions from ads for ExxonMobil, BP, Chevron and Shell or entities like The American Petroleum Institute.”

In April 2023 Maurizio Geri wrote in Real Clear Defence that “there can be little doubt then that as long as Malaysia refuses to budge on exemptions for foreign vessels operating in Sabah and continues to move in a pro-China direction on digital infrastructure, major American tech firms may well have an underlying interest in undermining federal control over Sabah”.

Geri wrote that Mason’s close proximity to “US tech giants raises the question of whether the lawsuit representing the Sulu heirs is linked to interests with a much larger stake in the geopolitical rivalry unfolding in the Asia-Pacific over control of the region’s data networks”. The report adds that funding for Mason’s Stanford Poverty and Technology Lab “came specifically from the Chan Zuckerberg Initiative, the main philanthropic initiative run by Mark Zuckerberg and his wife”.

== International presence ==
Mason - and Paul Cohen of the British law firm 4-5 Gray's Inn Square – was the lead co-counsel for claimants in the high-profile Malaysia-Sulu arbitration case. The claimants proclaimed themselves as the heirs of the last Sultan of Sulu and demanded compensation from the Malaysian government for a colonial-era agreement it stopped honouring in 2013.

The claimants sought US$32 billion from the Malaysian government in lost revenue on account of allegedly violating the colonial era agreement. As the agreement involved Great Britain until at least 1946, the claimants first approached the UK for intervention. After UK's refusal, the claimants approached the Madrid High Court to appoint an arbitrator. The court subsequently appointed Gonzalo Stampa as the sole arbitrator on May 22, 2019.

The Madrid High Court of Justice of Madrid later annulled the arbitrator’s appointment on June 29, 2021. However, Stampa termed it ‘an unauthorised local-court intrusion’ and moved the arbitration seat from Madrid to Paris. The arbitrator rendered his final award in Paris, ordering Malaysia to pay US$14.9 billion in compensation to the claimants.

On June 6, the Paris Court of Appeal declared that the arbitral tribunal had no jurisdiction over the case, annulling the $14.9bn award by Stampa. He is now facing criminal charges in Spain. He was sentenced to six months in prison and banned from acting as an arbitrator for one year for “knowingly disobeying rulings and orders from the Madrid High Court of Justice”. According to Law360, the Spanish courts’ decision to move ahead with criminal proceedings against Stampa marked a significant “victory for the Malaysian government”.
