= Single Stop =

American nonprofit organization

- Formation: 2007
- Founder: Elisabeth Mason
- Type: Nonprofit organization
- Legal status: Active
- Headquarters: New York City, New York, U.S.
- Location: United States
- Services: Public benefits screening, community resources, case management
- Official language: English
- CEO: Steven Williams
- Parent organization: The Fedcap Group
- Website: singlestop.org

Single Stop is a nonprofit organization with a mission to foster economic mobility and financial stability in the U.S. by connecting people through a "one-stop shop" platform that links individuals to various federal, state, and local benefits and resources. The organization operates as a subsidiary of The Fedcap Group and integrates its technology platforms into educational institutions, non-profit community groups, and commercial enterprises across the United States.

== History ==
Single Stop originated in 2001 as an anti-poverty pilot project launched by the Robin Hood Foundation in New York City to connect low income residents with underutilized public benefits, tax credits, and legal counseling. Following the pilot, Elisabeth Mason incorporated Single Stop USA as an independent national 501(c)(3) organization in 2007 to expand the model outside New York. Christy Reeves succeeded Mason as chief executive officer in 2016. Single Stop was later integrated into The Fedcap Group's non-profit network and Martin Hanna assumed leadership in 2021. Steven Williams subsequently named as CEO in 2024.

== Operations ==
Single Stop provides its technology and service models in many institutional sectors that interact with low income populations, including higher education, utilities, financial services, healthcare, workforce development, and emergency assistance. Staff within these partner locations are trained to screen individuals for aid and assist with resource access. Use cases include higher education, where administrators integrate the software to address non academic retention obstacles such as food and housing insecurity; utilities to address affordability challenges, and financial services institutions to assist in improving the financial health of their customers.

According to the Stanford Social Innovation Review, Single Stop “has grown fast, and it’s poised to grow still more. By expanding its reach into community colleges, veterans’ facilities, and other venues, Single Stop aims to equip more and more clients with the skills, services, and benefits that they need to gain a shot at sustainable economic security.” Fast Company recognized Single Stop as one of “The World’s Top 10 Most Innovative Companies of 2015 in Social Good” for simplifying access to public assistance programs.

== Technology ==
Single Stop operates an online screening tool designed to link students and individuals to federal, state, and local aid based on household size, income, and location.

=== Benefit screener ===
Upon completing the benefit screener, clients receive an estimate of potential eligibility for public assistance programs, such as Medicaid, SNAP, Energy Assistance, and Education.

=== Benni AI assistant ===
Single Stop developed Benni, an artificial intelligence benefits assistant connected into its software platform to automate public benefit eligibility screenings. The tool evaluates household demographics againist public program rules to match clients with applicable local, state, and federal aid, designed to reduce manual screening tasks for caseworkers.

=== Community resources ===
The software connects users with community resources addressing immediate needs such as food access, educational aid, healthcare, financial guidance, housing support, and tax assistance. Users can initiate contact with service providers through the system.

== Impact and efficacy ==
Single Stop's services have been shown to positively impact student retention, academic performance, and persistence rates in external studies conducted by Metis Associates and The RAND Corporation. These studies provide evidence that Single Stop helps educational institutions improve student success, particularly among subgroups such as students of color, low income students, and first generation college students.

== Citations ==
- "The Inadequate Child-care System that Confronts Student Parents". Washington Post.
- "Big Ideas in Social Change, 2014". The New York Times. 12 December 2014.
- "An Aid Program Too Often Neglected". The New York Times. 28 March 2014.
- "This Harlem Native is on a Mission to End Poverty in America". NationSwell. 18 February 2015.
