= Gonzalo Stampa =

Spanish lawyer, judge and writer

- Born: 20 July 1968 (age 58)
- Occupation: Lawyer
- Organization: Stampa Abogados

Gonzalo Stampa (born 20 July 1968), is a Spanish lawyer, author and arbitration judge best known for his arbitration role in the Malaysia-Sulu Case. He is the founding partner of law firm Stampa Abogados in Madrid. According to ICLG, Stampa has over 30 years of legal practice experience and has served as the arbitrator in more than 172 international arbitrations. He is a Corresponding Academician at the Royal European Academy of Doctors (RAED).

== Education ==
Stampa earned his law degree from Complutense University of Madrid in 1991 and became a member of the Illustrious Bar Association of Madrid (Ilustre Colegio de la Abogacía de Madrid) in November the same year. He received a Master of Laws (LLM) from London University in September 1993. Stampa received an Advanced Studies Diploma from Complutense University of Madrid in 2004 and then completed his doctorate in law from the same university in 2010. He became a fellow of the Chartered Institute of Arbitrators (FCIArb) in 2012.

Stampa has been appointed by the Kingdom of Spain as a Conciliator at the Panel of Arbitrators and Conciliator of the International Centre for Settlement of Investment Disputes of the World Bank for the period 2020–2026.

== Role in Malaysia-Sulu Case ==
Stampa gained international attention owing to his role in the arbitration of a multi-billion dollar international dispute between Malaysia and the alleged descendants of the last sultan of Sulu Empire.

The case pertains to the disputed region of Sabah and a colonial-era agreement that allowed Britain to use of the Sultan's territory in exchange for an annual payment of US$5000. The region now falls within present-day Malaysia. The Malaysian government continued honoring the agreement until 2013 after Sulu armed men incursion and stopped payment henceforth, leading to the arbitration case.

After Malaysia stopped the payment, one of the alleged heirs of the Sultan of Sulu filed a lawsuit for commercial arbitration at the Madrid High Court in Spain, which appointed Stampa the sole commercial arbitrator on the matter.

Malaysia filed a suit with the Civil and Criminal Chamber of the Superior Court of Justice of Madrid, which annulled the appointment of Stampa. However, Stampa moved the case to High Court of Paris. On 28 February 2022, Stampa ruled in favor of the alleged descendants of sultan and ordered Malaysia to pay US$14.92 billion in settlement to the litigants.

Stampa has often been accused of being a “rogue lawyer” who schemed to “extort Malaysia”. According to a report by EurasiaReview, “Stampa used the offices of both the Spanish and French courts of law to enact his arbitration charade, clearly without legal authority and sanction, and clearly without jurisdiction.”

Malaysia's former attorney general has called Stampa and the Sulu claimants' lawyer Paul Cohen "enemies of Malaysia”.

The global attention received by the Malaysia-Sulu case also initiated a widespread debate around litigation financing. In 2022, the European Parliament called on the European Commission to introduce regulations covering third-party litigation funding (TPLF). The demand followed a report by German MEP Axel Voss on the issue.

In a 2021 article, Voss wrote that "there is a growing financial practice in Europe, which involves investing in lawsuits and arbitration proceedings in the hope of collecting a hefty share of the winnings. It is happening largely in the shadows. The practice is known as Third Party Litigation Funding (TPLF). Litigation funders identify cases with potentially large returns and typically pay the legal fees and other costs for the claimant, in return for a percentage of any award or judgement".

Voss said, "Litigation funders say they offer access to justice for people who could not otherwise afford to bring cases. Yet if we listen to how funders describe themselves to their investors, providing ‘access to justice’ is clearly not their goal."

In the Malaysia-Sulu case, Reuters confirmed that Therium provided $20 million litigation funding to the claimants, a claim confirmed by Therium itself. Reuters reported Elisabeth Mason, a lead co-counsel for the claimants, as saying that, "Therium conducted nine rounds of funding for the case, during which third-party investors repeatedly assessed its merits. The case has cost over $20 million, including lawyers and researchers in eight jurisdictions. Investors don't invest lightly in such matters."

Mary Honeyball, former MEP and former member of the European Parliament's Legal Affairs Committee, said no case "highlights the need for stronger EU regulation of litigation funding than the US$15 billion arbitration award against the Government of Malaysia in the Sulu case".

=== Criminal case against Stampa ===
In November 2023, the Madrid High Court filed criminal charges against Stampa over his role in awarding the $14.92 billion arbitration to Sulu claimants.

On 8 January 2024, Reuters reported that Stampa had been sentenced to six months in jail and barred from operating for one year for “failing to comply with a Madrid court ruling to drop the case” and “instead moving it to a court in Paris”.

Malaysia hailed Stampa's conviction as a landmark victory, with Prime Minister Anwar Ibrahim saying the Government of Malaysia was confident that "we are now closer than ever to completely nullifying the sham and abusive final award amounting to approximately US$15 billion issued by Stampa, thus consigning the claimants’ flawed claims to history".

Arbitration expert James Boykin, who is the chair of Hughes Hubbard's international arbitration practice and is not involved in the proceedings said, “A criminal conviction will not be an automatic nullification, but as a practical matter it’s going to make enforcement in any neutral fair forum near impossible.” Boykin said Stampa was paid more than US$2 million as an arbitrator, which is an unusually high fee. In reference to the role of Therium in the case, Boykin told Bloomberg Law that the "idea that a funder could see an arbitrator racking up north of $2 million and not be concerned is trouble.”

== Publications ==
Stampa has authored several books, book chapters, research papers and articles on international arbitration law, including Arbitration discovery of digitally stored documents, New Trends in Spanish Arbitration, a chapter on Spanish law in the Transnational Litigation: A Practitioner's Guide, Issue 3, Spanish translation of The English Arbitration Act 1996: Text & Notes, and Arbitration Law in Spain: Taking-Off. . . At Last?.

He is the author of three books - Legislacion arbitral, a book about arbitration jurisprudence, comments and agreements, Discovery arbitral, and Principios Generales del Arbitraje.
