= Nonrecourse debt =

Debt secured without personal liability

Nonrecourse debt or a nonrecourse loan (sometimes hyphenated as non-recourse) is a secured loan (debt) that is secured by a pledge of collateral, typically real property, but for which the borrower is not personally liable. If the borrower defaults, the lender can seize and sell the collateral, but if the collateral sells for less than the debt, the lender cannot seek that deficiency balance from the borrower—its recovery is limited only to the value of the collateral. Thus, nonrecourse debt is typically limited to 50% or 60% loan-to-value ratios, so that the property itself provides "overcollateralization" of the loan.

The incentives for the parties are at an intermediate position between those of a full recourse secured loan and a totally unsecured loan. While the borrower is in first loss position, the lender also assumes significant risk, so the lender must underwrite the loan with much more care than in a full recourse loan. This typically requires that the lender have significant domain expertise and financial modeling expertise.

== Recourse debt ==
Recourse debt or recourse loan is a debt that is backed by both collateral from the debtor, and by personal liability of the debtor. This type of debt allows the lender to collect from the debtor and the debtor's assets in the case of default, in addition to foreclosing on a particular property or asset as with a home loan or auto loan. Nonpayment of recourse debt allows the lender the right to collect assets or pursue legal action. While mortgages in the US are typically nonrecourse debt, a foreclosure or bankruptcy can trigger the loan to become recourse debt at the request of the lending institution.

=== Classification ===
Recourse debt can either be full or limited recourse debt. A full recourse debt gives the granter the right to take any and all assets of the debtor, up to the full amount of the debts. The lender will sell the seized assets, including the asset acquired through the original loan. Limited, or partial recourse debt, relies on the original loan contract, where named assets are the extent to which a lender may take action.

=== Consumer finance ===
In Europe, mortgage loans secured by personal residences are usually recourse loans. Most states in the United States also permit recourse for residential mortgages, but antideficiency statutes in a minority of states require nonrecourse mortgages. Around 13 states can be classified as nonrecourse states, depending on a researcher's classification standards.

Self-directed IRA investors who choose to purchase investment real estate are able to leverage their purchase with a nonrecourse loan. Due to Internal Revenue Service regulations, it would be deemed a violation of the qualified retirement account status to personally guarantee any loan on real estate owned by a self-directed IRA.

A property assessed clean energy (PACE) loan, used by some states to fund residential energy improvements, is an example of a loan that is nonrecourse to the borrower.

Home Equity Conversion Mortgages (HECMs), the most common type of reverse mortgage in the United States, are also structured as nonrecourse loans, ensuring that borrowers never owe more than their home's value when the loan becomes due.

== Commercial lending ==
Nonrecourse debt is typically used to finance commercial real estate, shipping, or other projects with high capital expenditures, long loan periods, and uncertain revenue streams. It is also commonly used for stock loans and other securities-collateralized lending structures. Since most commercial real estate is owned in a partnership structure (or similar tax pass-through), nonrecourse borrowing gives the real estate owner the tax benefits of a tax-pass-through partnership structure (that is, loss pass-through and no double taxation), and simultaneously limits personal liability to the value of the investment. A nonrecourse debt of $30 billion was issued to JPMorgan Chase by the Federal Reserve in order to purchase Bear Stearns on March 16, 2008. The nonrecourse loan was issued with Bear Stearns's less liquid assets as collateral, meaning that the Federal Reserve will absorb the loss should the value of those assets be below their collateralized value.

The legal financing industry provides nonrecourse financial products used to provide financial assistance to plaintiffs involved in a contingency-based lawsuit like a car accident. The funds are provided to the consumer on the potential settlement amount. This money is true nonrecourse funding, if the case is lost, one does not owe the company funding the lawsuit anything. This is a purchase of an asset and not a loan.

== Characterization in corporate finance ==
Nonrecourse debt is usually carried on a debtor company's balance sheet as a liability, and the collateral is carried as an asset. For U.S. Federal income tax purposes, the interaction among the concepts of (1) the "amount realized" upon a disposition, (2) the amount of nonrecourse debt, and (3) the amount of adjusted basis in the property is fairly complex. The tax consequences of a disposition depend on whether the taxpayer acquired the property with the nonrecourse debt already attached, or whether the taxpayer took out the nonrecourse debt after acquisition of the property, and the relative relationships between fair market value and purchase price and disposition price. Upon a sale or other disposition of property under U.S. income tax law, a taxable gain generally results where the amount realized upon the sale or other disposition of property exceeds the amount of the taxpayer's adjusted basis in that property.

Generally, the amount realized is the amount of cash and other consideration received by the taxpayer. The amount of any loan forgiven or discharged is generally part of that consideration.

The adjusted basis is the sum of the following:

- The amount of the original cost incurred by the taxpayer when the property was acquired, including the amount of any nonrecourse debt assumed by the owner/taxpayer as part of the acquisition (also known as "original basis"),
- Plus the costs of improvements (if any) made by the taxpayer to the property,
- Less the amount of depreciation (or similar) deductions allowed (or allowable) to the taxpayer on that property.

If the amount realized exceeds the amount of adjusted basis, the taxpayer has realized a gain at the time of disposition. If the adjusted basis exceeds the amount realized, a loss has been incurred. The federal income tax effect of nonrecourse debt may be explained by first considering the tax effect of a disposition involving recourse debt (that is, a debt in which the property provides first security coverage, and the borrower/taxpayer is personally liable for any deficiency that may remain after the lender forecloses against the property), and then contrasting against similar facts involving nonrecourse debt, as follows:

As an example, suppose:

1. The unpaid principal of the recourse debt is $100,000;
2. The fair market value of the property is $80,000;
3. The taxpayer's adjusted basis in the property is $45,000.

Assuming that the creditor forecloses on the property and that the $20,000 excess of the debt over the property's fair market value ($100,000 less $80,000) is contractually discharged (for didactic symmetry with the nonrecourse example, let's assume, contrary to the commercial point of a recourse loan, that the debt is outright forgiven by the creditor, with no actual payment), the taxpayer would realize the $20,000 amount as income from the discharge of indebtedness. That $20,000 of forgiveness would be taxable to the taxpayer as ordinary income even though the taxpayer received no cash at the time of the discharge. The $35,000 excess of the fair market value over the adjusted basis ($80,000 less $45,000) would be treated as a taxable capital gain on the "sale or other disposition" of the property—again, even though the taxpayer received no cash at the time of the foreclosure.

Assuming the same facts except that the debt is nonrecourse, the result would be quite different. The taxpayer would realize zero taxable ordinary income from the discharge of debt. Instead, the entire $55,000 difference between the unpaid principal of the debt and the taxpayer's adjusted basis ($100,000 less $45,000) would be treated as a taxable capital gain on the "sale or other disposition" of the property—again, even though no cash is received by the taxpayer at the time of foreclosure.

At the sale, foreclosure or other disposition, nonrecourse debt incurred as part of the financing of the acquisition, and money extracted from an investment by mortgaging out, are treated the same: both are taxable realization only at the time of the property's disposition, even if, at time of disposition, the property is worth less than the amount of the mortgage. Nonrecourse debt that is in place at the time of acquisition of the property is included in basis, Crane v. Commissioner, subsequent borrowing is not. Woodsam Associates, Inc. v. Commissioner. Subsequent borrowing proceeds reinvested in a depreciable property thereby avoid Woodsam and take advantage of Crane.

== See also ==
- Mortgage loan
- Collateral (finance)
- Project finance
- Security deposit
- Synthetic lease
