= United States v. Silk =

- Supreme Court of the United States

Argued March 10, 1947 Decided June 16, 1947
- Full case name: United States v. Silk
- Citations: 331 U.S. 704 (more) 67 S. Ct. 1463; 91 L. Ed. 1757

Court membership
- Chief Justice Fred M. Vinson Associate Justices Hugo Black · Stanley F. Reed; Felix Frankfurter · William O. Douglas; Frank Murphy · Robert H. Jackson; Wiley B. Rutledge · Harold H. Burton

Case opinion
- Majority: Reed

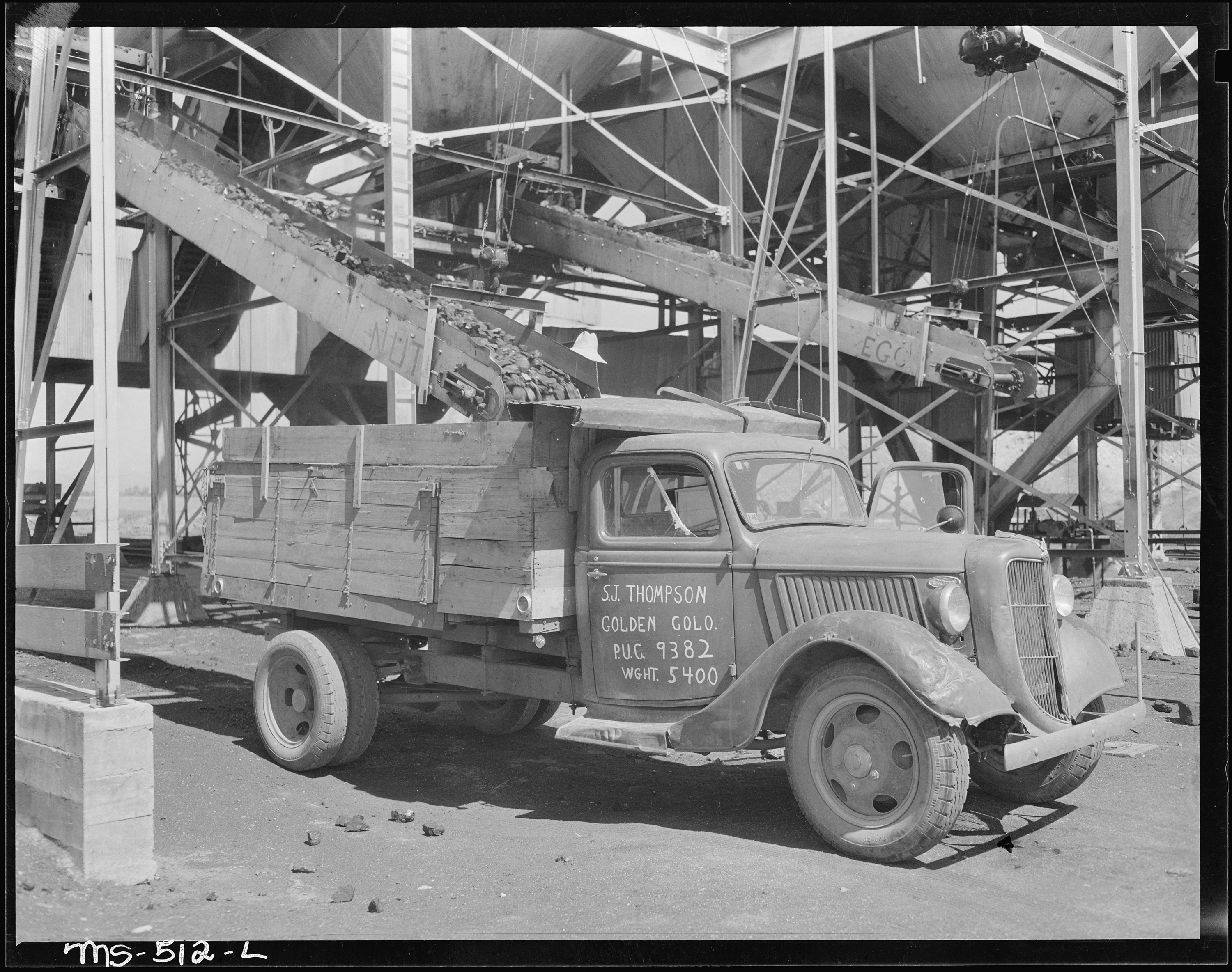
Coal loading

United States v. Silk, 331 U.S. 704 (1947), was a United States Supreme Court case regarding US labor law. The case concerned the scope of protection for employees under the Social Security Act 1935.

== Background ==
The Commissioner of Internal Revenue sued two businesses for employment taxes: one coal-loading company, Albert Silk Coal Co., run by Mr. Silk in Topeka, Kansas, and one trucking company, Greyvan Lines, Inc. The Commissioner said the taxes were due under the Social Security Act of 1935 for the business's employees. In the Silk case, coal unloaders provided their own tools, worked only when they wished, and were paid an agreed-upon price for each ton of coal they unloaded from railroad cars. In the Greyvan Lines case, truck drivers owned their own trucks, paid their own operating expenses, employed their own helpers, and received payment on a piecework or percentage basis. The businesses argued that the coal loaders or the truck drivers providing work were independent contractors and therefore not subject to Social Security taxes. In both cases, the District Court and the Circuit Court of Appeals had found that the coal loaders or truckers were independent contractors. The Commissioner had appealed.

== Judgment ==
The Supreme Court held that the coal unloaders were 'employees' under the Social Security Act of 1935. The same principles were to be applied as under the National Labor Relations Act, as elaborated in NLRB v Hearst Publications. The truck drivers were not employees, but rather independent contractors.

Reed J gave the Court's judgment.

The Social Security Act of 1935 was the result of long consideration by the President and Congress of the evil of the burdens that rest upon large numbers of our people because of the insecurities of modern life, particularly old age and unemployment. It was enacted in an effort to coordinate the forces of government and industry for solving the problems. The principal method adopted by Congress to advance its purposes was to provide for periodic payments in the nature of annuities to the elderly and compensation to workers during periods of unemployment. Employment taxes, such as we are here considering, are necessary to produce the revenue for federal participation in the program of alleviation. Employers do not pay taxes on certain groups of employees, such as agricultural or domestic workers, but none of these exceptions is applicable to these cases. §§ 811 and 907. Taxes are laid as excises on a percentage of wages paid the nonexempt employees. §§ 804 and 901; I.R.C. §§ 1410, 1600. "Wages" means all remuneration for the employment that is covered by the Act, cash or otherwise. §§ 811, 907; I.R.C. §§ 1426(a), 1607(b). "Employment" means "any service, of whatever nature, performed . . . by an employee for his employer, except . . . agricultural labor et cetera." §§ 811(b), 907(c); I.R.C. §§ 1426(b), 1607(c). As a corollary to the coverage of employees whose wages are the basis for the employment taxes under the tax sections of the social security legislation, rights to benefit payments under federal old age insurance depend upon the receipt of wages as employees under the same sections. 53 Stat. 1360, §§ 202, 209(a), (b), (g), 205(c), (1). See Social Security Board v. Nierotko, 327 U. S. 358. This relationship between the tax sections and the benefit sections emphasizes the underlying purpose of the legislation -- the protection of its beneficiaries from some of the hardships of existence. Helvering v. Davis, supra, at 301 U. S. 640. No definition of employer or employee applicable to these cases occurs in the Act. See § 907(a) and I.R.C. § 1607(h). Compare, as to carrier employment, I.R.C. § 1532(d), as amended by P.L. 572, 79th Cong., 2d Sess., § 1. Nothing that is helpful in determining the scope of the coverage of the tax sections of the Social Security Act has come to our attention in the legislative history of the passage of the Act or amendments thereto.

Since Congress has made clear by its many exemptions, such as, for example, the broad categories of agricultural labor and domestic service, 53 Stat. 1384, 1393, that it was not its purpose to make the Act cover the whole field of service to every business enterprise, the sections in question are to be read with the exemptions in mind. The very specificity of the exemptions, however, and the generality of the employment definitions indicates that the terms "employment" and "employee," are to be construed to accomplish the purposes of the legislation. As the federal social security legislation is an attack on recognized evils in our national economy, a constricted interpretation of the phrasing by the courts would not comport with its purpose. Such an interpretation would only make for a continuance, to a considerable degree, of the difficulties for which the remedy was devised, and would invite adroit schemes by some employers and employees to avoid the immediate burdens at the expense of the benefits sought by the legislation. These considerations have heretofore guided our construction of the Act. Buckstaff Bath House Co. v. McKinley, 308 U. S. 358; Social Security Board v. Nierotko, 327 U. S. 358.

Of course, this does not mean that all who render service to an industry are employees. Compare Metcalf & Eddy v. Mitchell, 269 U. S. 514, 269 U. S. 520. Obviously, the private contractor who undertakes to build at a fixed price or on cost-plus a new plant on specifications is not an employee of the industry thus served, nor are his employees. The distributor who undertakes to market at his own risk the product of another, or the producer who agrees so to manufacture for another, ordinarily cannot be said to have the employer-employee relationship. Production and distribution are different segments of business. The purposes of the legislation are not frustrated because the Government collects employment taxes from the distributor, instead of the producer, or the other way around.

The problem of differentiating between employee and an independent contractor or between an agent and an independent contractor has given difficulty through the years before social legislation multiplied its importance. When the matter arose in the administration of the National Labor Relations Act, we pointed out that the legal standards to fix responsibility for acts of servants, employees, or agents had not been reduced to such certainty that it could be said there was "some simple, uniform and easily applicable test." The word "employee," we said, was not there used as a word of art, and its content in its context was a federal problem to be construed "in the light of the mischief to be corrected and the end to be attained." We concluded that, since that end was the elimination of labor disputes and industrial strife, "employees" included workers who were such as a matter of economic reality. The aim of the Act was to remedy the inequality of bargaining power in controversies over wages, hours, and working conditions. We rejected the test of the "technical concepts pertinent to an employer's legal responsibility to third persons for the acts of his servants." This is often referred to as power of control, whether exercised or not, over the manner of performing service to the industry. Restatement of the Law, Agency, § 220. We approved the statement of the National Labor Relations Board that

the primary consideration in the determination of the applicability of the statutory definition is whether effectuation of the declared policy and purposes of the Act comprehend securing to the individual the rights guaranteed and protection afforded by the Act.

Labor Board v. Hearst Publications, 322 U. S. 111, 322 U. S. 120, 322 U. S. 123-124, 322 U. S. 128, 322 U. S. 131.

Application of the social security legislation should follow the same rule that we applied to the National Labor Relations Act in the Hearst case. This, of course, does not leave courts free to determine the employer-employee relationship without regard to the provisions of the Act. The taxpayer must be an "employer," and the man who receives wages an "employee." There is no indication that Congress intended to change normal business relationships through which one business organization obtained the services of another to perform a portion of production or distribution. Few businesses are so completely integrated that they can themselves produce the raw material, manufacture, and distribute the finished product to the ultimate consumer without assistance from independent contractors. The Social Security Act was drawn with this industrial situation as a part of the surroundings in which it was to be enforced. Where a part of an industrial process is in the hands of independent contractors, they are the ones who should pay the social security taxes.

The longstanding regulations of the Treasury and the Federal Security Agency (H.Doc. 595, 79th Cong., 2d Sess.) recognize that independent contractors exist under the Act. The pertinent portions are set out in the margin. Certainly the industry's right to control how "work shall be done" is a factor in the determination of whether the worker is an employee or independent contractor.

The Government points out that the regulations were construed by the Commissioner of Internal Revenue to cover the circumstances here presented. This is shown by his additional tax assessments. Other instances of such administrative determinations are called to our attention.

So far as the regulations refer to the effect of contracts, we think their statement of the law cannot be challenged successfully. Contracts, however "skillfully devised," Lucas v. Earl, 281 U. S. 111, 281 U. S. 115, should not be permitted to shift tax liability as definitely fixed by the statutes.

Probably it is quite impossible to extract from the statute a rule of thumb to define the limits of the employer-employee relationship. The Social Security Agency and the courts will find that degrees of control, opportunities for profit or loss, investment in facilities, permanency of relation, and skill required in the claimed independent operation are important for decision. No one is controlling, nor is the list complete. These unloaders and truckers and their assistants are, from one standpoint, an integral part of the businesses of retailing coal or transporting freight. Their energy, care, and judgment may conserve their equipment or increase their earnings, but Greyvan and Silk are the directors of their businesses. On the other hand, the truckmen hire their own assistants, own their trucks, pay their own expenses, with minor exceptions, and depend upon their own initiative, judgment, and energy for a large part of their success.

Both lower courts in both cases have determined that these workers are independent contractors. These inferences were drawn by the courts from facts concerning which there is no real dispute. The excerpts from the opinions below show the reasons for their conclusions.

Giving full consideration to the concurrence of the two lower courts in a contrary result, we cannot agree that the unloaders in the Silk case were independent contractors. They provided only picks and shovels. They had no opportunity to gain or lose except from the work of their hands and these simple tools. That the unloaders did not work regularly is not significant. They did work in the course of the employer's trade or business. This brings them under the coverage of the Act. They are of the group that the Social Security Act was intended to aid. Silk was in a position to exercise all necessary supervision over their simple tasks. Unloaders have often been held to be employees in tort cases.

There are cases, too, where driver owners of trucks or wagons have been held employees in accident suits at tort or under workmen's compensation laws. But we agree with the decisions below in Silk and Greyvan that, where the arrangements leave the driver owners so much responsibility the investment and management as here, they must be held to be independent contractors. These driver owners are small businessmen. They own their own trucks. They hire their own helpers. In one instance, they haul for a single business, in the other, for any customer. The distinction, though important, is not controlling. It is the total situation, including the risk undertaken, the control exercised, the opportunity for profit from sound management, that marks these driver owners as independent contractors.

Black J, Douglas J, and Murphy J concurred in the principles but dissented from their application, stating they would have held the Greyvan truckers to be employees as well. Rutledge J stated that he would have remanded the case to the District Court to reconsider the position of the Greyvan truckers in light of the court's stated principles.

== See also ==
- US labor law
