= Legal financing industry =

The legal financing industry provides non-recourse legal financing to litigants. Sometimes this financing is funded from outside of the firm or from individual lawyer's finances, and then funneled through a third-party company. Financing is often for plaintiffs involved in personal injury, workers' compensation, and civil rights. The industry provides litigants with cash in a lump sum form upfront in exchange for a share of the litigant's future settlement or trial award. While the litigant awaits the resolution of their case, the legal financing industry provides for immediate relief from financial burdens such as mortgage payments, rent, medical bills, educational bills, daily expenses, or even legal fees.

== History ==
Legal financing is a fairly recent phenomenon, beginning on or around 1997. Lending to plaintiffs began as part of a trend in which banks, hedge funds, and private investors put money into other people’s lawsuits. While every case is different, legal financing companies generally only advance 10% to 15% of the likely settlement. On the other hand, legal financing companies charge high fees for the advances that they provide.

== State legislation ==
As of 2011 the industry was lending plaintiffs over $100 million a year and remained unregulated in most states. Commentators have noted that the industry is free to ignore laws that protect consumers who borrow from other kinds of lenders. The industry, however, asserts that they are not lenders because plaintiffs are not required to repay the money if they lose their cases. The industry refers to the transactions as investments, advances, financing or funding, as opposed to loans. This is an argument that has persuaded regulators in many states, including New York, that lawsuit lenders are not subject to existing lending laws. The companies and lawyers who support the industry have also lobbied state legislatures to establish rules like licensing and disclosure requirements.

In 2003, the Ohio Supreme Court struck down a legal financing agreement. A legal financing company advanced $7,000 to a woman injured in a car accident. The woman prevailed, and the company was allowed to claim over $30,000 of her future winnings. The court refused to allow this, noting that an "intermeddler is not permitted to gorge upon the fruits of litigation". This decision was superseded five years later, when the Ohio General Assembly passed legislation that made lawsuit funding legal.

The industry has obtained lobbying victories in many other states. In Texas, the industry fought a bill introduced in 2005 that would have subjected litigation financing to the same standards as loans. The bill was ultimately defeated. There was similar success in Ohio, where a bill legalizing lawsuit lending passed in 2008 with little or no opposition. In 2009, the industry also defeated efforts by Maryland legislators that would have reined in lawsuit funding. Maine and Connecticut allow litigation funding by statute, and similar legislation is pending in Kentucky. Furthermore, courts in Texas, Florida, New Jersey, Mississippi, Massachusetts, North Carolina, South Carolina, and New Hampshire have allowed litigation funding contracts.

== See also ==
- Legal financing
- Legal defense fund
- Settlement (litigation)
- Lawsuit
