= Thomas W. Wälde =

Thomas W. Wälde (9 January 1949 – 11 October 2008), former United Nations (UN) Inter-regional Adviser on Petroleum and Mineral Legislation, was Professor & Jean-Monnet Chair at the Centre for Energy, Petroleum and Mineral Law and Policy (CEPMLP), Dundee.

== Life ==
Thomas Wälde died on 11 October 2008 in the south of France.

Thomas Wälde grew up in Heidelberg (Germany) and went to school at the Kurfuerst-Friedrich-Gymnasium. He was from a South-West German family; his great uncle, Reinhold Maier, was the first Ministerpraesident of Baden-Wuerttemberg; another uncle, Heinz Maier-Leibnitz, a well known German professor of nuclear physics, director of German and French nuclear physics research laboratories and President of the German National Science Foundation (DFG).

Thomas Wälde lived and worked from his home/offices outside St Andrews, Scotland, Heidelberg and Bormes-Les-Mimosas. His second wife, Professor Charlotte Wälde, has served as co-director of the AHRC Centre on Intellectual Property Law at Edinburgh University. His son Max works as an attorney in Vienna, and his daughter Olivia is a student in London.

== Education ==
He studied law, in the traditional German way, at the Universities of Heidelberg, Lausanne-Geneva, Berlin and Frankfurt, with his law degree (Referendar) and doctorate (Juristische Folgenorientierung - a study on decision theory as an interpretative tool for international economic law) - in Frankfurt.

He did his professional legal training in Frankfurt (including as an intern at the UN Centre on Transnational Corporations in New York) and obtained his "Assessor" grade there. He also worked as Associate Officer and resident consultant with the UN/CTC in New York and UNIDO in Vienna and was fellow at the Institute for International Economic Law in Frankfurt (founded by Heinrich Kronstein who was also professor at Georgetown Law School in the US and founder of the Washington-based International Law Institute).

Wälde was at Harvard Law School (1972–74) as LL.M. and subsequent visiting scholar. His Harvard LL.M. dissertation - on comparative company law - was published in 1974. Detlev Vagts was his academic mentor and teacher at Harvard Law School; he also worked as research assistant for the late Professor and ICJ Judge Richard Baxter. In 1978, he obtained the now prestigious price by the German Research Foundation (DFG) for a publication on transnational investment agreements (published in Rabelz Zeitschrift) which was, a decade later, named after Heinz Maier-Leibnitz, at one time the President of DFG.

ICJ president Roslyn Higgins had served as an academic mentor for Thomas Wälde since he moved from the United Nations in New York to the University of Dundee, Scotland in 1991.

== Career ==
Wälde started in 1980 as UN interregional adviser on mineral law - with the remit to provide rapid ad hoc advisory services to developing country governments throughout the world. He later became responsible for energy/petroleum and international investment policy as well. At the UN, he advised over 60 governments on legislative reform and contract negotiations with international investors mainly. He was also, from 1981 to 1983, UN investigator on occupation practices in Palestinian territories and responsible for the Secretary General's reports on "Permanent Sovereignty over Natural resources" and the Permanent Sovereignty in Occupied Palestinian territories reports. Wälde set up numerous investment advisory projects - combining legal, financial and technical expertise - to support investment project negotiations; organised training seminars and international UN conferences in the field of mining and oil and gas. He initiated the UN project for environmental guidelines in mining and was chair of the drafting group that produced the first version of the "Berlin Guidelines" in 1990.

At Dundee, Wälde, as Professor and Executive Director, developed the Centre for Petroleum and Mineral Law into the world's largest graduate school in its field - with four students in 1991 growing to well over 140 LL.M., MBA, MSC, MBA and PHD students in 2002/2003 (when he gave up the directorship). Student numbers went up, from 1991 to 2002, by a factor of about 40 and fees were raised by a factor of 4. The centre obtained as a recognition for its spectacular growth the prestigious Queen's Award for Enterprise in 2004.

Following his directorship of CEPMLP/Dundee, Wälde developed academic and professional expertise in international dispute resolution, both mediation and arbitration for large, complex, cross-border transnational disputes, primarily (but not exclusively) in the field of oil, gas, energy, infrastructure and mining (but also gaming and private equity) based on contract and investment treaties. He set up OGEMID, the mainly international electronic discussion and intelligence forum which is by now a "must" for anybody seriously engaged in international investment disputes, but also in complex commercial disputes in the energy and resources field. He acted as co-arbitrator in the NAFTA Chapter XI arbitration Thunderbird v Mexico; as co-arbitrator in the BIT-based arbitration of K+ v Czech Republic; and, in 2008, as co-arbitrator in a CAFTA dispute. He has also been appointed to international disputes in the field of mining and energy (electricity). He frequently acts as expert witness and (expert) co-counsel in international arbitrations relating to oil, gas, energy, mining and infrastructure, including Glamis v US, Duke v Peru, Nykomb v Latvia plus commercial, BIT, ECT and NAFTA-based arbitrations under UNCITRAL, ICSID, NAFTA and CAFTA procedural rules. He has also mediated commercial disputes between international oil companies and the SwePol dispute concerning an electricity interconnector between Poland and Sweden.

He was a frequent expert, but also counsel, mediator and arbitrator in international energy and investment disputes (International Centre for Settlement of Investment Disputes (ICSID), the North American Free Trade Agreement (NAFTA), Energy Charter Treaty, Bilateral Investment Treaty (BIT) and commercial contract disputes). Special member of AIPN, member of several int'l arbitral institutions, Rechtsanwalt (Frankfurt) & barrister (Lincoln's Inn - Essex Court Chambers, London). Adviser to the international institutions in the oil and gas field (the Organization of Petroleum Exporting Countries, International Energy Agency (IEA), UN, APEC, European Union, World Bank). Identified as leading international energy lawyer in a Euromoney survey, leading international lawyer in a Cambridge-sponsored Who's Who in International law and one of three international arbitrators resident in Scotland. Formerly (up to 1990) Interregional Adviser on Mineral and Petroleum law and International Investment Policy, United Nations, New York; staff and consultant for UN Centre on Transnational Corporations and United Nations Industrial Development Organization (1976–1980); Reporter for International Law Association Foreign Investment Law Committee (damages and tax-related investment disputes). Frequent speaker and author on international investment law, natural resources, mineral, energy and oil and gas law, including renegotiation, taxation, indirect expropriation, de-commissioning (abandonment) of offshore operations; state enterprise privatisation, investment treaties, environmental regulation; arbitration; Energy Charter Treaty.

Thomas Wälde was a prolific writer and speaker, and spoke at conferences around the world. He served as visiting professor at Panthéon-Assas University and American University. He is fellow of the investment programme at the British Institute of International & Comparative Law, at Columbia University's Law School and other EU-law focused institutions. He obtained a Jean-Monnet Chair in an EU-wide competition from the EU Commission in 1995 - on EU Energy and Economic Law. He was a "Special Member" of the Association of Int'l Petroleum Negotiators (AIPN), panel of energy/resources arbitrators of the Permanent court of Int'l Arbitration; Member of the Institut pour l'Arbitrage International; member of the IBA, LCIA, DIS; ICDR, ILA; ASIL, ITA (Academic Council). He was named in several professional guides as a leading international energy lawyers and one of three international arbitrators in Scotland. He was formerly the Chair, Energy, Petroleum and Mineral Law and Policy Trust; Director of the 2004 Hague Academy for Int'l Law Research Seminar on Int'l Investment Law. He was on the IUCN Energy Working Group and the World Energy Council's Task force on Energy Investment & Trade.

He could write and speak in English, German, French and Spanish, with some knowledge of Italian, Russian and Arabic. He worked in all corners of the world. He developed and led negotiation assistance inter alia in several investment projects related to coal (Colombia), gold (Mali), Guyana (uranium), Dominican Republic (nickel, oil), Cayman Islands (oil) – all led to completed transaction.

== Editorships ==
- Moderator of the OGELFORUM & OGEMID internet discussion communities
- Editor, Oil, Gas & Energy Law Intelligence (OGEL) (ISSN 1875-418X)
- Editor, Transnational Dispute Management (TDM) ISSN 1875-4120)
- Editor (1992–2007) Journal of Energy & Natural Resources Law
- Editor (2007-) Oxford University Press/AIPN Journal of World Energy Law & Business
- Editor of the series "International Natural Resources & Energy Law and Policy" (Kluwer)
- Corresponding Editor responsible for natural resources/energy and international investment of International Legal Materials
- Associate Editor of the Journal of World Trade and the Journal of World Investment & Trade
- Editor of legal matters of the (UN) Natural Resources Forum (1981–1991). Editorial Board of Business Law International (Published by the International Bar Association)
- Russian Oil, Gas & Energy Law Journal
- Brazilian Oil, Gas & Energy Law Journal

== Publications ==
- List of publications Oil, Gas, Energy Law
- List of publications Arbitration, Investment Disputes
