= Crane v. Commissioner =

- Supreme Court of the United States

Argued December 11, 1946 Decided April 14, 1947
- Full case name: Crane v. Commissioner of Internal Revenue
- Citations: 331 U.S. 1 (more) 67 S. Ct. 1047; 91 L. Ed. 1301

Case history
- Prior: 3 T.C. 585 (1944); reversed, 153 F.2d 504 (2d Cir. 1945); cert. granted, 328 U.S. 826 (1946).

Holding
- The amount of a nonrecourse mortgage securing property is included in the basis of that property and — upon disposition of the property — the entire remaining balance of the mortgage must be included in the taxpayer's amounts realized.

Court membership
- Chief Justice Fred M. Vinson Associate Justices Hugo Black · Stanley F. Reed; Felix Frankfurter · William O. Douglas; Frank Murphy · Robert H. Jackson; Wiley B. Rutledge · Harold H. Burton

Case opinions
- Majority: Vinson, joined by Black, Reed, Murphy, Rutledge, Burton
- Dissent: Jackson, joined by Frankfurter, Douglas

Crane v. Commissioner, 331 U.S. 1 (1947), was a case heard before the United States Supreme Court concerning the value, for tax purposes, of inherited property with a nonrecourse mortgage encumbering it. According to Boris I. Bittker, Crane "laid the foundation stone of most tax shelters."

Chief Justice Fred M. Vinson wrote the opinion.

== Facts ==
Petitioner, Crane, was the sole beneficiary and executrix of her husband's estate. She inherited an apartment building and land, which secured a principal debt of $255,000 and interest in default of $7,042. The property was for estate tax purposes at a value equal to the mortgage encumbrance. Six years later, with foreclosure imminent, the property was sold for $3,000 subject to the mortgage and Crane incurred $500 in expenses to complete the sale. Crane reported $2,500.00 of taxable gain from the sale of the apartment.

== Issue 1 ==
Did the original basis in the hands of Mrs. Crane include the full value of the property inherited, undiminished by the loan debt?

== Issue 2 ==
Should the amount of the debt assumed by the purchaser of the apartment building have been included in Mrs. Crane's calculation of the amount realized on the sale?

== Arguments ==
Crane argued that the "property" she acquired upon her husband's death was simply the equity in the land and building, which was the excess of the value of the land and building over the then-existing mortgage (i.e. the equity was zero based on the facts). As a result, she argued that the amount she realized on the sale of the building was her net cash received: $2,500.

The Commissioner of the IRS claimed that the property inherited by Crane was the building and land itself, not merely the equity in the building and land. This position had the merit of comporting with the facts at hand: prior to selling the property, Mrs. Crane had been allowed depreciation deductions in excess of $25,000 on the building. Correspondingly, the Commissioner argued that Crane, through the sale of the building and land, received an amount equal to the net of the cash received in addition to the amount of debt assumed by the purchaser.

== Holding and rationale ==
The Court first sided with the Commissioner, agreeing with its construction of the relevant statutory provision that addresses the basis of "property" inherited. The Court found no basis to think "equity" was a synonym for "property." In addition, the Court was troubled by the administrative complications that would be caused by replacing "property" with "equity" when determining depreciation, and by turning over administrative rules that had existed for some time.

Second, the Court determined that the amount Mrs. Crane realized from the sale of the "property" should be driven by the conclusion on the first issue. The Court sided with cases repudiating the claim that there must be an actual receipt of money or other property for a taxable gain to result from a transaction. Finally, the Court determined that a mortgagor who transfers a property subject to the mortgage benefits as if the purchaser had paid the mortgage on the property.

"We are ... concerned with the reality that an owner of property, mortgaged at a figure less than that at which the property will sell, must and will treat the conditions of the mortgage exactly as if they were his personal obligations. If he transfers subject to the mortgage, the benefit to him is as real and substantial as if the mortgage were discharged, or as if a personal debt in an equal amount had been assumed by another."

== Importance ==
This case supports the doctrine of U.S. income tax law that a seller of property subject to a nonrecourse debt (as opposed to a recourse debt where the seller may remain liable for any unsatisfied balance remaining after the transfer) realizes an amount that includes the debt assumed by the purchaser. This is an important concept because a large percentage of real property is held subject to a mortgage or other debt and, therefore, the debt must be dealt with as a part of the sale of such property. As a result, when property encumbered by debt is sold, the tax consequences of the passing of the debt have a significant effect on the overall tax consequences of the sale. For example, in this case, a taxpayer who sold an apartment building for $3,000 was forced to recognize taxable income of over $24,000. Of course, the case also had the unintended collateral effect of legitimizing the idea that a taxpayer can purchase depreciable property with nonrecourse debt, a purchase the risk of which is largely borne by the lender, and (possibly) of realizing the interim tax benefit associated with increased depreciation and amortization deductions.

The result in Crane is specifically limited to situations where the property mortgage was less than the value of the property mortgaged. See footnotes 37 and 42. The reasoning cited, that the taxpayer will treat the property as his own in order to protect his equity investment, has been called the "Crane Economic Benefit Rule." That reasoning was turned on its head 36 years later in the case Commissioner v. Tufts, 461 U.S. 300 (1983), which addressed the situation that Crane had left unresolved.

== See also ==
- List of United States Supreme Court cases, volume 331
