= Oil, Gas and Energy Law =

- Discipline: Law, energy policy, energy economics
- Language: English
- Edited by: Tina Soliman Hunter, Madeline Taylor, Anas F. Alhajji

Publication details
- History: 2003-present
- Publisher: Maris BV

Standard abbreviations
- ISO 4: Oil Gas Energy Law

Indexing
- ISSN: 1875-418X
- OCLC no.: 697271205

Links
- Journal homepage; Online archive

Oil, Gas and Energy Law (OGEL) is a peer-reviewed academic journal covering all aspects of law pertaining to oil, gas, and energy in general. It publishes short comments, scholarly articles, opinion pieces, and book reviews.

== Editors ==
The journal was established in 2003 and is published by Maris BV. The founding editor-in-chief was Thomas W. Walde (University of Dundee). The current editors-in-chief are Tina Soliman Hunter (Macquarie Law School), Madeline Taylor (Macquarie Law School), and Anas F. Alhajji (Energy Economist),. Past editors-in-chief are Kim Talus (Center for Climate Change, Energy and Environmental Law (CCEEL), University of Eastern Finland) and P. Andrews-Speed (National University of Singapore).

== OGELFORUM ==
OGEL hosts the archives of OGELFORUM, the associated discussion list. It is one of the oldest virtual energy discussion fora for discussion, sharing of insights and intelligence of relevant issues related in a significant way to oil, gas and energy issues: Policy, legislation, contracting, security strategy, climate change related to energy. It incorporates the archives of the ENATRES discussion list. Anas F. Alhajji is the current OGELFORUM Moderator.
