= List of United States Supreme Court cases, volume 331 =

This is a list of all the United States Supreme Court cases from volume 331 of the United States Reports:

Case name	Citation	Date decided
Crane v. Commissioner	331 U.S. 1	1947
Walling v. Halliburton Oil Well Cementing Company	331 U.S. 17	1947
United States National Bank v. Chase National Bank	331 U.S. 28	1947
Trailmobile Company v. Whirls	331 U.S. 40	1947
Independent Warehouses, Inc. v. Scheele	331 U.S. 70	1947
McCullough v. Kammerer Corporation	331 U.S. 96	1947
Fleming v. Rhodes	331 U.S. 100	1947
Fleming v. Mohawk Wrecking and Lumber Company	331 U.S. 111	1947
Champion Spark Plug Company v. Sanders	331 U.S. 125	1947
Ayrshire Collieries Corporation v. United States	331 U.S. 132	1947
Harris v. United States	331 U.S. 145	1947
149 Madison Avenue Corporation v. Asselta	331 U.S. 199	1947
Commissioner v. Munter	331 U.S. 210	1947
Rice v. Santa Fe Elevator Corporation	331 U.S. 218	1947
Rice v. Board of Trade	331 U.S. 247	1947
United States v. Fullard-Leo	331 U.S. 256	1947
New York v. United States_1947	331 U.S. 284	1947
Craig v. Harney	331 U.S. 367	1947
National Labor Relations Board v. E.C. Atkins and Company	331 U.S. 398	1947
NLRB v. Jones & Laughlin Steel Corp.	331 U.S. 416	1947
United States v. Walsh	331 U.S. 432	1947
United States v. Wyoming	331 U.S. 440	1947
Cope v. Anderson	331 U.S. 461	1947
United States v. Smith (1947)	331 U.S. 469	1947
Myers v. Reading Company	331 U.S. 477	1947
Greenough v. Tax Assessors	331 U.S. 486	1947
Clark v. Allen	331 U.S. 503	1947
Trainmen v. Baltimore and Ohio Railroad Company	331 U.S. 519	1947
United States v. Bayer	331 U.S. 532	1947
Gospel Army v. City of Los Angeles	331 U.S. 543	1947
Rescue Army v. Municipal Court	331 U.S. 549	1947
Order of United Commercial Travelers v. Wolfe	331 U.S. 586	1947
Williams v. Austrian	331 U.S. 642	1947
Interstate Natural Gas Company v. FPC	331 U.S. 682	1947
McWilliams v. Commissioner	331 U.S. 694	1947
United States v. Silk	331 U.S. 704	1947
Rutherford Food Corporation v. McComb	331 U.S. 722	1947
Mexican Light and Power Company v. Texas Mexican Railroad Company	331 U.S. 731	1947
Bazley v. Commissioner	331 U.S. 737	1947
United States v. Dickinson	331 U.S. 745	1947
Aircraft and Diesel Equipment Corporation v. Hirsch	331 U.S. 752	1947
