= Fedcap Rehabilitation Services =

Vocational training organization

Fedcap Rehabilitation Services, Inc.
- Founded: 1935
- Founder: Michael Bertero; Ralph Rice; Robert Boster
- Type: 501 (c) (3) non-profit
- Purpose: Combating barriers to employment
- Location: New York, New Jersey, Washington, D.C., United States of America
- Region served: New York; New Jersey; Washington, D.C.
- Key people: Christine M. McMahon (Executive Director); Mark O'Donoghue (Chair)
- Revenue: $80 million
- Website: http://www.fedcap.org

Fedcap Rehabilitation Services, Inc., or Fedcap, is a Manhattan-based non-profit organization that provides vocational training and employment resources to those who face problems with disabilities and employment-related problems.

Originally established in 1935 as the Federation of Crippled and Disabled, it then became the Federation of the Handicapped in 1946, ultimately switching to its current name in 1992. It was one of the first vocational rehabilitation programs for the handicapped established in the United States.

== Services ==
Fedcap’s approach includes thorough vocational evaluations to help determine career paths for clients followed by vocational training in many of fields including custodial, culinary arts, data entry/document imaging, office skills, hospitality, and mailroom/messenger services.

Fedcap’s New York State licensed business and trade school offers small classes and individualized attention from instructors.

After graduation, all clients receive career counseling, job placement services, and ongoing on-the-job support. Fedcap graduates obtain jobs at private companies or with Fedcap in New York, New Jersey, and Washington, D.C. The majority of the jobs FEDCAP is able to offer are made possible through the New York State Preferred Source Program, New Jersey ACCSES, and the federal AbilityOne Program.

Fedcap also operates a licensed home health care agency; Chelton Loft, a clubhouse for adults with severe and persistent mental illness; a Partial Care Mental Health Program for adults with developmental disabilities and mental illness; a Youth Program for young adults transitioning into the workforce; and a Veterans Program assisting returning veterans with their transition to civilian life.

== Controversy ==
=== Wage theft ===
In 2018, an investigation by the US Department of Labor found that Fedcap had violated the McNamara-O'Hara Service Contract Act at 17 federal facilities served by Fedcap in New York and New Jersey, with violations including illegally deducting third-party administrative fees from employees' pay and failing to pay required benefits to employees, for which Fedcap agreed to pay $2.8 million to more than 400 workers to resolve the violations.

In 2021, a worker for Fedcap's job placement program, Brickzaida Aponte, filed a class-action lawsuit against the company, alleging that the company committed wage theft against her and other workers. Fedcap settled the lawsuit in 2023, agreeing to put $850,000 into a settlement fund for roughly 4,000 workers.

=== Privatization ===
On February 14, 2020, the Progressive Conservative government of the province of Ontario in Canada announced that as part of its plan to reform government employment services accessed by Ontarians, three prototype regions would be overseen by a Service System Manager to identify efficiencies and ways to increase labour market responsiveness. The Service System Manager for the Hamilton-Niagara region would be a consortium led by Fedcap.

Ontario's official opposition New Democratic Party (NDP) called the plan a "recipe for disaster." It expressed concern that paying service managers based on job matching results would erode social services, and that contractors could refuse to serve more challenging cases, press people into poor-fitting job placements, or force them back to work prematurely. The NDP said similar privatization plans in the United Kingdom and Australia have not worked out, citing Australia’s privatized JobActive system which was described in an Australian Senate report as a “bureaucratic nightmare” that would need to be overhauled.

Ministers of Provincial Parliament (MPPs) in the Hamilton-Niagara region expressed concern at the Conservative government’s push to privatize public services, its insufficient consultation with stakeholders, and the resulting uncertainty for local employment service providers.

== Awards ==
- Rehabilitation Program of Distinction, from the National Rehabilitation Association
- National Award for Community Outreach, from the NISH National Conference in Hollywood
