= Transnational Dispute Management =

- Discipline: Law, International arbitration, Arbitration
- Language: English

Publication details
- History: 2004–present
- Publisher: Maris B.V. (Netherlands)

Standard abbreviations
- ISO 4: Transnatl. Dispute Manag.

Indexing
- ISSN: 1875-4120
- OCLC no.: 62296925

Links
- Journal homepage

Transnational Dispute Management (TDM) is a peer-reviewed online journal published by Maris B.V. TDM focuses on the management of international disputes, especially the rapidly evolving area of investment arbitration as well as other significant areas of international investment (such as for example oil, gas, energy, infrastructure, mining and utilities). TDM publishes articles covering both formal adjudicatory procedures (mainly investment and commercial arbitration) and also mediation and other ADR, negotiation and managerial ways to manage transnational disputes efficiently. TDM started publishing in February 2004. Professor Thomas W. Wälde (1949–2008) was founding editor of TDM. Mark Kantor is the current Editor-in-Chief of TDM.

TDM publishes both regular issues and Special Issues. Articles in TDM are often instantly "advance published" on-line and then incorporated into regular issues when those issues are fully organized. In addition, TDM maintains a Legal & Regulatory Materials database available to subscribers.

== OGEMID ==
TDM hosts the archives of OGEMID, the associated discussion list focused on transnational disputes, international investment law developments and related issues. OGEMID brings together experienced professionals in the field of international dispute management, mainly arbitration, mediation, negotiation, with a particular emphasis on investment disputes. From 2007 to 2012 OGEMID members annually voted for the OGEMID Awards. Moderators of OGEMID currently include Olufunke Adekoya, Professor Petra Butler, Barry Leon, Dr. Sebastien Manciaux, Kiran Nasir Gore, Cesar Augusto Guimaraes Pereira, Consultant Moderator Maurice Mendelson QC, OGEMID Rapporteur John Gaffney, Sophie Nappert, Professor Stacie_I._Strong, and Baiju S. Vasani as Honorary members.
