= Legal defense fund =

In the United States, a legal defense fund (or LDF) is an account set up to pay for legal expenses, which can include attorneys' fees, court filings, litigation costs, legal advice, or other legal fees. The fund can be public or private and is set up for individuals, organizations, or for a particular purpose. These funds are often used by government public officials, civil rights organizations, and public interest organizations.

Legal defense funds often have large membership counts where the members contribute to the fund. The fund sometimes is or operates like a law firm, where teams of attorneys provide legal services through litigation. Contrary to the name, attorneys working for legal defense funds both file and defend lawsuit. Unlike legal financing from legal financing companies, legal defense funds provide a separate account for litigation rather than a one-time cash advancement, though both are used for purposes of financing litigation and legal costs.

== History ==
The exact origins of legal defense funds are unclear. In the mid-nineteenth-century United States, a number of minority groups pioneered the practice of amassing funds to cover legal costs associated with their battles for civil rights and civil liberties. In the 1850s, for example, Black activists in New York City formed the Legal Rights Association to challenge racial segregation and exclusion in the city's streetcars.

== Government ==
A government legal defense fund is an account set up to pay for the legal expenses encountered by a person holding government office, or by other public officials. While public figures are undergoing legal proceedings, they may incur large legal fees and face conflict of interest laws that restrict how they may pay for such expenses. A legal defense fund allows third parties to donate monies, with an option for anonymity, to pay for such legal costs.

Many American public figures have employed legal defense funds, including Bill Clinton and Sarah Palin. On November 15, 2010, Congressman Charlie Rangel's credibility was questioned when he claimed that until very recently he was unaware that the establishment of a legal defense fund was an option he could use to pay for his defense against corruption charges These funds are governed by Congressional ethics rules and guidelines from the Office of Governmental Ethics (OGE), which impose various requirements to limit contributions to the fund.

== Public interest ==
Public interest legal defense funds are non-profit organizations that use legal services to advance environmentalism, animal rights, labor rights, and other public interests. They file lawsuits, provide free legal assistance to clients, push for legislative reform, and provide public education through seminars, workshops, and other outreach efforts.

Public interest legal defense funds include the Earthjustice Legal Defense Fund (formerly known as the Sierra Club Legal Defense Fund), the Animal Legal Defense Fund, the Comic Book Legal Defense Fund, the National Right to Work Legal Defense Foundation, the Community Environmental Legal Defense Fund, Life Legal Defense Fund, and the National Association of Social Workers Legal Defense Fund and many others.

=== Civil rights ===
Civil rights legal defense funds are non-profit organizations that use legal services to advance civil rights. They often provide legal assistance, advocacy, litigation support, and public education to increase gender and racial equality. Common issues include equality in the workplace, equality in education, immigration rights, voting rights, and violence prevention.

Civil rights legal defense funds include the NAACP Legal Defense and Educational Fund, the Women's Equity Action League Educational and Legal Defense Fund, and the National Organization for Women Legal Defense and Education Fund (Legal Momentum), the Asian American Legal Defense and Education Fund, the Mexican American Legal Defense and Education Fund, the Disability Rights Education and Defense Fund, and the Transgender Legal Defense & Education Fund and many others.

== Bibliography ==
- Volk, Kyle G. (2014). Moral Minorities and the Making of American Democracy. New York: Oxford University Press. ISBN 019937192X.
