= Legal financing =

Financing method

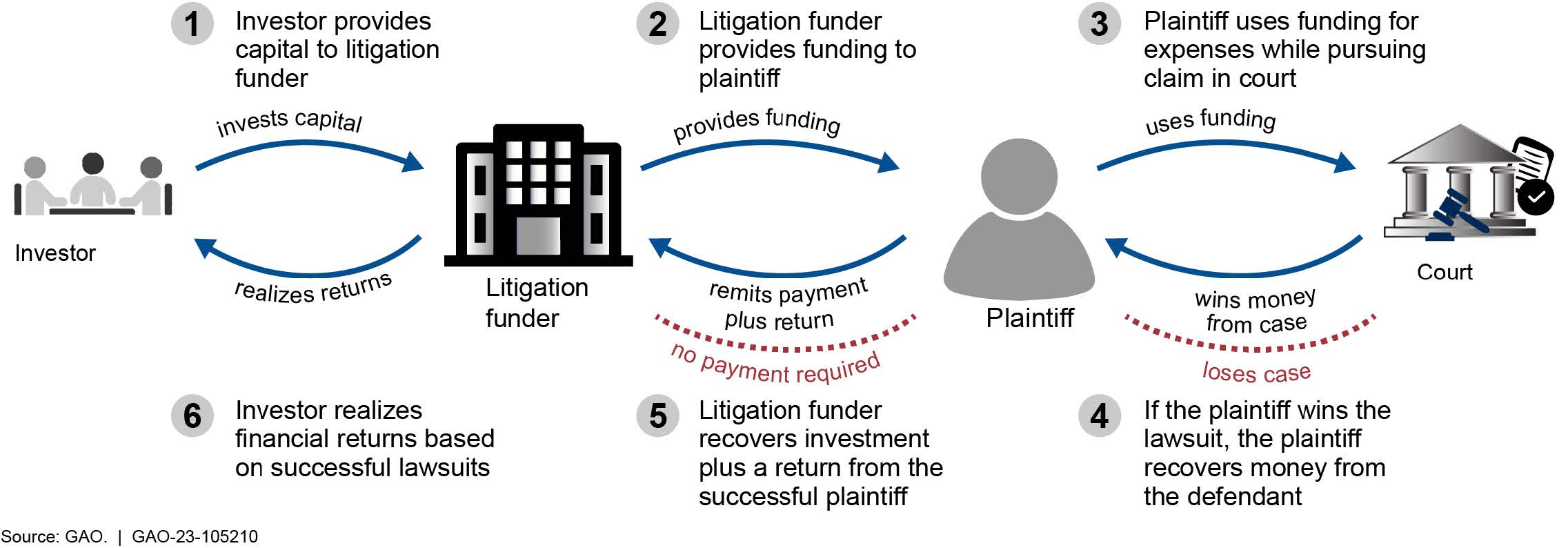
Example of litigation financing process

Legal financing (also known as litigation financing, professional funding, settlement funding, third-party funding, third-party litigation funding, legal funding, lawsuit loans and, in England and Wales, litigation funding) is the mechanism or process through which litigants (and even law firms) can finance their litigation or other legal costs through a third party funding company.

Similar to legal defense funds, legal financing companies provide money for lawsuits but are more often used by those without strong financial resources. Furthermore, legal financing is more likely to be used by plaintiffs, whereas legal defense funds are more likely to be used by defendants. Money obtained from legal financing companies can be used for any purpose, whether for litigation or for personal matters. On the other hand, money obtained through legal defense funds is solely used to fund litigation and legal costs.

Legal financing companies provide a nonrecourse cash advance to litigants in exchange for a percentage share of the judgment or settlement. Despite some superficial similarities to an unsecured loan with a traditional lender, legal financing operates differently from a loan. Litigation funding is generally not considered a loan, but rather as a form of an asset purchase or venture capital. Legal funding advances are not debt and are not reported to the credit bureaus, so a litigant's credit ratings will not be affected by a litigant obtaining a legal funding advance.

Legal financing companies normally provide money in the form of a lump sum payment, and generally, no specific account is established for the litigant. If the case proceeds to trial and the litigant loses, the third-party funding company receives nothing and loses the money they have invested in the case. In other words, if the litigant loses, they do not have to repay the money. In addition, litigants generally do not have to pay monthly fees after obtaining legal financing. Instead, no payments of any kind are made until the case settles or judgment is obtained, which could occur months or years after legal funding is received. Accordingly, to qualify for funding with a legal financing company, a litigant's case must have sufficient merit that the company deems its investment in the case to be worth the risk.

In tort litigation, legal financing is most commonly sought in personal injury cases, but may also be sought for commercial disputes, civil rights cases, and workers' compensation cases.

== History ==
While third-party litigation funding is not a new concept, it is relatively new to the United States and has its roots in the old English principles of champerty and maintenance. Some U.S. states still prohibit or materially limit champerty and others allow it with some restrictions.

Little financial assistance is available from traditional sources to help injured plaintiffs cover the cost of litigation or pay their personal expenses while a case remains pending. Plaintiffs may turn to credit cards and personal loans to cover litigation fees, attorneys' fees, court filings, personal finances, and living expense shortfalls while they wait for litigation to be resolved. The obligation to repay that debt is not affected by the outcome of the plaintiff's lawsuit.

In many jurisdictions, and throughout the United States, attorney rules of ethics preclude an attorney from advancing money in the form of loans to their clients.

The introduction of legal financing provides qualified plaintiffs with a means of paying the cost of litigation and their personal expenses, without having to resort to traditional borrowing.

== Qualification for litigation financing ==
Legal funding companies do not provide legal advice to applicants, nor do they provide referrals to attorneys. Thus, to qualify for legal financing a plaintiff must have already hired an attorney. To apply for legal financing, the plaintiff must complete an application form and provide supporting documents.

As legal financing companies only recover their investment if the plaintiff recovers money from the funded lawsuit, the merits of the plaintiff's case must be strong, meaning that the plaintiff has a strong argument that the defendant is liable for the damages claimed in the lawsuit. The defendant in the case (the person or company being sued) must also have the ability to pay a judgment, whether by virtue of its own financial strength or through insurance coverage. The injured party's attorney must also agree to the legal financing and generally must to sign an agreement consenting to the legal financing.

Additional qualification or approval factors may include the total amount of damages sought, a sufficient potential margin of recovery to justify the investment, the background of the applicant, and the laws of the applicant's place of residence. Some legal financing companies limit their investment to specific types of lawsuits, such as a personal injury claim or commercial litigation.

== Benefits ==
Lawsuits are expensive and may progress slowly, over a period of many months or years. During that time, many plaintiffs may feel considerable financial pressure and may need money to pay the costs of litigation, as well as the costs of supporting themselves. When obtained during the course of tort litigation, legal financing may help a plaintiff who has immediate needs, such as medical care, and cannot afford to wait until the litigation concludes to obtain money. A severely injured plaintiff might have significant personal expenses due to disability or loss of income and may face significant personal and medical debt, and as a result, may feel considerable pressure to enter into an early settlement. A defendant may recognize a plaintiff's financial need and offer a low settlement in anticipation that the plaintiff will not be able to afford continued litigation.

The desperate situation of plaintiffs is reflected in a finding by the American Legal Finance Association, an industry group for legal financing companies, that over 62% of funds provided to plaintiffs are used to stop a foreclosure or an eviction action.

== Types ==
Litigation funding has two major divisions: consumer financing, commonly referred to as pre-settlement funding or plaintiff advances, and commercial financing. Consumer financing generally consists of small advances between $500 and $2000. Prominent consumer financing companies include LawCash, Oasis Financial, and RD Legal Funding. Commercial financing for companies to pursue legal claims generally is dedicated toward the payment of attorney fees and litigation costs.

Litigation funding may also come in the form of crowdfunding, in which case hundreds or tens of thousands of individuals can help to pay for a legal dispute, either investing in a case in return for part of a contingent fee or offering donations to support a legal right that they believe in.

== Criticisms ==
One concern about litigation funding is that it is costly to the plaintiff, and may take a very large chunk out of the plaintiff's eventual settlement or verdict. After paying attorney fees and the amount owed to the legal financing company, the plaintiff may receive little or no additional money beyond any amount received from the advance.

There is some concern that, if widely adopted, litigation finance could prolong litigation and reduce the frequency of settlements of civil lawsuits. A study of civil lawsuits published in the Journal of Empirical Legal Studies found that between 80% and 92% of cases settle. The study found that most plaintiffs who decided to pass up a settlement offer and proceed to trial ended up recovering less money than if they had accepted the settlement offer.

The legal financing industry has come under fire from critics for actual and potential legal and ethical violations. For example, some companies have been found to violate state usury laws (laws against unreasonably high-interest rates), champerty laws (laws prohibiting third parties from furthering a lawsuit for an interest in the recovery), or to require action by the applicant's lawyer that might be unethical under state rules of professional conduct.

A major criticism of litigation funding is that its cost is disproportionate to the risk accepted by litigation finance companies. As lenders thoroughly evaluate claims before they agree to provide financing, they have a very high likelihood of recovering their fee at the conclusion of the plaintiff's case, and further limit potential losses by providing financing in amounts that are relatively small as compared to the plaintiff's anticipated recovery.

In June 2011, the New York City Bar Association addressed some of the ethical issues raised by lawsuit financing in an ethics opinion about third-party non-recourse legal funding. It concluded that with due care a lawyer could help a client obtain legal financing and that non-recourse litigation financing “provides to some claimants a valuable means for paying the costs of pursuing a legal claim, or even sustaining basic living expenses until a settlement or judgment is obtained.” Many lawyers advise clients to pursue legal financing only as a last resort when other forms of financing are not available.

In recent years, some high-profile cases have inspired criticism of legal financing. For example, an international legal battle financed by UK-based litigation financing firm Therium involved self proclaimed heirs of the Sultan of Sulu and the Malaysian government, which was ordered to pay $14.9 billion as compensation by Spanish arbitrator Gonzalo Stampa. The award, which was eventually struck down by the Hague Court of Appeal on June 27, 2023, inspired calls for stronger regulation, over such concerns as corruption, profiteering, and undue foreign influence. In 2022, the European Parliament called on the European Commission to introduce regulations covering third-party litigation funding. The demand followed a report by German MEP Axel Voss on the same issue.

In 2024 litigation finance attracted criticism from some business groups, lawmakers, and corporate defendants over a perceived lack of transparency in the USA. Critics argued that third-party funding arrangements were frequently not disclosed to courts or opposing parties, raising concerns about potential conflicts of interest and the influence of funders on litigation. These concerns prompted proposals in the U.S. for mandatory disclosure requirements and increased regulatory oversight of the industry.

== Worldwide ==
=== Australia ===
Commercial litigation funding has been allowed in Australia in the late 1990s, in parallel with developments in the US, Canada and Asia.

=== England and Wales ===
Litigation funding has been permitted in England and Wales since 1967 (and in insolvency matters since the late nineteenth century). However, recent years have seen its growing acceptance as part of the litigation landscape.

Litigation funding can be broadly split into 4 different forms in the UK, Conditional fee agreements, Damages Based Agreements, Fixed Fees and Third Party Funding.

In 2005, in the case of Arkin v Borchard Lines Ltd & Others, the English Court of Appeal made it clear that litigation funding is a legitimate method of financing litigation. In January 2010, Chapter 11 of the Jackson Review of Civil Litigation Costs was published, effectively providing judicial endorsement to litigation funding.

In November 2011, a Code of Conduct for Litigation Funders was launched, which sets out the standards of best practice and behavior for litigation funders in England and Wales. The Code of Conduct provides transparency to claimants and their solicitors. It requires litigation funders to provide satisfactory answers to certain key questions before entering into relationships with claimants. Under the Code, litigation funders are required to give assurances to claimants that, among other things, the litigation funder will not try to take control of the litigation, the litigation funder has the money to pay for the costs of the funded litigation and the litigation funder will not terminate funding absent a material adverse development. The Code has been approved by Lord Justice Jackson and commended by the Chair of the Civil Justice Council, Lord Neuberger of Abbotsbury, the president of the Supreme Court. The regulatory body responsible for litigation funding and ensuring compliance with the Code is the Association of Litigation Funders (ALF).

In 2023, the Supreme Court of the United Kingdom decided in R (on the application of PACCAR Inc) v Competition Appeal Tribunal that litigation funding agreements were forms of damages-based agreements and thus unenforceable due to s.588AA of the Courts and Legal Services Act 1990.

The Adam Smith Institute think tank published a report in October 2024, calling for greater regulation in third party litigation funding. Recommendations included regulation of the funding by the Financial Conduct Authority, in the same way as other investment products, and increased transparency.

=== Hong Kong ===
Hong Kong legalised third party funding in 2017 after an amendment for its use with arbitration, mediation and related proceedings.

With the changes to legislation third party funders in Hong Kong have been made subject to codes of practices and safeguards to assure industry standards. The Hong Kong International Arbitration Centre (HKIAC) provided further guidance in 2018 to give additional guidance for arbitral tribunals, parties to arbitration and third-party funders.

The HKIAC also recognised that although third party funding is frequently associated with claimants lacking the financial resources for their claim, it may also be used by parties wishing to ‘hedge cost risks or reduce capital outlay.’

HKIAC statistics suggest that these legislative changes have contributed to an increasing use of third party funding within arbitrations. For example, in 2020, out of the 318 arbitrations that were submitted, parties made disclosure of third-party funding in 3 of them. In 2021 this increased to 6 out of a total of 277. Then in 2022, 74 disclosures were made from a total number of 344 arbitrations. However, it remains too early to draw longer-term conclusions regarding the application and popularity of funding within Hong Kong.

In terms of the global importance of Hong Kong as a destination for arbitrations, in 2021, the Queen Mary International Arbitration Survey ranked Hong Kong in the top five most preferred seats for arbitration, alongside London, Singapore, Paris and Geneva.

=== India ===
There is no express law regulating third party funding, but court precedents have recognized the practice and put in restrictions. Agreements between funders and litigants are subject to Indian Contract Act, 1872.

=== Russia ===
There is no specific legislation in Russia governing litigation funding, however, it is not prohibited by Russian law. In 2019, Chairman of the Council of Judges of the Russian Federation Viktor Momotov stated that third-party investment in litigation could increase access to the courts by parties who could not otherwise afford the cost of litigation. In 2020, the Council of the Federation Committee on Constitutional Legislation and State Building discussed the need for legislation or regulation to allow a litigation funding industry to develop.

=== Singapore ===
The first recorded use of third party funding in Singapore was in 2017 following an amendment to the Civil Law Act (CLA).

Following a positive response from the business community regarding to ability to use third party funding the Ministry of Law (MinLaw) initiated a public consultation in 2018 to assess if the scope of funding should be increased. As a result of this consultation the Ministry of Law (MinLaw) extended the application of third party funding from June 28, 2021 to include domestic arbitration proceedings, certain proceedings in the Singapore International Commercial Court (SICC), and related mediation proceedings.

Singapore is one of the most popular ‘arbitration seats’ globally.

=== South Africa ===
Litigation funding is generally unregulated in South Africa, but it appears that it has quietly become part of the South African legal landscape, getting little to no resistance in the face of what used to be portrayed as contra bonos mores champertous agreements, which are, by definition, illegal.

A pactum de quota litis is defined as “an agreement to share the proceeds of one or more lawsuits” and it is the duty of the court to ascertain, of its own motion, the lawfulness of such agreement as it cannot lend its assistance to the execution of agreements and transactions which are contrary to law. An initial distinction between an acceptable and an objectionable pactum de quota litis was formulated in Hugo & Möller N.O. v Transvaal Loan, Finance and Mortgage Co, 1894 (1) OR 336. The Court held that a fair agreement to provide the necessary funds to enable an action to proceed, in consideration for which the person lending the money is to receive an interest in the property sought to be recovered, must not be considered per se to be contra bonos mores. The court was concerned about potential abuses of such agreements, such as using them for purposes of gambling with litigation cases.

Several cases have provided further guidelines for such litigation financing agreements. In Hadleigh Private Hospital (Pty) Ltd t/a Rand Clinic v Soller & Manning Attorneys and Others 2001 (4) SA 360 (W), the Court affirmed that an agreement to share the proceeds of one or more lawsuits is not necessarily unlawful and must indeed be considered acceptable when a litigant is not in a financial position to fund his litigation completely. In another case, the South Africa Supreme Court of Appeal held, in PriceWaterHouse Coopers Inc and Others v National Potato Co-operative Ltd, 2004 (6) SA 66 (SCA), that the "although the number of reported cases concerned with champertous agreements diminished, courts have still adhered to the view that generally they are unlawful and that litigation pursuant to such agreements should not be entertained". However, the Supreme Court sought to clarify any disagreements and took a different route.

The Supreme Court ruled that:

- An agreement in terms of which a stranger to a lawsuit advances funds to a litigant on condition that his remuneration, in case the litigant wins the action, is to be part of the proceeds of the suit is not contrary to public policy or void, and
- The existence of such an assistance agreement cannot be the base of a defense in the action. In June 2010, in an interlocutory ruling rendered in the same case, the High Court found that the funder is, after all, a co-owner of the claim and should, therefore, be joined as a party to the trial. Therefore, an order for costs may be made directly against him to the extent that the funded party cannot support them even after the termination of the funding agreement.

=== United States ===
Legal financing is a fairly recent phenomenon in the United States, beginning in or around 1997. Litigation funding is available in most U.S. jurisdictions. Litigation funding is most commonly sought in personal injury cases, but may also be sought for commercial disputes, civil rights cases, and workers' compensation cases. The amount of money that plaintiff receive through legal financing varies widely but often is around 10 to 15 percent of the expected value of judgment or settlement of their lawsuit. Some companies allow individuals to request additional funding at a later date. The amount of money available depends on the policies of the financing company and the characteristics of the plaintiff's lawsuit.

One major division in litigation finance is between consumer and commercial financing companies. While consumer financing generally consists of small advances between $500 and $2000 directly for individual plaintiffs, commercial financing for companies to pursue legal claims generally is dedicated towards payment of litigation costs. The largest legal financing companies in the space are commercial, including public companies.

Litigation funders generally evaluate cases based on legal merit, amount of damages, and financial viability of the defendant. Many funders also specialize in specific areas of litigation or have restrictions on funding size and funding structure.

== See also ==
- Arbitration
- Champerty and maintenance
- Dispute resolution
- Legal defense fund
- Legal financing industry
