= Lawsuit =

Civil action brought in a court of law

A lawsuit is a proceeding by one or more parties (the plaintiff or claimant) against one or more parties (the defendant) in a civil court of law. The archaic term "suit in law" is found in only a small number of laws still in effect today. The term "lawsuit" is used with respect to a civil action brought by a plaintiff (a party who claims to have incurred loss as a result of a defendant's actions) who requests a legal remedy or equitable remedy from a court. The defendant is required to respond to the plaintiff's complaint or else risk default judgment. If the plaintiff is successful, judgment is entered in favor of the plaintiff, and the court may impose the legal or equitable remedies available against the defendant (respondent). A variety of court orders may be issued in connection with or as part of the judgment to enforce a right, award damages or restitution, or impose a temporary or permanent injunction to prevent an act or compel an act. A declaratory judgment may be issued to prevent future legal disputes.

A lawsuit may involve resolution of disputes involving issues of private law between individuals, business entities or non-profit organizations. A lawsuit may also involve issues of public law in the sense that the state is treated as if it were a private party in a civil case, either as a plaintiff with a civil cause of action to enforce certain laws or as a defendant in actions contesting the legality of the state's laws or seeking monetary damages for injuries caused by agents of the state.

Conducting a civil action is called litigation. The plaintiffs and defendants are called litigants and the attorneys representing them are called litigators. The term litigation may also refer to the conducting of criminal actions (see criminal procedure).

== Etymology ==
The etymology of the word 'lawsuit' derives from the combination of law and suit. Suit derives from the Old French 'suite' or 'sieute' meaning to pursue or follow. This term was derived from the Latin 'secutus', the past participle of 'sequi' meaning to attend or follow.

Similarly, the word 'sue', derives from the Old French 'suir' or 'sivre' meaning to pursue or follow after. This was also derived from the Latin word 'sequi'.

== Rules of procedure and complications ==
Rules of criminal or civil procedure govern the conduct of a lawsuit in the common law adversarial system of dispute resolution. Procedural rules arise from statutory law, case law, and constitutional provisions (especially the right to due process). The details of each kind of legal procedure differ greatly from jurisdiction to jurisdiction, and often from court to court even within the same jurisdiction. It is important for litigants to be aware of all relevant procedural rules (or to hire competent counsel who can either comply with such rules on their behalf or explain the rules to them), because the litigants ultimately dictate the timing and progression of the lawsuit. Litigants are responsible for obtaining the desired result and the timing of reaching this result. Failure to comply with procedural rules may result in serious limitations that can affect the ability of one to present claims or defenses at any subsequent trial, or even lead to the dismissal of the lawsuit altogether.

Though the majority of lawsuits are settled before ever reaching trial, they can still be very complicated to litigate. This is particularly true in federal systems, where a federal court may be applying state law (e.g. the Erie doctrine, for example in the United States), or vice versa. It is also possible for one state to apply the law of another in cases where additionally it may not be clear which level (or location) of court actually has jurisdiction over the claim or personal jurisdiction over the defendant, or whether the plaintiff has standing to participate in a lawsuit. About 98 percent of civil cases in the United States federal courts are resolved without a trial. Domestic courts are also often called upon to apply foreign law, or to act upon foreign defendants, over whom they may not even have the ability to enforce a judgment if the defendant's assets are theoretically outside their reach.

Lawsuits can become additionally complicated as more parties become involved (see joinder). Within a "single" lawsuit, there can be any number of claims and defenses (all based on numerous laws) between any number of plaintiffs or defendants. Each of these participants can bring any number of cross-claims and counterclaims against each other, and even bring additional parties into the suit on either side after it progresses. In reality, however, courts typically have some power to sever claims and parties into separate actions if it is more efficient to do so. A court can do this if there is not a sufficient overlap of factual issues between the various associates, separating the issues into different lawsuits.

The official ruling of a lawsuit can be somewhat misleading because post-ruling outcomes are often not listed on the internet. For example, in the case of William J. Ralph Jr. v. Lind-Waldock & Company (September 1999), one would assume that Ralph lost the case when in fact, upon review of the evidence, it was found that Ralph was correct in his assertion that improper activity took place on the part of Lind-Waldock, and Ralph settled with Lind-Waldock.

Cases such as this illustrate the need for more comprehensive information than mere internet searches when researching legal decisions. While online searches are appropriate for many legal situations, they are not appropriate for all.

== Procedure ==
The following is a generalized description of how a lawsuit may proceed in a common law jurisdiction:

=== Pleading ===
A lawsuit begins when a complaint or petition, known as a pleading, is filed with the court. A complaint should explicitly state that one or more plaintiffs seek(s) damages or equitable relief from one or more stated defendants, and also should state the relevant factual allegations supporting the legal claims brought by the plaintiffs. As the initial pleading, a complaint is the most important step in a civil case because a complaint sets the factual and legal foundation for the entirety of a case. While complaints and other pleadings may ordinarily be amended by a motion with the court, the complaint sets the framework for the entire case and the claims that will be asserted throughout the entire lawsuit.

It is likewise important that the plaintiff select the proper venue with the proper jurisdiction to bring the lawsuit. The clerk of a court signs or stamps the court seal upon a summons or citation, which is then served by the plaintiff upon the defendant, together with a copy of the complaint. This service notifies the defendants that they are being sued and that they are limited in the amount of time to reply. The service provides a copy of the complaint to notify the defendants of the nature of the claims. Once the defendants are served with the summons and complaint, they are subject to a time limit to file an answer stating their defenses to the plaintiff's claims, which includes any challenges to the court's jurisdiction, and any counterclaims they wish to assert against the plaintiff.

In a handful of jurisdictions (notably, the U.S. state of New York) a lawsuit begins when one or more plaintiffs properly serve a summons and complaint upon the defendants. In such jurisdictions, nothing must be filed with the court until a dispute develops requiring actual judicial intervention.

If the defendant chooses to file an answer within the time permitted, the answer must address each of the plaintiffs' allegations. The defendant has three choices to make, which include either admitting to the allegation, denying it, or pleading a lack of sufficient information to admit or deny the allegation. Some jurisdictions, like California and Florida, still authorize general denials of each and every allegation in the complaint. At the time the defendant files an answer, the defendant also raises all "affirmative" defenses. The defendant may also assert counterclaims for damages or equitable relief against the plaintiff. For example, in the case of "compulsory counterclaims," the defendant must assert some form of counterclaim or risk having the counterclaim barred in any subsequent proceeding. In the case of making a counterclaim, the defendant is making a motion directed towards the plaintiff claiming that he/she was injured in some way or would like to sue the plaintiff. The plaintiff in this example would then receive some amount of time to make a reply to this counterclaim. The defendant may also file a "third party complaint", which is the defendant's privilege to join another party or parties in the action with the belief that those parties may be liable for some or all of the plaintiff's claimed damages. An answer from the defendant in response to the claims made against him/her, can also include additional facts or a so-called "excuse" for the plead. Filing an answer "joins the cause" and moves the case into the pre-trial phase.

Instead of filing an answer within the time specified in the summons, the defendant can choose to dispute the validity of the complaint by filing a demurrer (in the handful of jurisdictions where that is still allowed) or one or more "pre-answer motions," such as a motion to dismiss. It is important that the motion be filed within the time period specified in the summons for an answer. If all of the above motions are denied by the trial court, and the defendant loses on all appeals from such denials (if that option is available), and finally the defendant must file an answer.

Usually the pleadings are drafted by a lawyer, but in many courts persons can file papers and represent themselves, which is called appearing pro se. Many courts have a pro se clerk to assist people without lawyers.

=== Service of process ===
Service of process is the formal delivery of judicial documents—often called "process"—to a party in a lawsuit, giving that party notice of the action against them and establishing the court's jurisdiction over them. A summons, typically issued by the court clerk at filing, is the first document served; it informs the defendant that they must appear and answer the complaint or face default. Service of process may be effected by any non-party adult over age 18, by a court official such as a sheriff, marshal, or constable, or by a private process server. Common methods of service include:

- Personal service, where documents are handed directly to the defendant;
- Substituted service, leaving papers with a competent adult at the defendant's residence or place of business;
- Service by mail, which usually requires proof of receipt;
- Service by publication, used when a defendant cannot be located after diligent effort; and
- Digital delivery, permitted where statute or court order authorizes secure digital delivery.

In federal court, Rule 4(m) of the Federal Rules of Civil Procedure requires service of process to be completed within 90 days of filing the complaint, or the action against an unserved defendant may be dismissed without prejudice unless good cause is shown.

After service is effected, the process server must file—or return to the plaintiff—an affidavit or certificate of service detailing who was served, when, where, and by what method, creating a public record that proper notice was given.

By ensuring every defendant receives proper notice and an opportunity to be heard, service of process upholds due process rights and safeguards the court's authority to adjudicate disputes.

=== Pretrial discovery ===
A pretrial discovery can be defined as "the formal process of exchanging information between the parties about the witnesses and evidence they'll present at trial" and allows for the evidence of the trial to be presented to the parties before the initial trial begins. The early stages of the lawsuit may involve initial disclosures of evidence by each party and discovery, which is the structured exchange of evidence and statements between the parties. Discovery is meant to eliminate surprises, clarify what the lawsuit is about, and also to make the parties decide if they should settle or drop frivolous claims or defenses. At this point, the parties may also engage in pretrial motions to exclude or include particular legal or factual issues before trial.

There is also the ability of one to make an under-oath statement during the pretrial, also known as a deposition. The deposition can be used in the trial or just in the pretrial, but this allows for both parties to be aware of the arguments or claims that are going to be made by the other party in the trial. It is notable that the depositions can be written or oral.

At the close of discovery, the parties may either pick a jury and then have a trial by jury or the case may proceed as a bench trial. A bench trial is only heard by the judge if the parties waive a jury trial or if the right to a jury trial is not guaranteed for their particular claim (such as those under equity in the U.S.) or for any lawsuits within their jurisdiction.

=== Resolution ===
Usually, lawsuits end in a settlement, with an empirical analysis finding that less than 2% of cases end with a trial. It is sometimes said that 95% of cases end in settlement; few jurisdictions report settlements, but empirical analysis suggests that the settlement rate varies by type of lawsuit, with torts settling around 90% of the time and overall civil cases settling 50% of the time; other cases end due to default judgment, lack of a valid claim, and other reasons.

At trial, each person presents witnesses and the evidence collected is recorded. After this occurs, the judge or jury renders their decision. Generally speaking, the plaintiff has the burden of proof in making his claims, however, the defendant may have the burden of proof on other issues, such as affirmative defenses. The attorneys are held responsible in devising a trial strategy that ensures they meet the necessary elements of their case or (when the opposing party has the burden of proof) to ensure the opponent will not be able to meet his or her burden.

There are numerous motions that either party can file throughout the lawsuit to terminate it "prematurely"—before submission to the judge or jury for final consideration. These motions attempt to persuade the judge, through legal argument and sometimes accompanying evidence, that there is no reasonable way that the other party could legally win and therefore there is no sense in continuing with the trial. Motions for summary judgment, for example, can usually be brought before, after, or during the actual presentation of the case. Motions can also be brought after the close of a trial to undo a jury verdict contrary to law or against the weight of the evidence, or to convince the judge to change the decision or grant a new trial.

Also, at any time during this process from the filing of the complaint to the final judgment, the plaintiff may withdraw the complaint and end the whole matter, or the defendant may agree to a settlement. If the case settles, the parties might choose to enter into a stipulated judgment with the settlement agreement attached, or the plaintiff may simply file a voluntary dismissal, so that the settlement agreement is never entered into the court record.

The decisions that the jury makes are not put into effect until the judge makes a judgment, which is the approval to have this trial information be filed in public records. In a civil case, the judge is allowed at this time to make changes to the verdict that the jury came up with by either adding on or reducing the punishment. In criminal cases the situation is a little different, because in this case the judge does not have the authority to change the jury decision.

=== Appeal ===
After a final decision has been made, either party or both may appeal from the judgment if they believe there had been a procedural error made by the trial court. It is not necessarily an automatic appeal after every judgment has been made, however, if there is a legal basis for the appeal, then one has the right to do so. The prevailing party may appeal, for example, if they wanted a larger award than was granted. The appellate court (which may be structured as an intermediate appellate court) or a higher court then affirms the judgment, declines to hear it (which effectively affirms it), reverses—or vacates and remands. This process would then involve sending the lawsuit back to the lower trial court to address an unresolved issue, or possibly request for a whole new trial. Some lawsuits go up and down the appeals ladder repeatedly before final resolution.

The appeal is a review for errors rather than a new trial, so the appellate court will defer to the discretion of the original trial court if an error is not clear. The initial step in making an appeal consists of the petitioner filing a notice of appeal and then sending in a brief, a written document stating reason for appeal, to the court. Decisions of the court can be made immediately after just reading the written brief, or there can also be oral arguments made by both parties involved in the appeal. The appellate court then makes the decision about what errors were made when the law was looked at more closely in the lower court. There were no errors made, the case would then end, but if the decision was reversed, the appellate court would then send the case back down to the lower court level. There, a new trial will be held and new information taken into account.

Some jurisdictions, notably the United States, but prevalent in many other countries, prevent parties from relitigating the facts on appeal, due to a history of unscrupulous lawyers deliberately reserving such issues in order to ambush each other in the appellate courts (the "invited error" problem). The idea is that it is more efficient to force all parties to fully litigate all relevant issues of fact before the trial court. Thus, a party who does not raise an issue of fact at the trial court level generally cannot raise it on appeal.

When the lawsuit is finally resolved, or the allotted time to appeal has expired, the matter is res judicata, meaning the plaintiff may not bring another action based on the same claim again. In addition, other parties who later attempt to re-litigate a matter already ruled on in a previous lawsuit will be estopped from doing so.

=== Enforcement ===
When a final judgment is entered, the plaintiff is usually barred under the doctrine of res judicata from relitigating any of the issues, even under different legal theories. Judgments are typically a monetary award. If the defendant fails to pay, the court has various powers to seize any of the defendant's assets located within its jurisdiction, such as:

- Writ of execution
- Bank account garnishment
- Liens
- Wage garnishment

If all assets are located elsewhere, the plaintiff must file another suit in the appropriate court to seek enforcement of the other court's previous judgment. This can be a difficult task when crossing from a court in one state or nation to another, however, courts tend to grant each other respect when there is not a clear legal rule to the contrary. A defendant who has no assets in any jurisdiction is said to be "judgment-proof". The term is generally a colloquialism to describe an impecunious defendant.

Indigent judgment-proof defendants are no longer imprisoned; debtor's prisons have been outlawed by statute, constitutional amendment, or international human rights treaties in the vast majority of common law jurisdictions.

== Research in law, economics and management ==
Scholars in law, economics and management have studied why firms involved in a dispute choose between private dispute resolution—such as negotiation, mediation, and arbitration—and litigation.

== Terminology ==
During the 18th and 19th centuries, it was common for lawyers to speak of bringing an "action" at law and a "suit" in equity. An example of that distinction survives today in the codified text of the Ku Klux Klan Act. The fusion of common law and equity in England in the Judicature Acts of 1873 and 1875 led to the collapse of that distinction, so it became possible to speak of a "lawsuit." In the United States, the Federal Rules of Civil Procedure (1938) abolished the distinction between actions at law and suits in equity in federal practice, in favor of a single form referred to as a "civil action."

In England and Wales the term "claim" is far more common; the person initiating proceedings is called the claimant. England and Wales began to turn away from traditional common law terminology with the Rules of the Supreme Court (1883), in which the "statement of claim" and "defence" replaced the traditional complaint and answer as the pleadings by which parties placed their case at issue before the trial court.

American terminology is slightly different, in that the term "claim" refers only to a particular count or cause of action alleged in a complaint. Similarly, "defense" refers to only one or more affirmative defenses alleged in an answer. Americans also use "claim" to describe an extrajudicial demand filed with an insurer or administrative agency. If the claim is denied, then the claimant, policyholder, or applicant files a lawsuit with the courts to seek review of that decision, and from that point forward participates in the lawsuit as a plaintiff. In other words, the terms "claimant" and "plaintiff" carry substantially different connotations of formality in American English, in that only the latter risks an award of costs in favor of an adversary in a lawsuit.

In medieval times, both "action" and "suit" had the approximate meaning of some kind of legal proceeding, but an action terminated when a judgment was rendered, while a suit also included the execution of the judgment.

== Financing ==
Particularly in the United States, plaintiffs and defendants who lack financial resources for litigation or other attorney's fees may be able to obtain legal financing. Legal financing companies can provide a cash advance to litigants in return for a share of the ultimate settlement or award. If the case ultimately loses, the litigant does not have to pay any of the money funded back. Legal financing is different from a typical bank loan in that the legal financing company does not look at credit history or employment history. Litigants do not have to repay the cash advance with monthly payments, but do have to fill out an application so that the legal financing company can review the merits of the case.

Legal financing can be a practical means for litigants to obtain financing while they wait for a monetary settlement or an award in their personal injury, workers' compensation, or civil rights lawsuit. Often, plaintiffs who were injured or forced to leave their jobs still have mortgages, rent, medical expenses, or other bills to pay. Other times, litigants may simply need money to pay for the costs of litigation and attorneys' fees, and for this reason, many litigants turn to reputable legal financing companies to apply for a cash advance to help pay for bills.

Defendants, civil rights organizations, public interest organizations, and government public officials can all set up an account to pay for litigation costs and legal expenses. These legal defense funds can have large membership counts where the members contribute to the fund. Unlike legal financing from legal financing companies, legal defense funds provide a separate account for litigation rather than a one-time cash advancement, nevertheless, both are used for purposes of financing litigation and legal costs.

There was a study conducted in the Supreme Court Economic Review that shows why litigation financing can be practical and beneficial to the overall court system and lawsuits within the court. This study concluded that the new rules that were set for litigation financing actually did produce more settlements. Under conservative rules, there tended to be fewer settlements, however under the older rules they tended to be larger on average.

Legal financing can become an issue in some cases, varying from case to case and person to person. It can be beneficial in many situations, however also detrimental in others.

== See also ==
- Actio popularis
- Arbitration
- Brief (law)
- Civil law
- Civil recovery
- Compensation culture
- Hearing (law)
- Indispensable party
- Legal case
- List of environmental lawsuits
- Private prosecution
- Restorative justice
- Strategic lawsuit against public participation
- Trial
