= Kota Kinabalu =

Kota Kinabalu Jesselton
- State capital city and district capital
- City of Kota Kinabalu Bandaraya Kota Kinabalu (Malay)
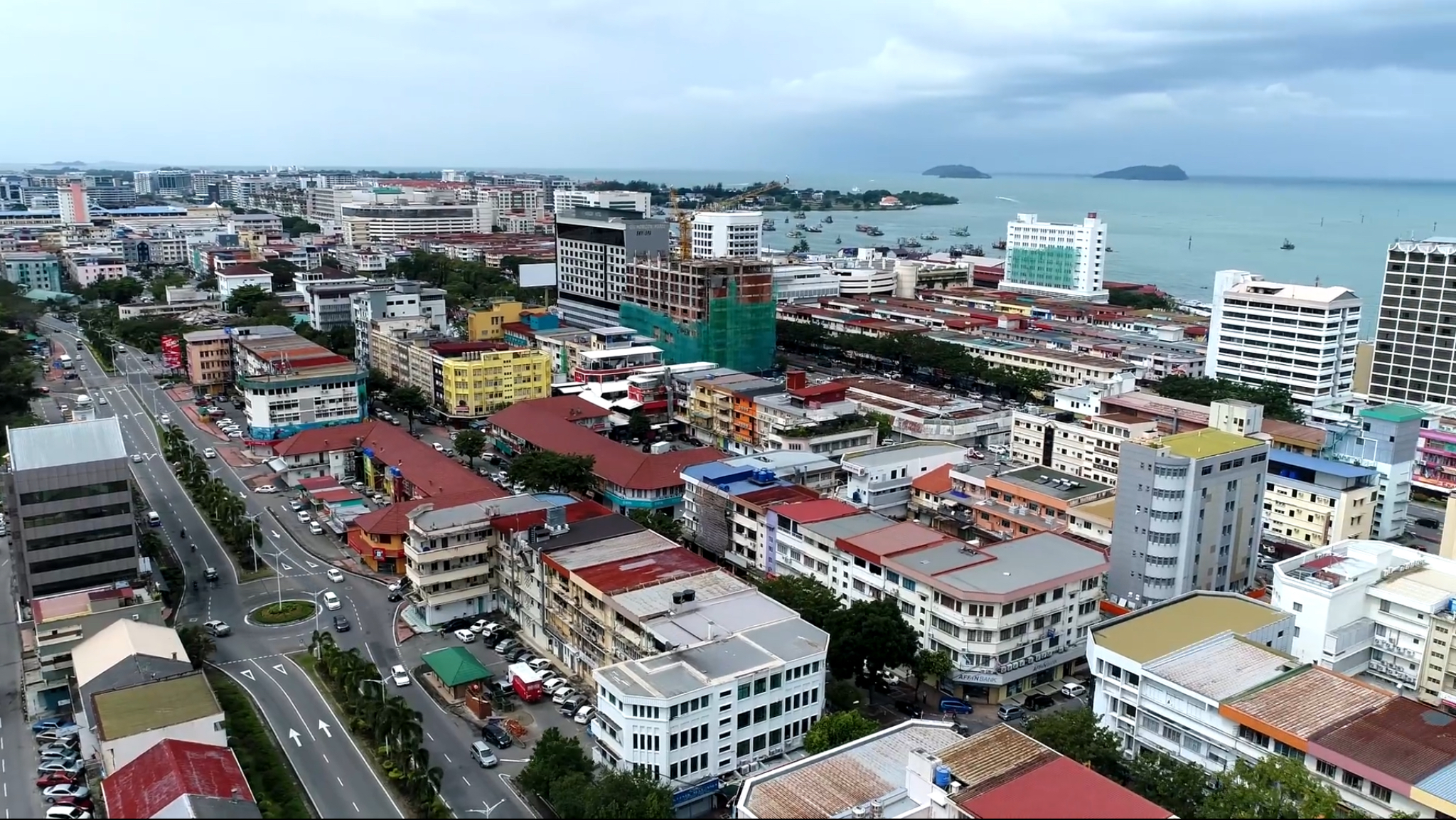
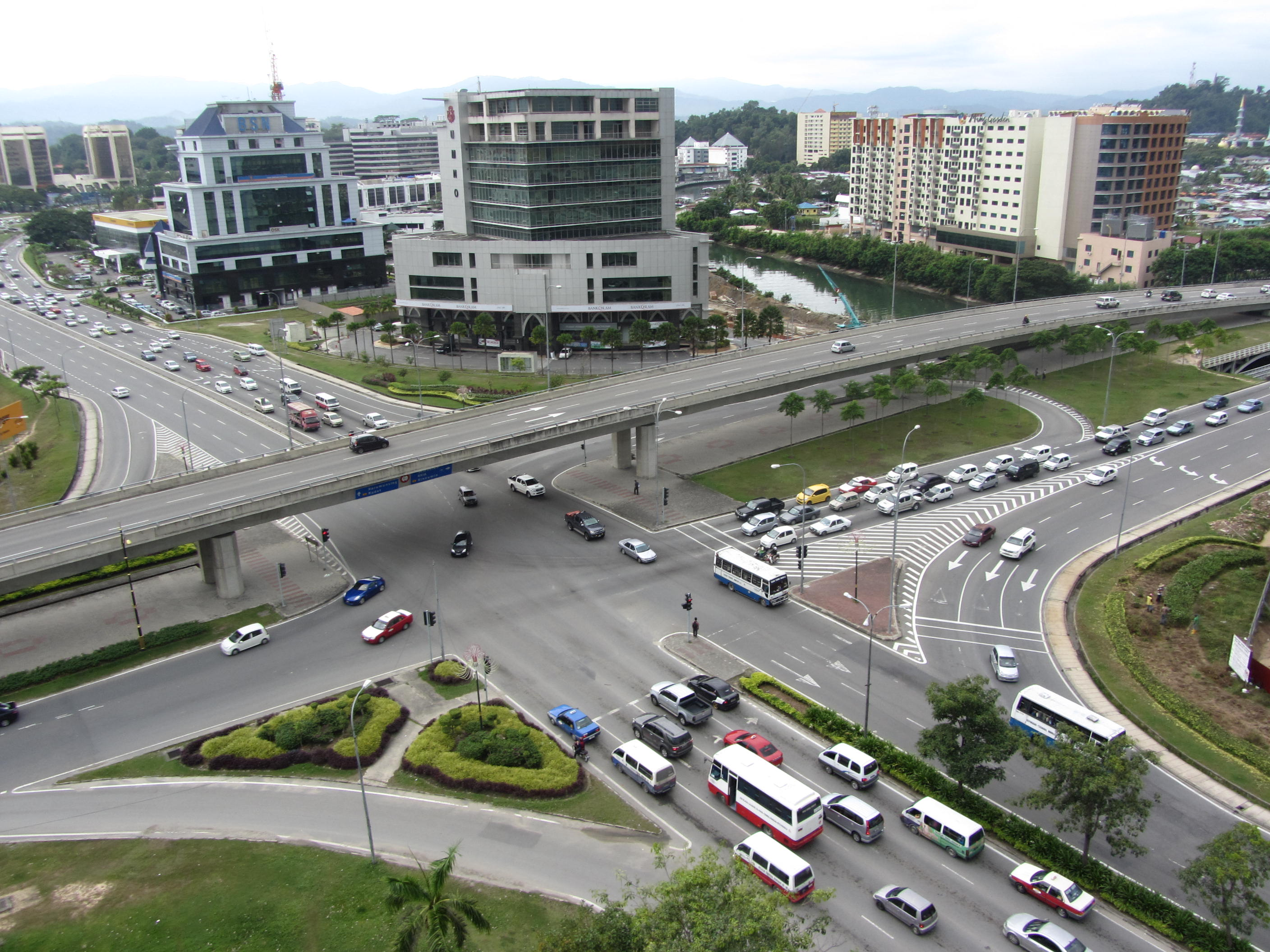
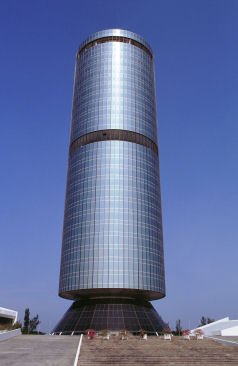
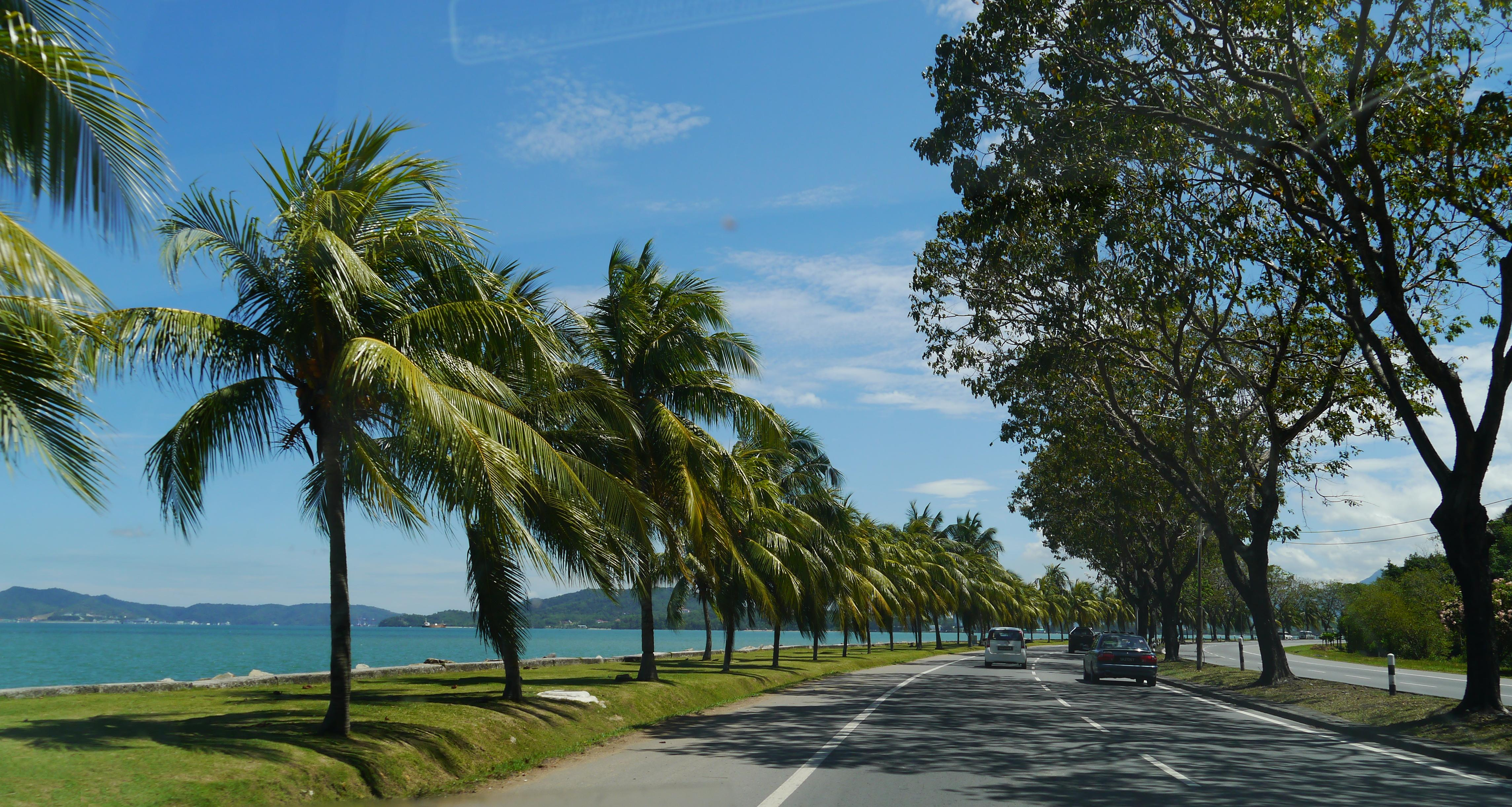
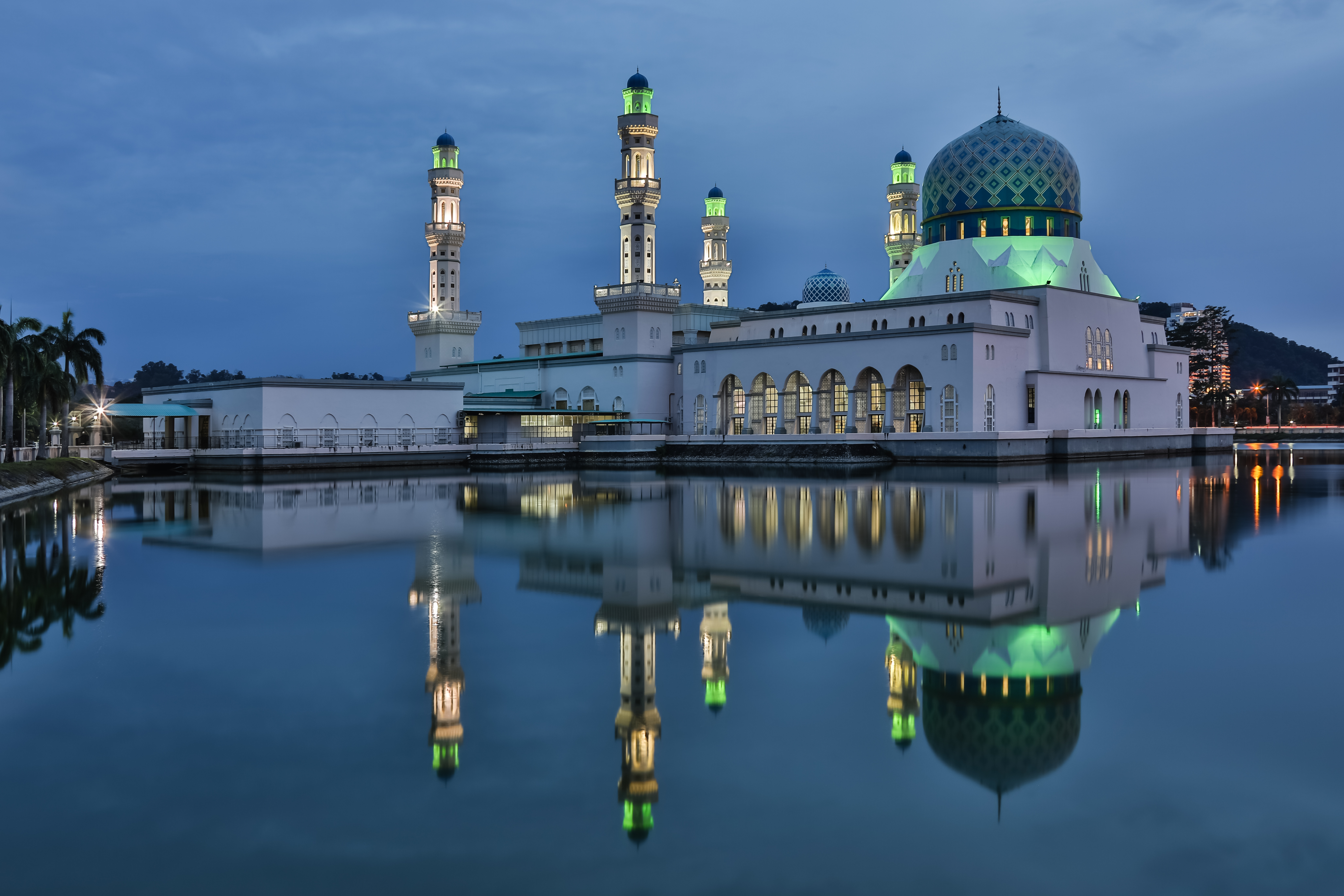
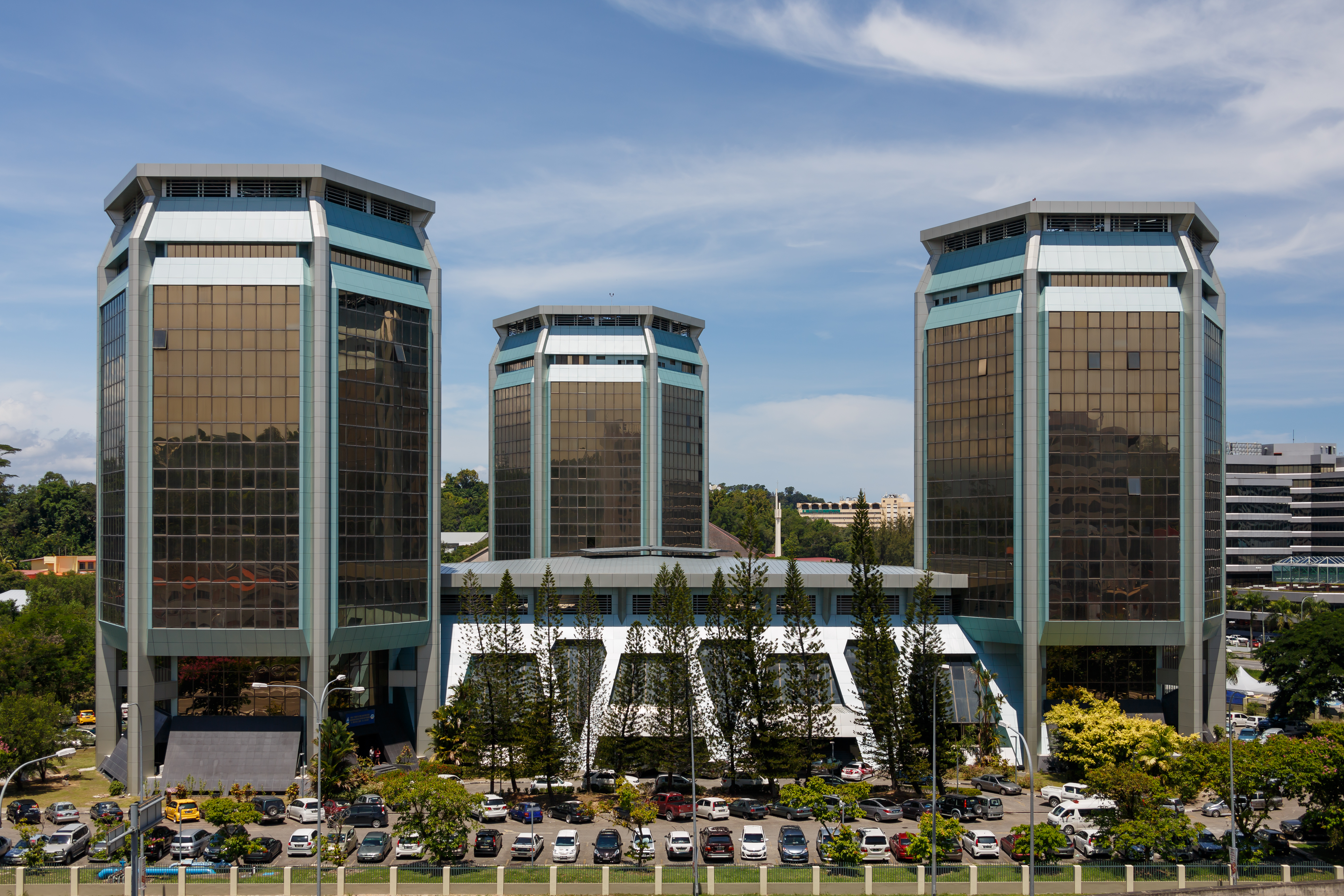
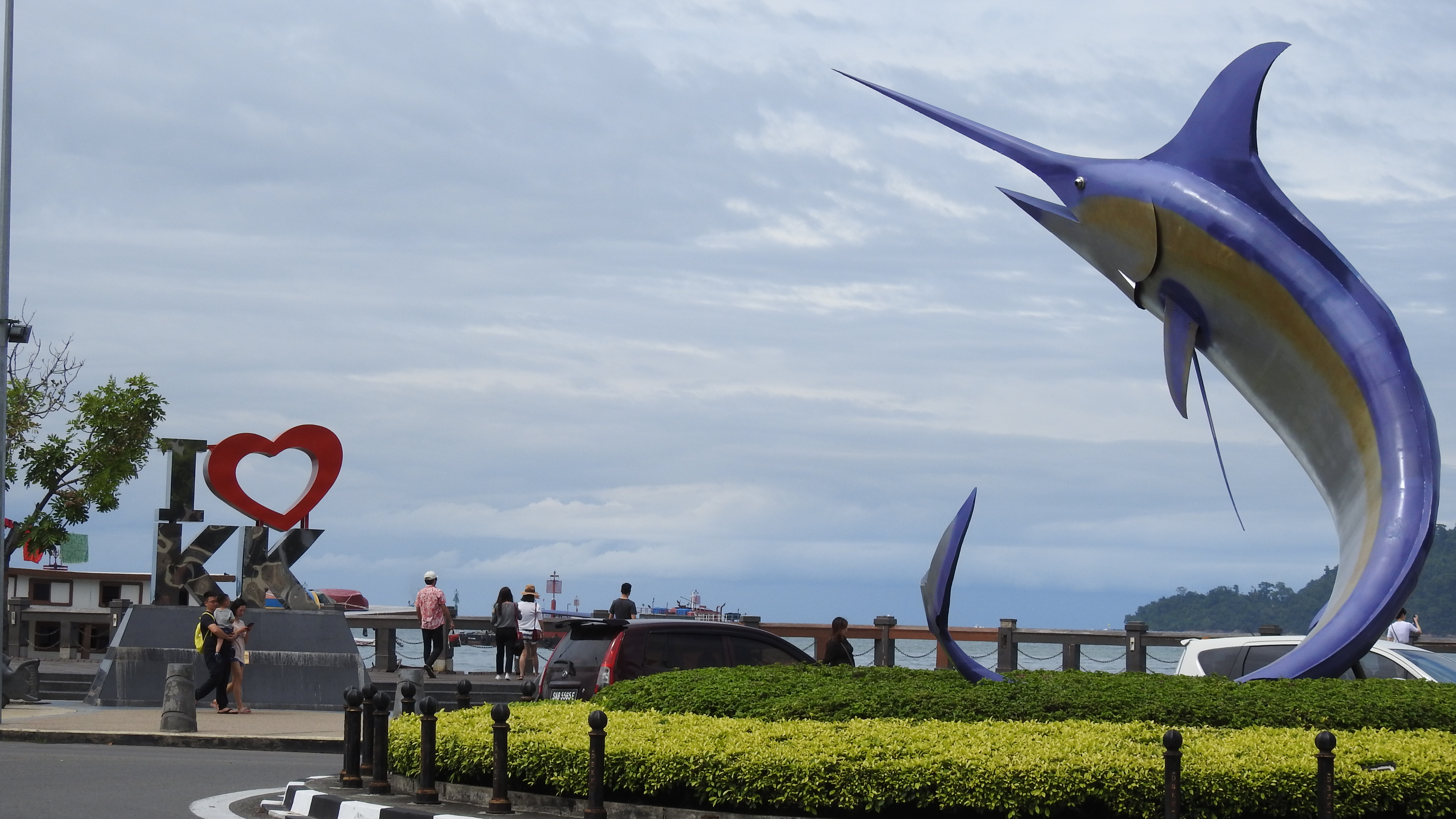
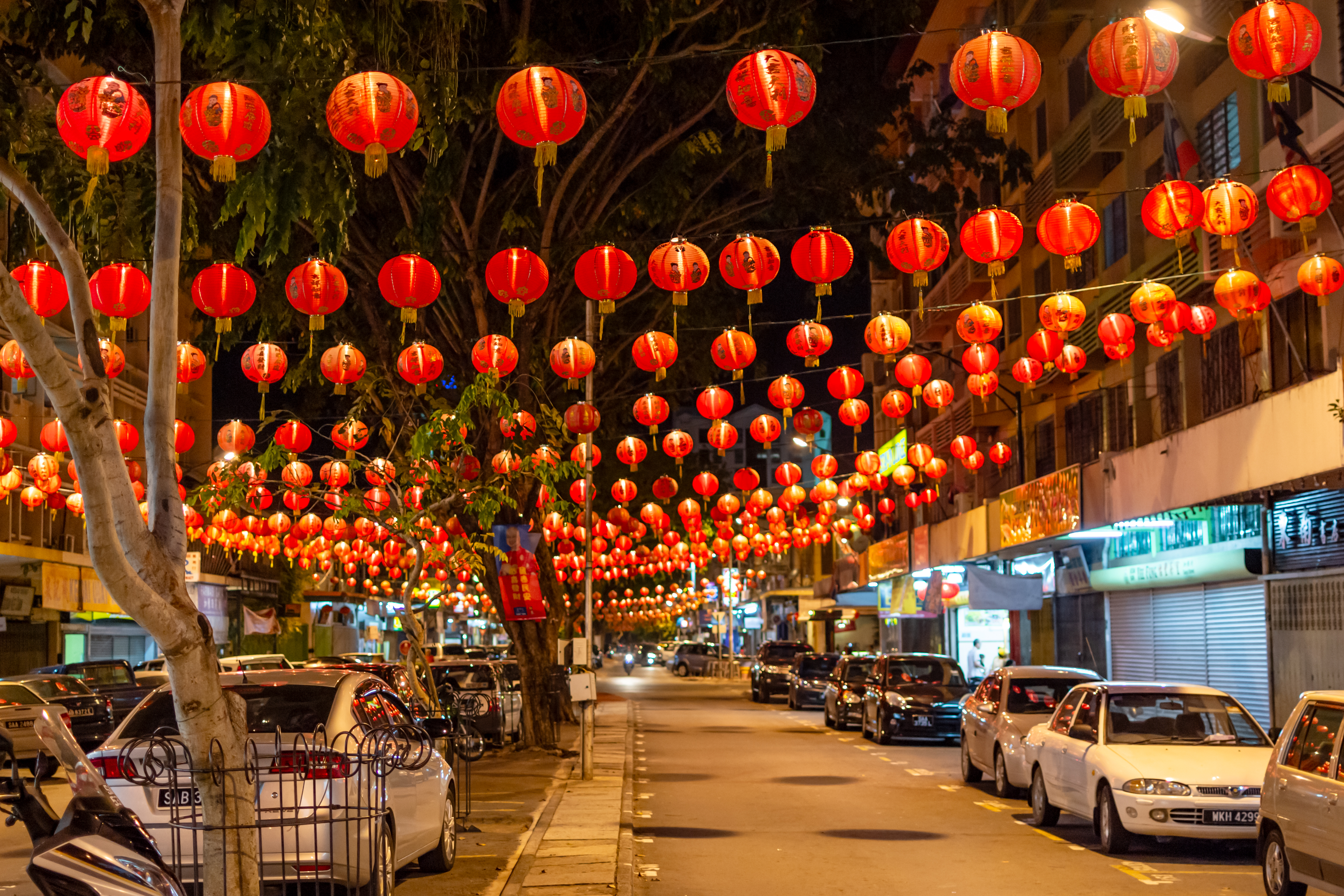
- Kota Kinabalu Skyline Wawasan Intersection Sabah Tower Kota Kinabalu Coastal Highway The Kota Kinabalu City Mosque The Wisma Tun Fuad Stephens building Marlin Gaya Street during Chinese New Year.

- Flag Seal
- Nicknames: KK, Nature Resort City
- Interactive map of Kota Kinabalu
- Kota Kinabalu in Sabah Kota Kinabalu (Malaysia) Kota Kinabalu (Southeast Asia) Kota Kinabalu (Asia)
- Coordinates: 05°58′30″N 116°04′21″E
- Country: Malaysia
- State: Sabah
- Division: West Coast
- District: Kota Kinabalu
- Bruneian Empire: 15th–18th century
- Settled and established by NBCC: 1899
- Declared as capital: 1946
- Municipality status: 1 January 1979
- City status: 2 February 2000

Government
  - Type: City council
  - Body: Kota Kinabalu City Hall
  - Mayor: Sabin Samitah (since 1 January 2024)
  - MP: Wilfred Madius Tangau (UPKO) (Tuaran) (since 5 May 2013); Mustapha Sakmud (PKR) (Sepanggar) (since 19 November 2022); Chan Foong Hin (DAP) (Kota Kinabalu) (since 9 May 2018); Shahelmey Yahya (UMNO) (Putatan) (since 19 November 2022); Ewon Benedick (UPKO) (Penampang) (since 19 November 2022)

Area
  - State capital city and district capital: 351 km^{2} (136 sq mi)
  - Urban: 816 km^{2} (315 sq mi)
  - Metro: 3,277 km^{2} (1,265 sq mi)
- Elevation: 5 m (16 ft)

Population (2024)
  - State capital city and district capital: 601,000
  - Density: 1,710/km^{2} (4,430/sq mi)
  - Metro: 731,406
  - Demonym: Orang KK / K.K-ites / K.K-ians
- Time zone: UTC+8 (MST)
- Postal code: 88xxx; 89xxx
- Area code(s): 088, 087
- Vehicle registration: EJ, EJA, EJB (1967–1980); SA/SAA/SAB/SAC (1980–2018); SY (2018-2023); SJ (2023–present)
- Website: dbkk.sabah.gov.my

Kota Kinabalu (Malaysian: [ˈkota kinaˈbalu]; previously Jesselton), colloquially referred to as KK, is the state capital of Sabah, Malaysia. It is also the capital of the Kota Kinabalu District as well as the West Coast Division of Sabah. The city is located on the northwest coast of Borneo facing the South China Sea. The Tunku Abdul Rahman National Park lies to its west and Mount Kinabalu, which gave the city its name, is located to its east. Kota Kinabalu has a population of 452,058 according to the 2010 census; when the adjacent Penampang and Tuaran districts are included, the metro area has a combined population of 628,725. The 2020 Census revealed an increase in the municipal population to 500,421, while the wider area including the Penampang and Putatan districts had a population of 731,406.

Historically, the Kadazandusuns called the area by the name of Dondoung. In the 15th century, the area was under the influence of Bruneian Empire. In the 19th century, the British North Borneo Chartered Company (NBCC) first set up a settlement near the Gaya Island. However, it was destroyed by fire in 1897 by a local rebel leader named Mat Salleh. In July 1899, the place located opposite to the Gaya Island was identified as a suitable place for settlements. Development in the area was started soon after that; and the place was named "Api-api" before it was renamed after Sir Charles Jessel, the vice-chairman of NBCC, as Jesselton. Jesselton became a major trading port in the area, and was connected to the North Borneo Railway. Jesselton was largely destroyed during World War II. The Japanese occupation of Jesselton provoked several local uprisings, notably the Jesselton Revolt, but they were eventually defeated by the Japanese. After the war, NBCC was unable to finance the high cost of reconstructions and the place was ceded to the British Crown Colony. The British Crown declared Jesselton as the new capital of North Borneo in 1946 and started to rebuild the town. After the formation of Malaysia, North Borneo was renamed as Sabah. In 1967, Jesselton was renamed as Kota Kinabalu, Kota being the Malay word for City and Kinabalu after the nearby Mount Kinabalu. Kota Kinabalu was granted city status in 2000.

Kota Kinabalu is often known as KK both in Malaysia and internationally. It is a major tourist destination and a gateway for travellers visiting Sabah and Borneo. Kinabalu Park is located about 90 kilometres from the city and there are many other tourist attractions in and around the city. Kota Kinabalu is also one of the major industrial and commercial centres of East Malaysia. These two factors combine to make Kota Kinabalu one of the fastest-growing cities in Malaysia.

== Etymology ==
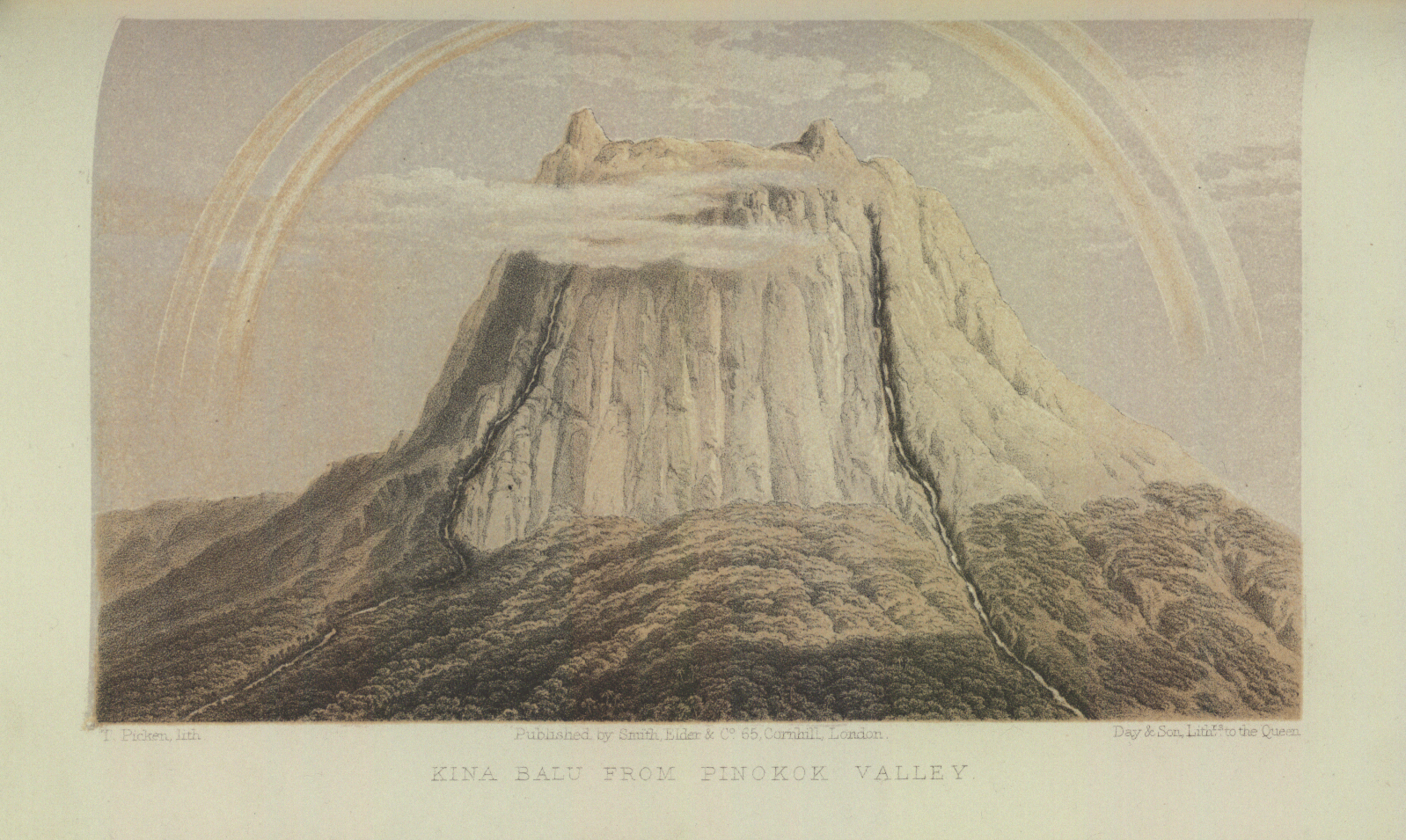
"Kina Balu from Pinokok Valley" – lithograph published in 1862.

Kota Kinabalu is named after Mount Kinabalu, which is situated about 50 kilometres east-northeast of the city. Kinabalu is derived from the name Aki Nabalu meaning the 'revered place of the dead'. Aki means 'ancestors' or 'grandfather', and Nabalu is a name for the mountain in the Dusun language. There is also a source claiming that the term originated from Ki Nabalu, Ki meaning 'have' or 'exist', and Nabalu meaning 'spirit of the dead'.

The word kota comes from Malay word kota which in turn comes from the Sanskrit word कोट्ट (kota) which means 'fort, fortress, castle, fortified house, fortification, works, city, town, or place encircled by walls'. It is also used formally in a few other Malaysian towns and cities, for example, Kota Bharu, Kota Tinggi, and Kota Kemuning. It can also be used informally to refer to any towns or cities. Hence, a direct translation of the name Kota Kinabalu into English would be "City of Kinabalu" or "Kinabalu City".

=== Original names ===
Besides Jesselton, there are also other older names for Kota Kinabalu. The most popular is Api-Api, or simply Api, which is a Malay word meaning 'fire'. Wendy Law Suart wrote in her book on North Borneo, The Lingering Eye, "there is in the Sabah State Museum a Dutch map of Borneo and the Celebes dated 1657 in which the settlement where Jesselton was to stand is clearly labelled Api Api. It may have some connection with the seaside tree with breathing roots that bears the same name". There are claims, however, that Kota Kinabalu was actually named after a nearby river called Sungai Api-Api. In Chinese, the city is still known as Api, which is the Hakka pronunciation for 亚庇 (Simplified Chinese; Traditional Chinese: 亞庇; pinyin: yà bì).

Another suggested historical name is Deasoka, which roughly means 'below the coconut tree' in the Bajau language. The Bajau locals purportedly used this name to refer to a village in the southern part of the city which was filled with coconut trees. Yet another name was Singgah Mata which literally means 'transit eye', but can be loosely translated as 'pleasing to the eye'. It is a name said to have been given by fishermen from Gaya Island referring to the strip of land that is today's downtown Kota Kinabalu. Today, all these names have been immortalised as names of streets or buildings around the city. Some examples are Lintasan Deasoka, Api-Api Centre and Singgah Mata Street.

== History ==
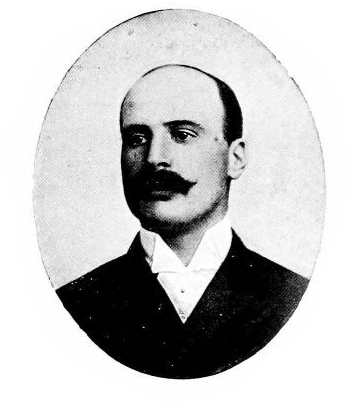
Sir Charles Jessel, vice-chairman of the NBCC, after whom Jesselton (now Kota Kinabalu) was named.

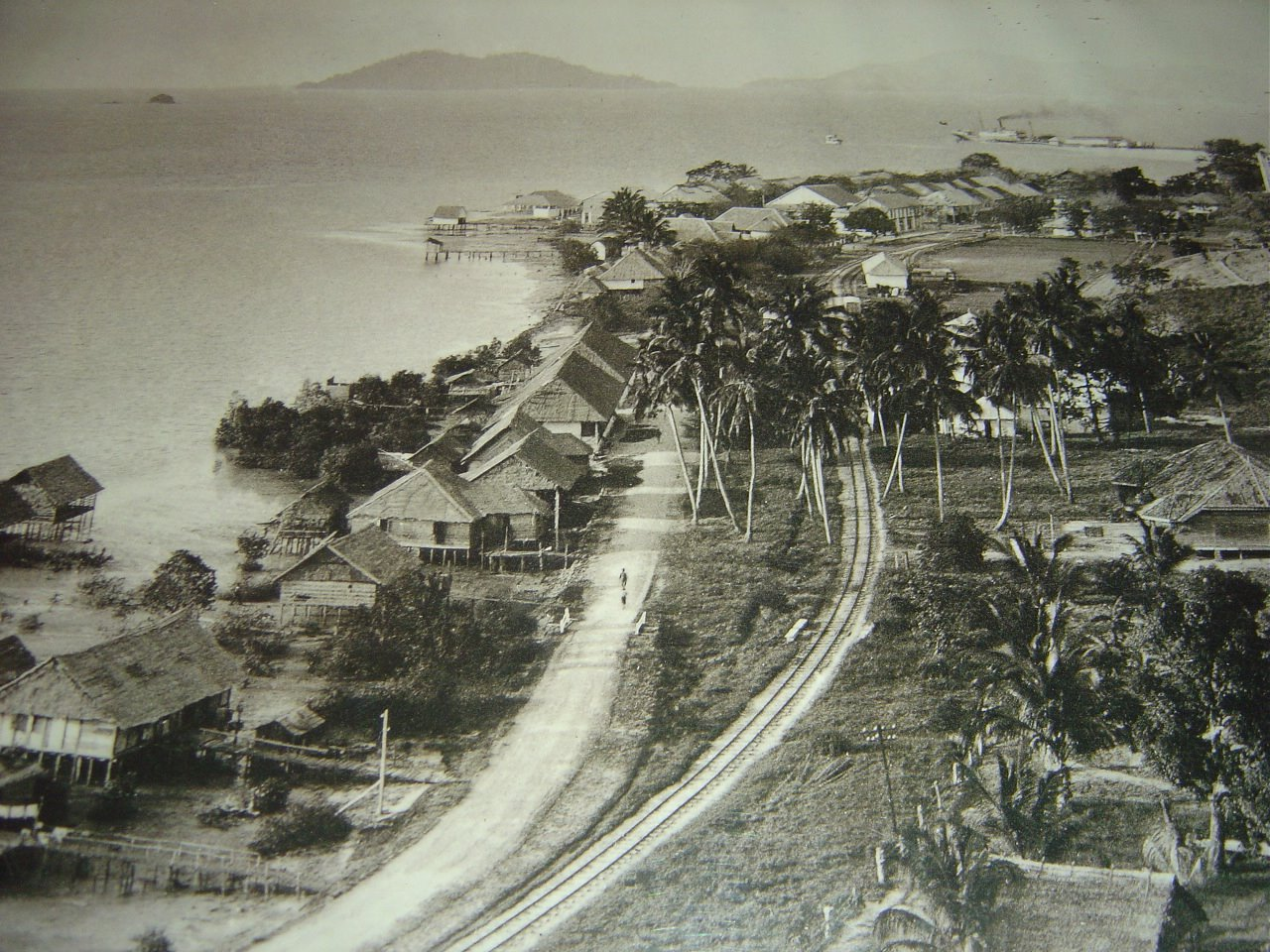
Jesselton, c. 1911.

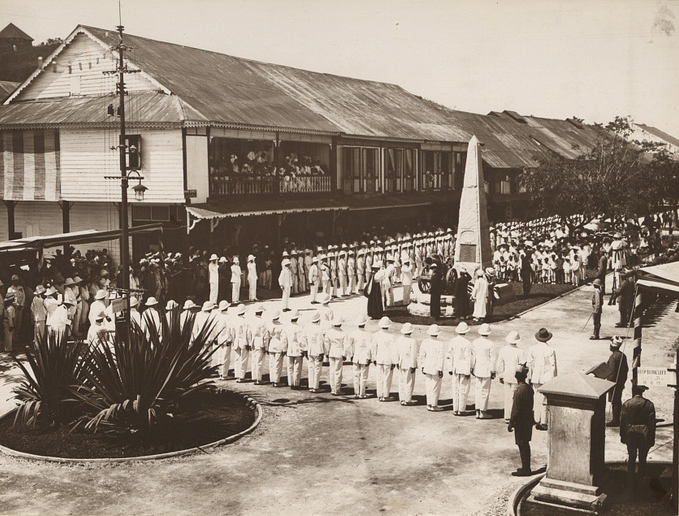
The North Borneo War Monument was erected in Jesselton in 1923 to remember those fallen British soldiers during World War I.

Since the 15th century, the area of what is now Kota Kinabalu came under the influence of the Bruneian Empire. In the late 1800s, the British North Borneo Chartered Company (NBCC) began to establish colonial settlements throughout North Borneo. In 1882, NBCC founded a small settlement in the area known as Gaya Bay, which was already inhabited by the Bajau people. The first settlement was at Gaya Island. However, in 1897, the settlement was burned and destroyed by the indigenous Bajau-Suluk chief Mat Salleh.

After the destruction, NBCC decided to relocate the settlement to the more easily defended mainland at Gantian Bay (now Sepanggar Bay) in 1898. However, Gantian Bay was found to be unsuitable and in July 1899, Henry Walker, a Land Commissioner, identified a 30 acres (12 ha) site opposite Gaya Island as a replacement for Gantian Bay. The replacement settlement site was a fishing village called Api-Api (see Original names above). The site was chosen due to its proximity to the North Borneo Railway and its natural port that provided good anchorage, which was up to 24 feet deep.

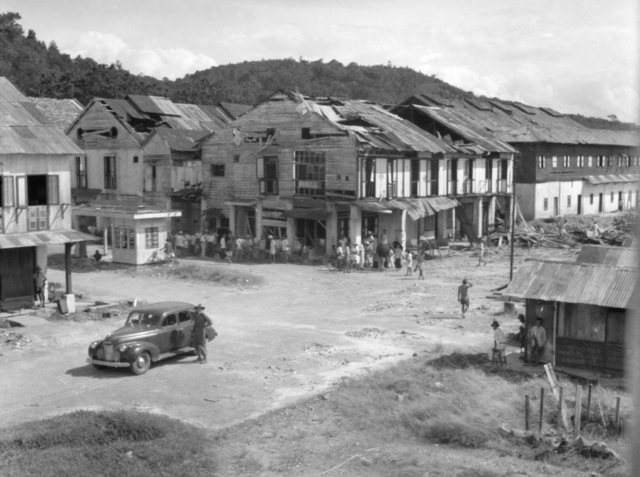
Bomb damage at the town of Jesselton during World War II, this was part of the Borneo Campaign by Allied forces during 1945.

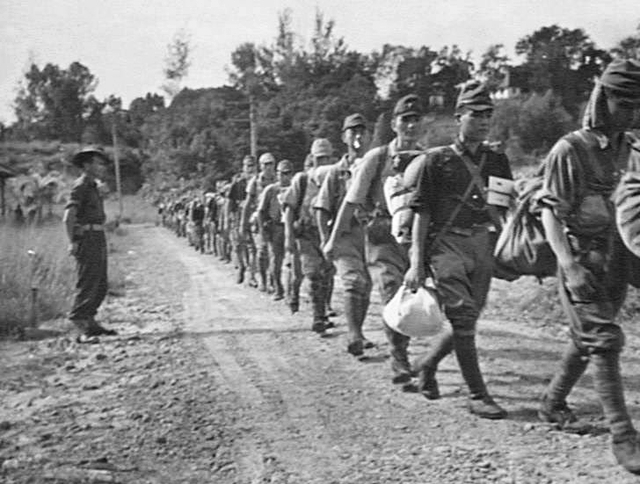
Disarmed Japanese troops marching towards a prisoner of war (POW) compound in Jesselton after surrendering to the Australian Imperial Force (AIF) on 8 October 1945.

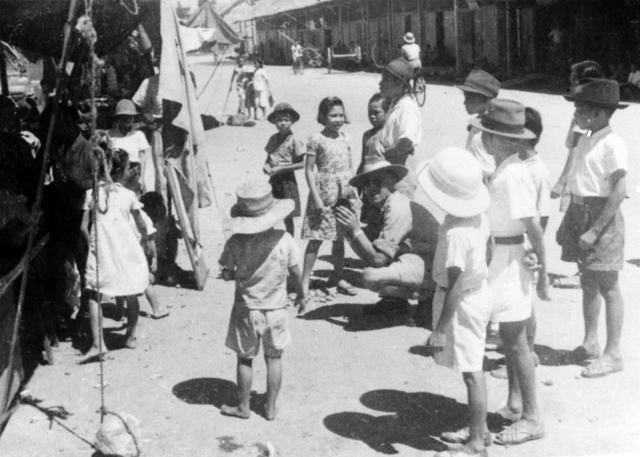
Children in Jesselton filmed by Australian government representative a year after the war in 1946.

By the end of 1899, construction had started on shoplots, a pier and government buildings. This new administrative centre was renamed Jesselton after Sir Charles Jessel, who was the then Vice-Chairman of NBCC. Eventually, Jesselton became a major trading post of North Borneo, dealing in rubber, rattan, honey, and wax. The North Borneo Railway was used to transport goods to the Jesselton harbour. The Malay and Bajau uprisings during those times were not uncommon, and NBCC worked to quell the long-standing threat of piracy in the region. Jesselton was partially razed by the British during their retreat from the advancing Japanese and suffered further devastation when the Allies bombed it in 1945. After the Japanese takeover of Borneo, it was again renamed Api. Several rebellions against the Japanese military administration took place in Api. One major rebellion in the town occurred on 10 October 1943 by a group called Kinabalu Guerrillas in the Jesselton Revolt consisting of local inhabitants. Japanese forces quelled the rebellion after its leader, Albert Kwok, was arrested and executed in 1944. At the later stages of the war, what remained of the town was destroyed again by Allied bombings day and night for over six months as part of the Borneo Campaign in 1945, leaving only three buildings standing. The war in North Borneo ended with the official surrender of the Japanese 37th Army by Lieutenant General Baba Masao in Labuan on 10 September 1945.

After the war on the edge of bankruptcy, the British North Borneo Company returned to administer Jesselton but was unable to finance the huge costs of reconstruction. They gave control of North Borneo to the British Crown on 18 July 1946. The new colonial government elected to rebuild Jesselton as the capital of North Borneo instead of Sandakan, which had also been destroyed by the war. The Crown Colony administration designed a plan, later known as the "Colonial Office Reconstruction and Development Plan for North Borneo: 1948–1955", to rebuild North Borneo. This plan provided £6,051,939 for the rebuilding of infrastructure in North Borneo. When the Crown Colony of North Borneo together with Sarawak, Singapore and the Federation of Malaya formed the Federation of Malaysia in 1963, it became known as Sabah, and Jesselton remained its capital. On 22 December 1967, the State Legislative Assembly under Chief Minister Mustapha Harun passed a bill renaming Jesselton as Kota Kinabalu. Kota Kinabalu town board was upgraded to municipal status in 1979. The city was upgraded to city status on 2 February 2000.

== Capital city ==
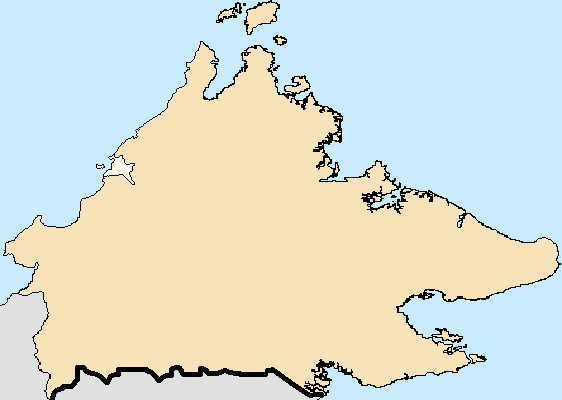
Locations of Kota Kinabalu and its suburbs

Being the capital city of Sabah, Kota Kinabalu plays an important role in the political and economic welfare of the population of the entire state. It is the seat of the state government where almost all of their ministries and agencies are based. Most of the Malaysian federal government agencies and departments are also located in Kota Kinabalu. The Sabah State Legislative Assembly is located at the nearby Likas Bay. There are four members of parliament (MPs) representing the four parliamentary constituencies in the city: Sepanggar (P.171), Kota Kinabalu (P.172), Putatan (P.173), Tuaran ("P.176") and Penampang (P.174). The city also elects 9 representatives to the state legislature from the state assembly districts of Karambunai, Inanam, Likas, Api-Api, Luyang, Tanjung Aru, Petagas, Kepayan, Segama, Menggatal, Tuaran, Lido, and Moyog.

=== Local authority and city definition ===
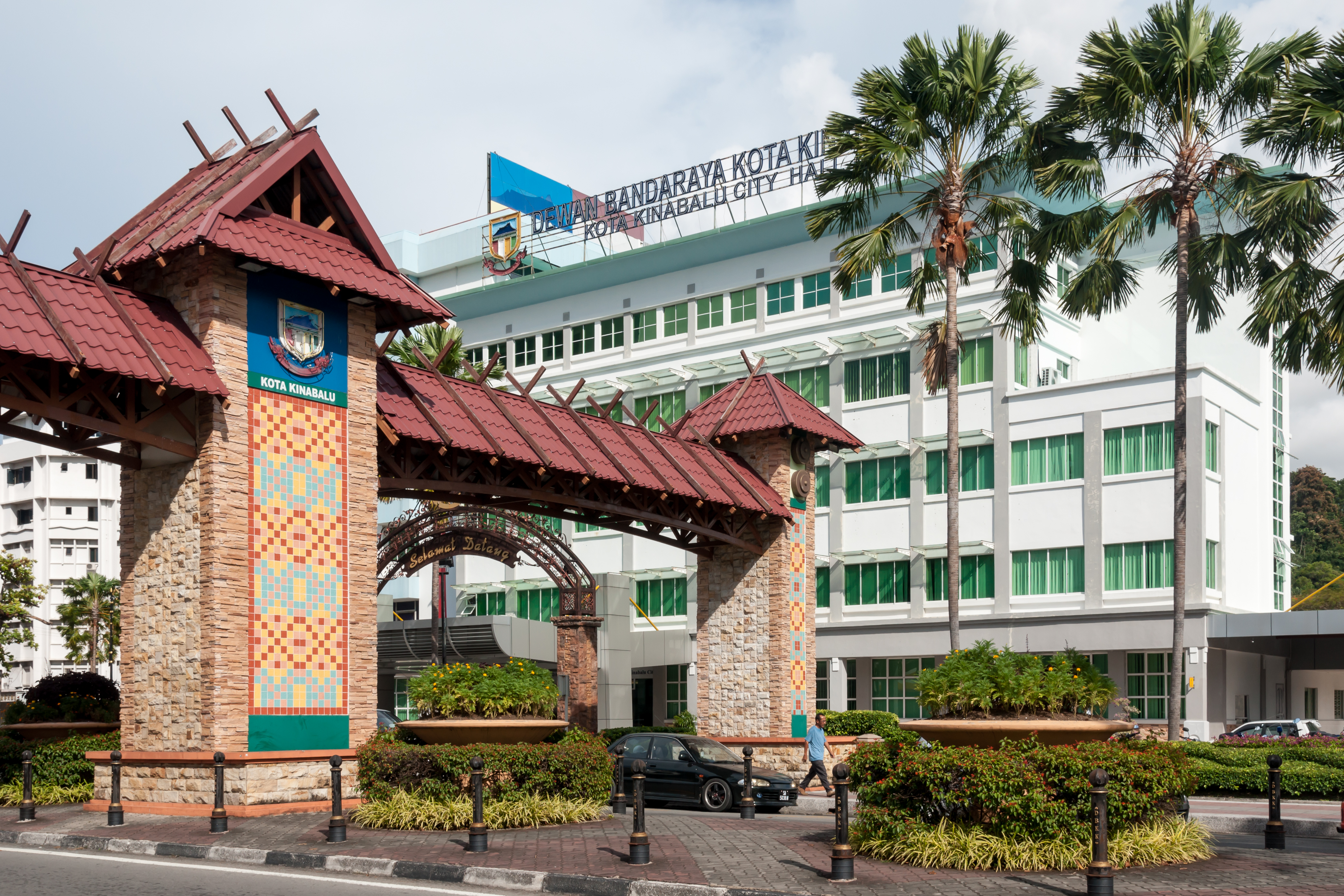
Kota Kinabalu City Hall.

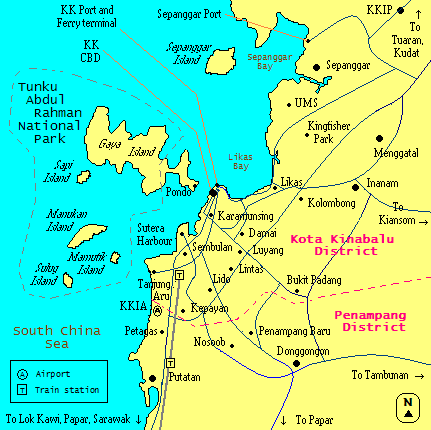
A rough map of Kota Kinabalu city and urban area. Blue lines indicate main roads, grey lines indicate railway lines, and pink dotted lines indicate district boundaries.

The city is administered by the Kota Kinabalu City Hall (Dewan Bandaraya Kota Kinabalu). The current mayor of Kota Kinabalu is Sabin Samitah, who became the latest mayor after taking over the post from Noorliza Awang Alip on 1 January 2024. Iliyas in turn became the second mayor of the city after taking over from Abdul Ghani Rashid in 2006. The city obtained city status on 2 February 2000, and prior to this it was administered by Majlis Perbandaran Kota Kinabalu (Kota Kinabalu Municipal Council/Kota Kinabalu Town Hall).

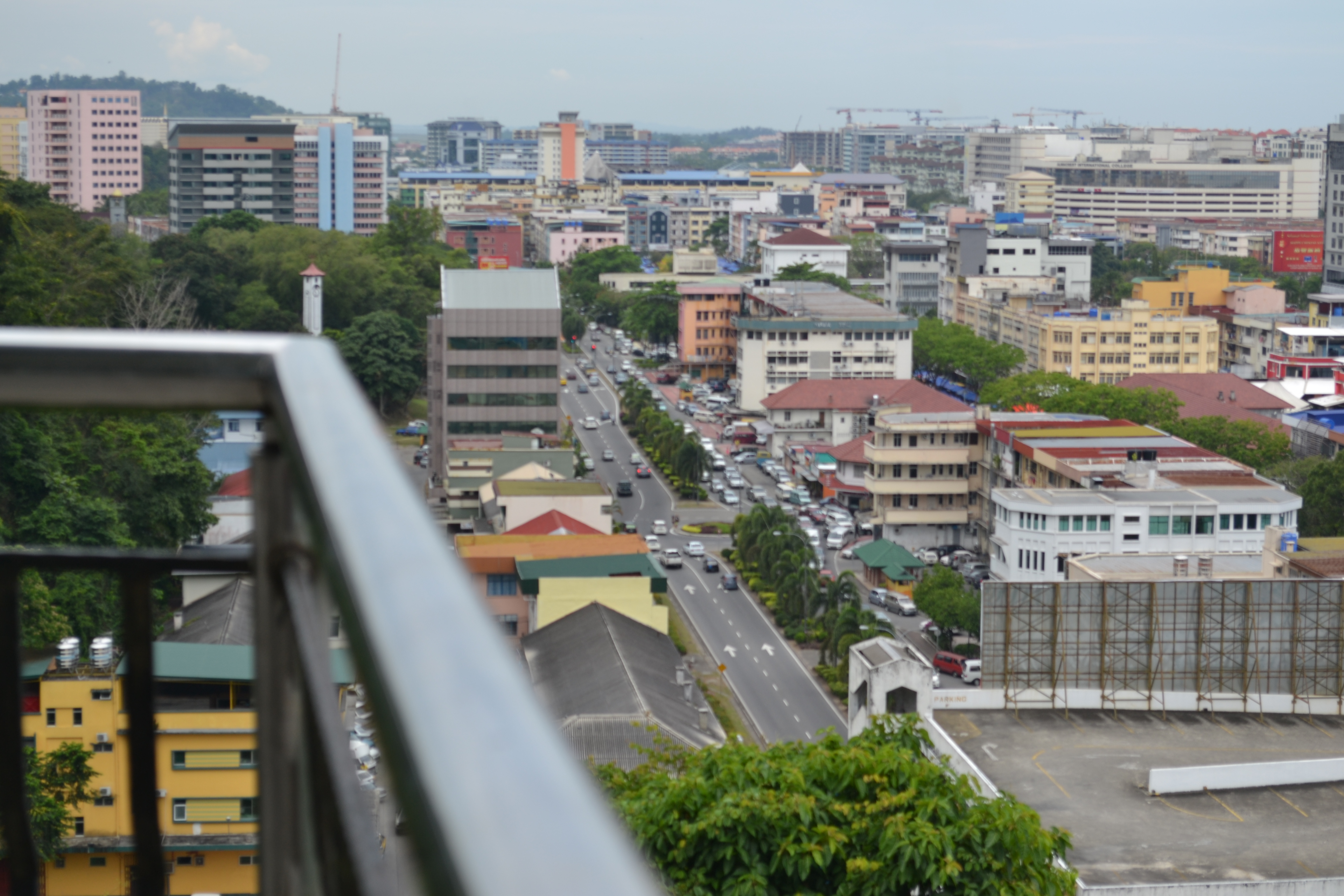
View over the southern city central business district.

The city is defined within the borders of what is the district, formerly the municipality, of Kota Kinabalu. With an area of 351 square kilometres, it is the smallest but the most populous district in Sabah. It encompasses Tanjung Aru and Kepayan in the south, up to Telipok and Sepanggar in the north. The urban expanse of the city however extends into the district of Penampang on the south of the city border, which includes the towns of Donggongon and Putatan. The combined area of Kota Kinabalu District and the contiguous built up areas in Penampang and Putatan is known as Greater Kota Kinabalu. The district of Penampang has an area of 466 square kilometres, and is administered by Majlis Daerah Penampang (Penampang District Council).

On one end of the scale, Kota Kinabalu may sometimes only refer to, especially by local inhabitants, the city centre or central business district near the sea facing Gaya Island. On the other end of the scale, it may also refer to the metropolitan area which includes urban Kota Kinabalu (Greater Kota Kinabalu), and the surrounding towns of Papar and Kinarut in the south, and Tuaran and Tamparuli in the north, being within its zone of influence.

== Geography ==
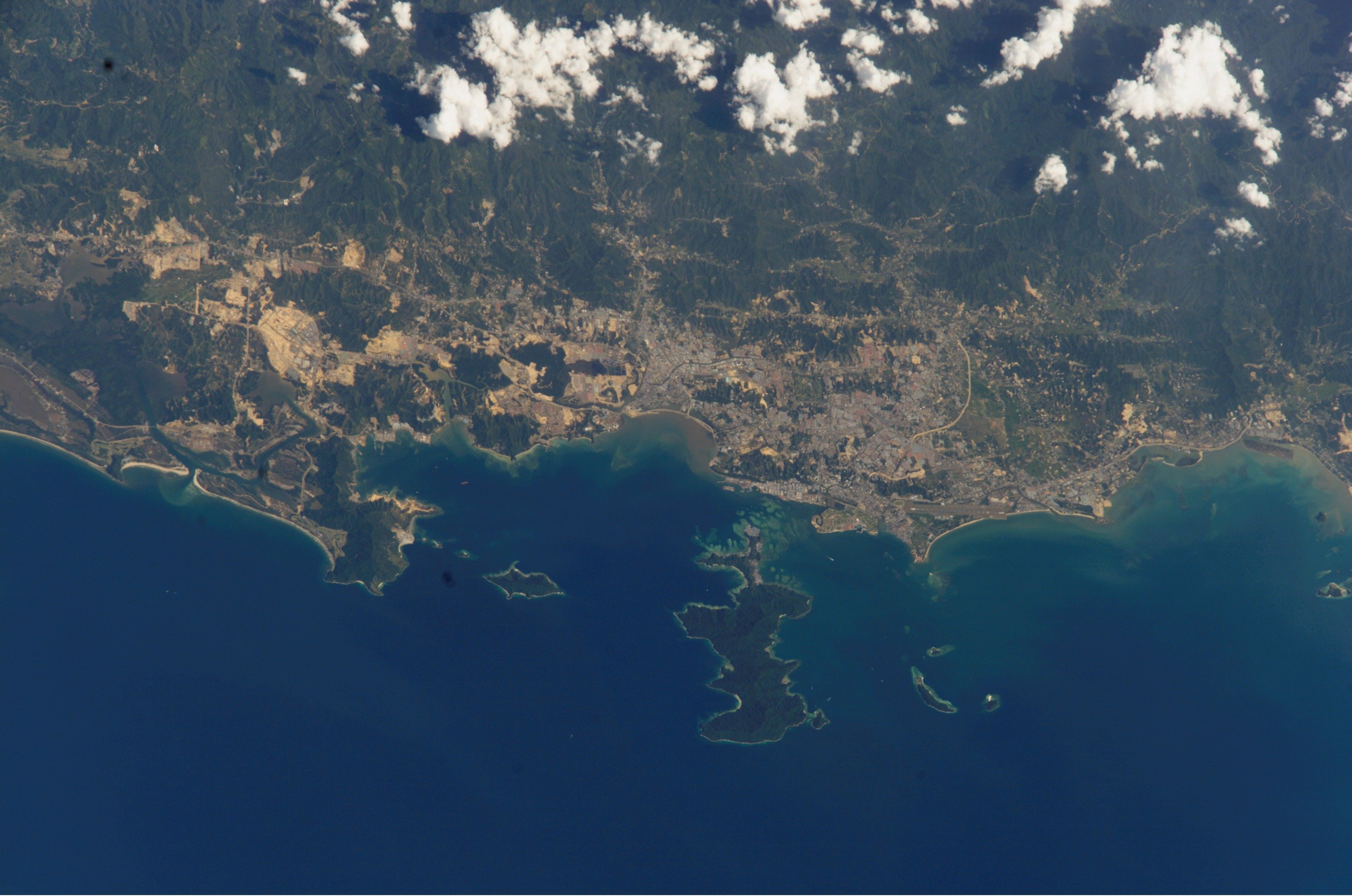
View of Kota Kinabalu captured from the International Space Station in 2002.

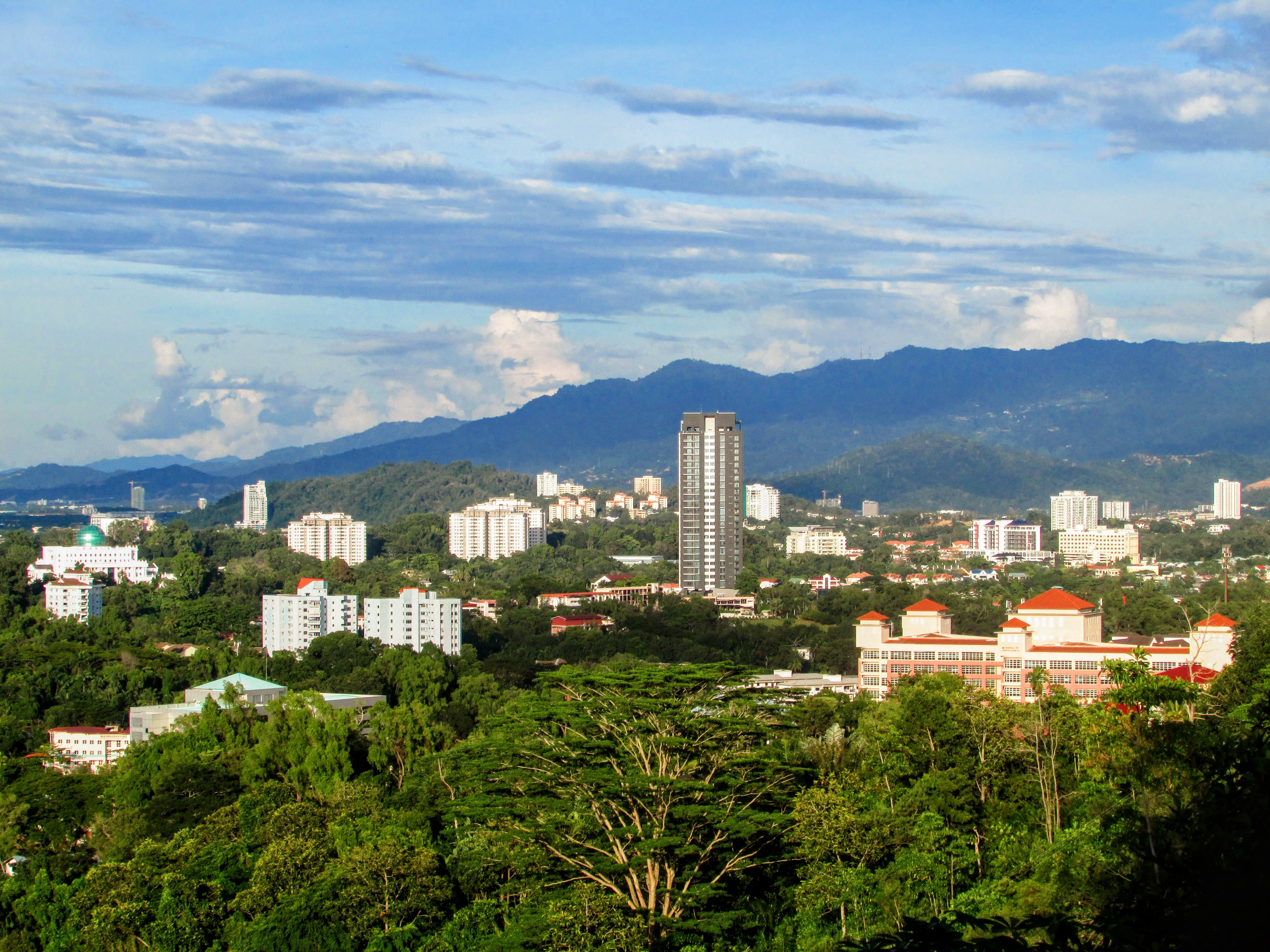
View of Greater Kota Kinabalu with skyscrapers dotting the city above lush green treetops.

Kota Kinabalu is located on the west coast of Sabah. The city lies on a narrow flatland between the Crocker Range to the east and the South China Sea to the west. There are six islands off the coast of the city. The largest is Gaya Island, the site of the first British settlement. Approximately 8,000 people live there. The smaller islands, mainly uninhabited, are named Sapi Island, Manukan Island, Sulug Island, Mamutik Island and Sepanggar Island to the north. Sepanggar island is located north of the National Park opposite Sepanggar Bay.

Flat land is at a premium in the city centre, and there is a strict limit to the height of buildings: the airport is 7 km (4 mi) away, and the city is directly in the flight path. Most of the Central Business District (CBD) today is built on land reclaimed from the sea. The original local plant life has largely disappeared, but several hills within the city (too steep for building) are still clothed with tropical rainforest. One of these is Signal Hill, which confines the CBD to the shore. In the area of Likas Bay, the remnants of an extensive mangrove forest was nearly lost. In 1996, the state government declared 24 acres (9.7 ha) of the forest as a protected area. This forest is now known as the Kota Kinabalu City Bird Sanctuary. The sanctuary was given additional protection as a State Cultural Heritage Site in 1998.

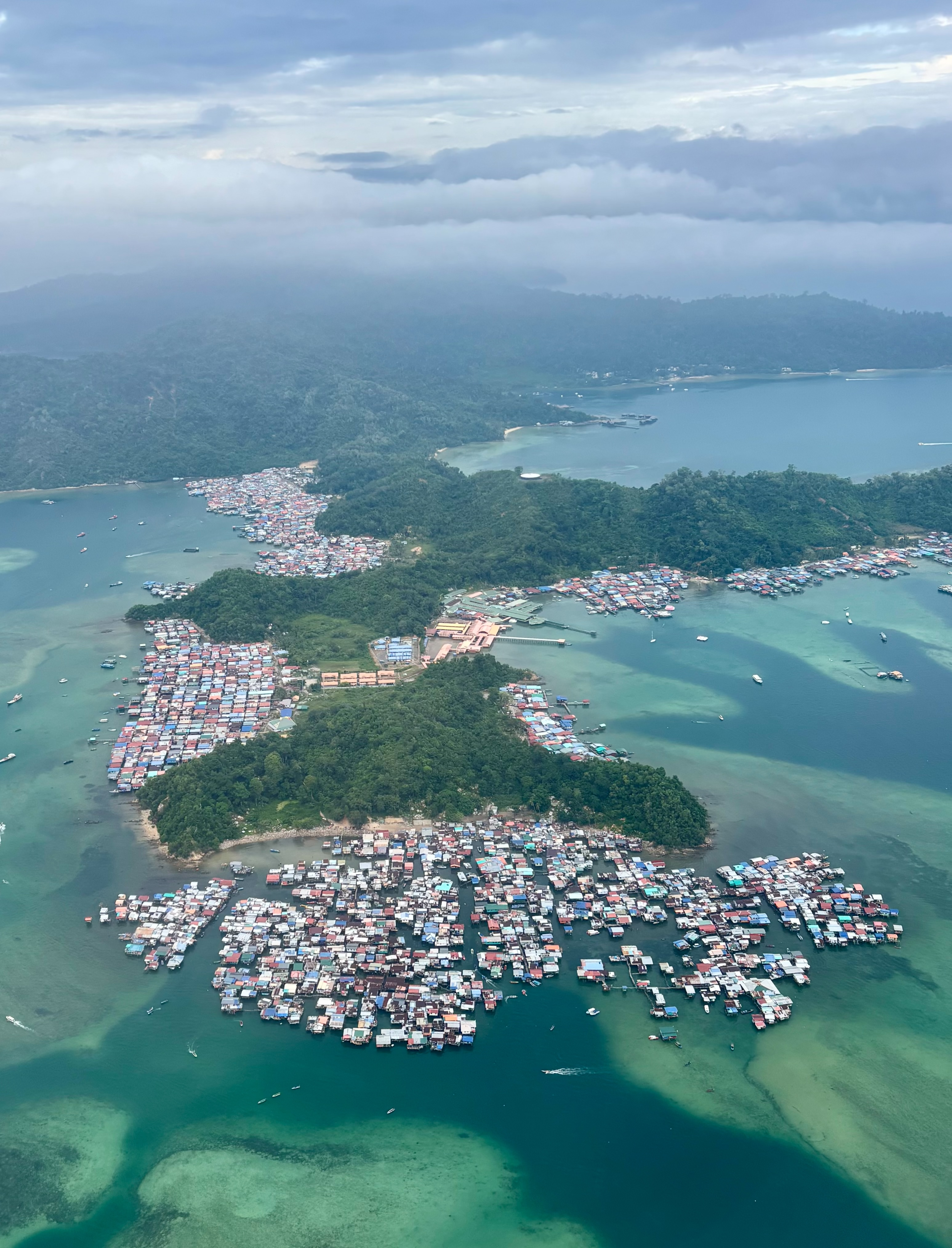
Aerial view of Gaya island in 2026.

The five islands (of Gaya, Sapi, Manukan, Sulug, Mamutik) opposite the city, and their surrounding waters, are also preserved as the Tunku Abdul Rahman National Park. The park was named in honour of the first Prime Minister of Malaysia, Tunku Abdul Rahman. The park is a recreational spot for tourists and local people. The Kota Kinabalu city centre, consisting of mostly businesses and the government, includes Karamunsing, the port area (Tanjung Lipat), Signal Hill, Kampung Air, Sinsuran, Segama, Asia City, Gaya Street (Old Town), Bandaran Berjaya, Api-Api, Sutera Harbour and Sembulan. Outlying neighbourhoods and residential suburbs include Kepayan Ridge, Tanjung Aru, Petagas, Kepayan, Lido, Lintas, Nosoob, Bukit Padang, Luyang, Damai, Lok Kawi, Bukit Bendera, Kasigui, Bundusan, Likas and Kolombong. The city is growing steadily and the urban sprawl extends to the towns of Inanam, Menggatal, Sepanggar, Telipok and south of the district border to Penampang, Putatan, and Lok Kawi. Kota Kinabalu is generally isolated from the rest of the country; it is located about 1,624 kilometres (1,009 mi) from Kuala Lumpur in Peninsular Malaysia and 804 kilometres (500 mi) from Kuching in the neighbouring state of Sarawak.

=== Climate ===
Kota Kinabalu features a tropical rainforest climate (Af) with constant high temperatures, and a considerable amount of rain and high humidity throughout the course of the year. Two prevailing monsoons characterise the climate of this part of Sabah are the Northeast Monsoon and the Southwest Monsoon. The Northeast Monsoon occurs between November and March, while the Southwest Monsoon occurs between May and September. There are also two successive inter-monsoons from April to May and from September to October.

During the 1995–2004 period, Kota Kinabalu's average temperature ranges from 26 °C (79 °F) to 28 °C (82 °F). April and May are the hottest months, while January is the coolest one. The average annual rainfall is around 2,400 millimetres and varies markedly throughout the year. February and March are typically the driest months while rainfall peaks in the inter-monsoon period in October. The wind speed ranges from 5.5 to 7.9 m/s during the Northeast Monsoon but is significantly lower to 0.3 to 3.3 m/s during the Southwest Monsoon.

Climate data for Kota Kinabalu (1991–2020 normals, extremes 1946–2020)
Month	Jan	Feb	Mar	Apr	May	Jun	Jul	Aug	Sep	Oct	Nov	Dec	Year
Record high °C (°F)	35.0 (95.0)	35.2 (95.4)	35.7 (96.3)	36.0 (96.8)	36.5 (97.7)	36.3 (97.3)	35.9 (96.6)	36.4 (97.5)	36.1 (97.0)	34.8 (94.6)	34.8 (94.6)	34.2 (93.6)	36.5 (97.7)
Mean daily maximum °C (°F)	31.3 (88.3)	31.4 (88.5)	32.1 (89.8)	33.0 (91.4)	33.1 (91.6)	32.6 (90.7)	32.3 (90.1)	32.4 (90.3)	32.2 (90.0)	31.8 (89.2)	31.9 (89.4)	31.7 (89.1)	32.1 (89.8)
Daily mean °C (°F)	26.9 (80.4)	26.9 (80.4)	27.5 (81.5)	28.1 (82.6)	28.2 (82.8)	27.9 (82.2)	27.6 (81.7)	27.7 (81.9)	27.5 (81.5)	27.2 (81.0)	27.2 (81.0)	27.1 (80.8)	27.5 (81.5)
Mean daily minimum °C (°F)	23.5 (74.3)	23.6 (74.5)	23.9 (75.0)	24.5 (76.1)	24.7 (76.5)	24.4 (75.9)	24.1 (75.4)	24.1 (75.4)	24.0 (75.2)	24.0 (75.2)	24.0 (75.2)	23.9 (75.0)	24.1 (75.4)
Record low °C (°F)	18.0 (64.4)	17.0 (62.6)	18.0 (64.4)	18.0 (64.4)	18.0 (64.4)	18.0 (64.4)	17.0 (62.6)	16.0 (60.8)	17.0 (62.6)	19.0 (66.2)	18.0 (64.4)	18.0 (64.4)	16.0 (60.8)
Average precipitation mm (inches)	140.7 (5.54)	78.1 (3.07)	93.1 (3.67)	123.4 (4.86)	212.3 (8.36)	283.9 (11.18)	288.3 (11.35)	278.6 (10.97)	287.3 (11.31)	387.3 (15.25)	283.3 (11.15)	261.8 (10.31)	2,718.1 (107.01)
Average precipitation days (≥ 1.0 mm)	9.2	6.6	7.0	9.4	12.2	12.8	14.0	14.0	14.3	18.0	15.8	14.1	147.4
Average relative humidity (%)	83	82	81	80	81	80	79	78	81	82	83	83	81
Mean monthly sunshine hours	187.7	194.8	233.4	245.3	228.8	197.6	204.9	196.7	180.7	191.9	192.5	197.5	2,451.8
Source 1: World Meteorological Organization
Source 2: NOAA (sun, 1961–1990), Deutscher Wetterdienst (extremes and humidity)

== Demography ==
There have not been any official or popular adjectives, or demonyms, to describe the people of Kota Kinabalu. A simple way to describe the people of the city is "orang KK", where orang means "person" or "people" in Malay. The terms "K.K-ites" and "K.K-ians" have also been used to a limited extent. People from Sabah are called Sabahans.

=== Ethnicity and religion ===
The following is based on Department of Statistics Malaysia 2010 census.

Ethnic groups in Kota Kinabalu, 2010
Ethnicity	Population	Percentage
Chinese	93,429	20.7%
Bajau	72,931	16.13%
Kadazan-Dusun	69,993	15.5%
Other Bumiputras	59,607	13.2%
Malay	35,835	7.9%
Murut	2,518	0.6%
Indian	2,207	0.5%
Others	5,482	1.21%
Non-Malaysian	110,556	24.5%

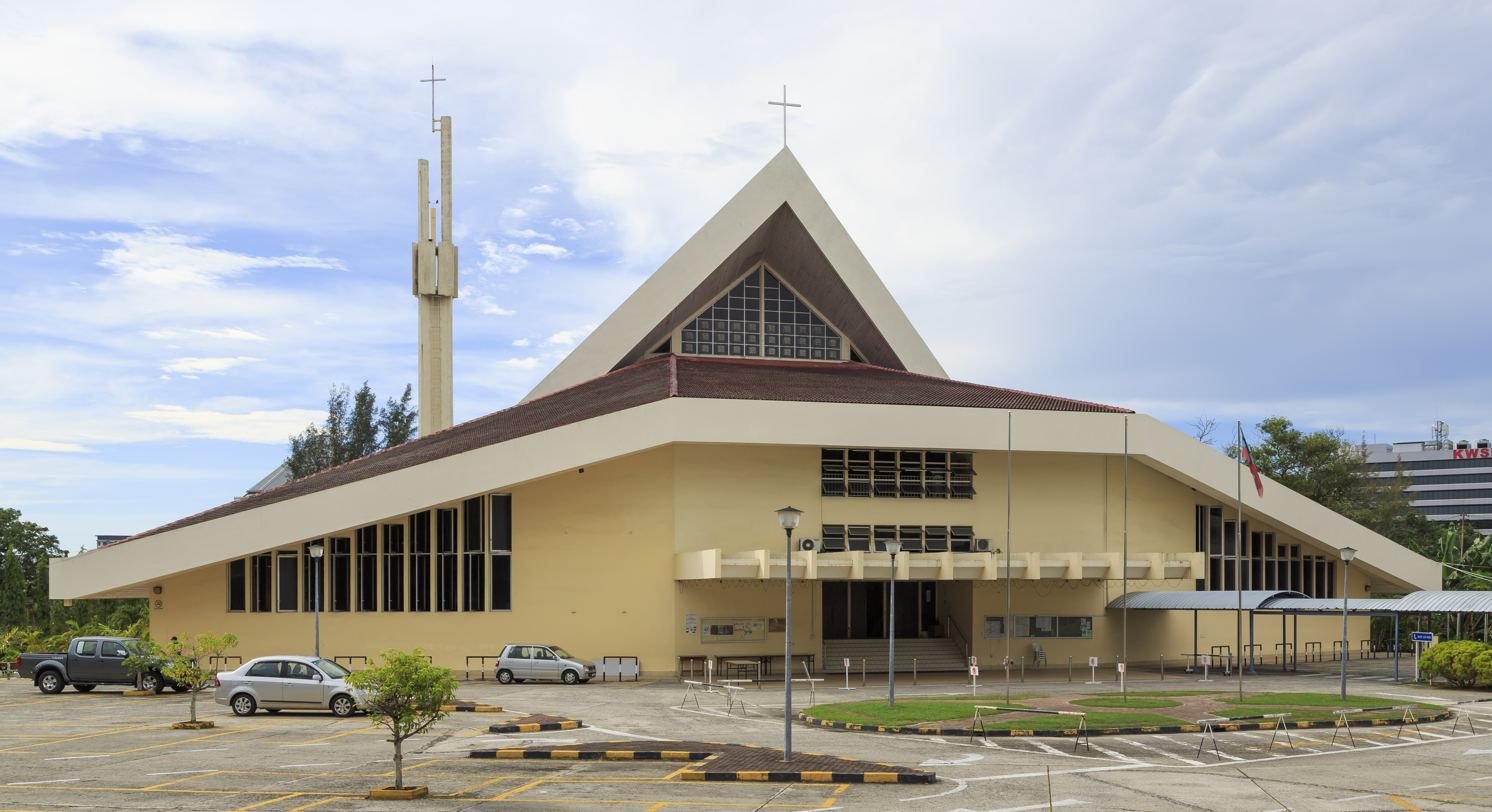
Sacred Heart Cathedral.

The Malaysian Census 2010 Report estimated the population of Kota Kinabalu at 452,058. The city's population is a mixture of many different races and ethnicities. Non-Malaysian citizens form the largest group in the city with 110,556 people followed by Chinese (93,429), Bajau (72,931), Kadazan-Dusun (69,993), other Bumiputras (59,107), Malay (35,835), Murut (2,518), Indian (2,207) and others (5,482).

The Chinese are mostly Hakkas and reside mainly in the Luyang area as well as in Likas and Damai neighbourhoods with significant populations in other suburbs such as Manggatal, Inanam and Telipok. There is also a sizeable Cantonese-speaking population and smaller communities of Hokkien and Fuzhounese-speaking Chinese scattered throughout all areas of the city. Most of the Fuzhounese speakers in particular emigrated to Sabah from the neighbouring Malaysian state of Sarawak.

Kota Kinabalu is home to a diverse range of indigenous groups. The Kadazans, who predominantly come from Penampang and Papar, and the Dusuns, from the west coast and the interior of Sabah, are among the largest groups. The Bajaus, originally from Tuaran and Kota Belud, also have a significant presence in the city, along with other Bajau communities from various coastal regions of Sabah. The Malay population in Kota Kinabalu is primarily descended from Bruneian Malays, with smaller communities from the Malay Peninsula and Sarawak. Additionally, there are several other indigenous groups, including the Murut, Suluk, Sungai, Lun Bawang/Lundayeh, Bisaya, Illanun, Kedayan, Ida'an and Rungus, who have relocated to the city for socio-economic opportunities from different parts of the state.

Penampang district is populated mainly by Kadazans, while Bajaus and Dusuns mainly reside in Likas, Sembulan, Inanam, Menggatal, Sepanggar and Telipok. In Tuaran, both Dusun and Bajau communities are prominent, while Papar is largely inhabited by Kadazans and Bruneian Malays.

The Brunei Malays and Bajau are Muslims. The Kadazan-Dusuns, Muruts, Rungus and Lundayeh/Lun Bawang mainly practice Folk forms of Christianity, Islam, or Animism, while the Chinese are mainly Buddhists, Taoist or Christians. There are numerous Roman Catholic, Basel (Lutheran), Anglican, Evangelical, and Methodist churches throughout the city. A small number of Hindus, Sikhs, Animists, and secularists can also be found. The Census 2020 Report showed an increase to 500,421 inhabitants.

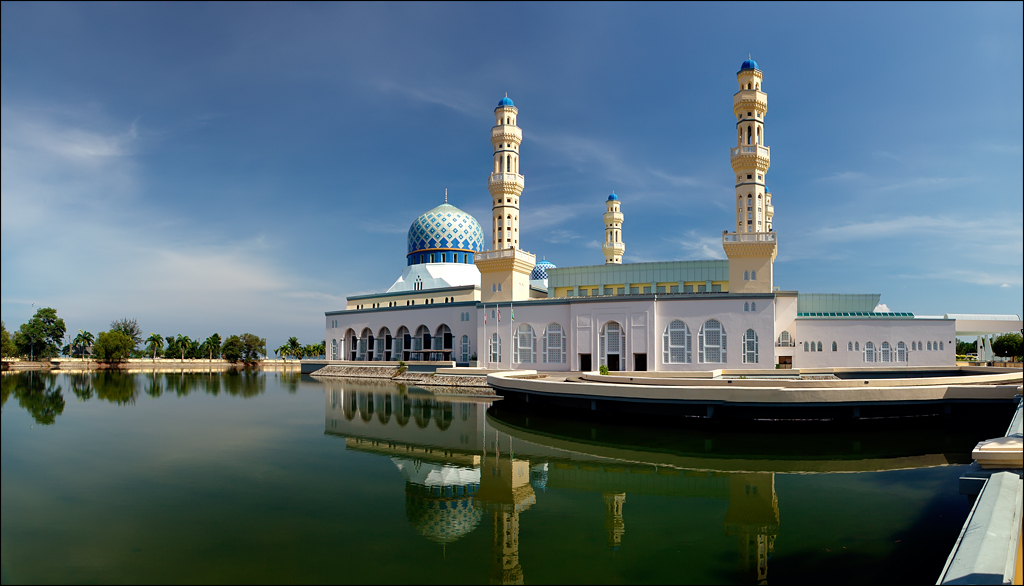
City Mosque.

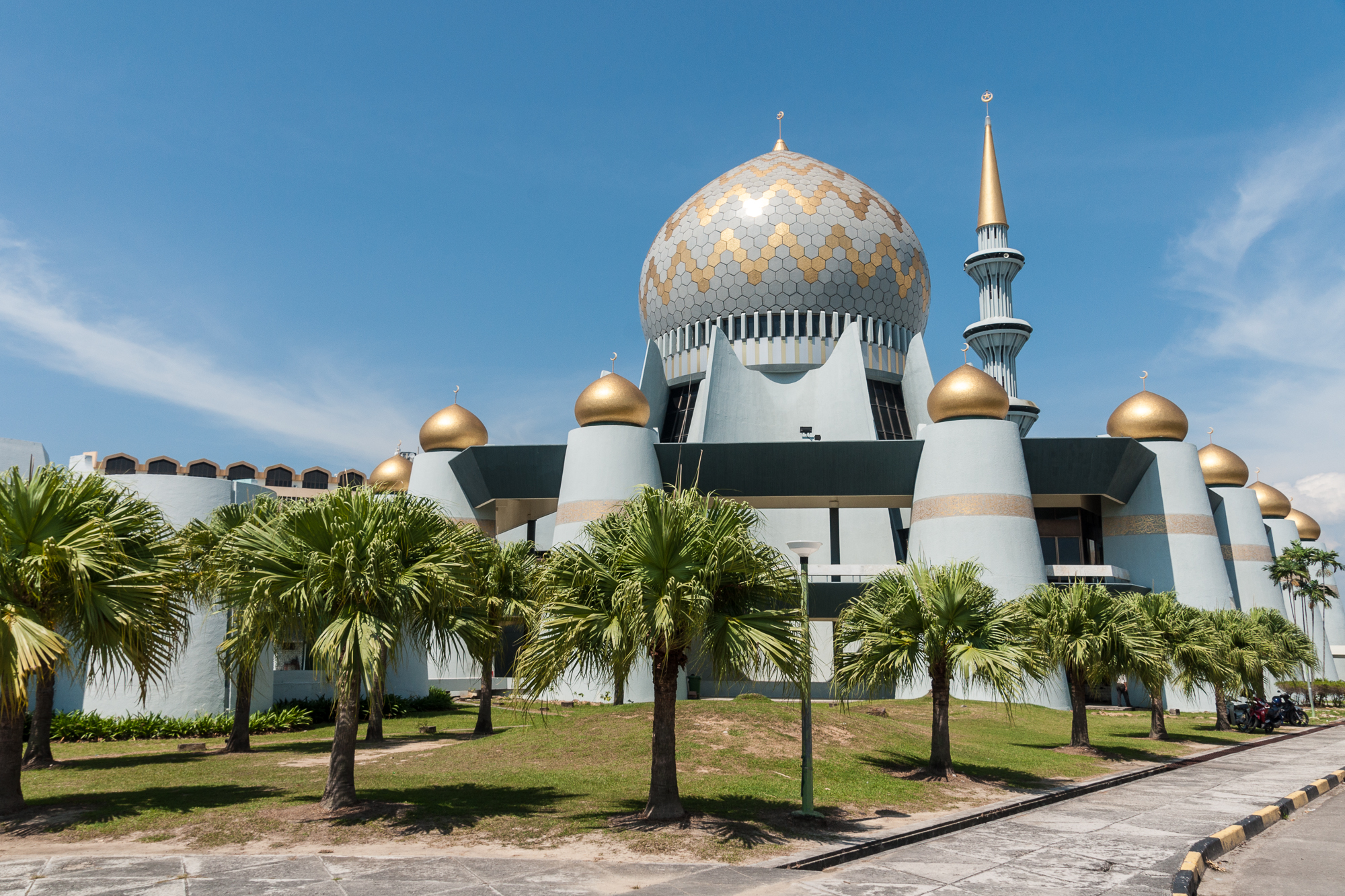
The Sabah State Mosque, another place of worship sights in the city.

There is also a sizeable Filipino population in the city. The first wave of migrants arrived in the late 15th century during the Spanish colonisation, while a later wave arrived in the early 1970s, driven away from the Philippines by political and economic uncertainties there. Most of the earlier migrants have been naturalised as Malaysian citizens. However, there are still some Filipinos living in the city without proper documentation as illegal immigrants.

The majority of Filipino migrants in the city come from the southern Philippines and the Sulu Archipelago, with notable communities of Chavacano speakers and Bangsamoro background. Additionally, there is a significant population of Visayan origin, as well as smaller groups from northern Philippines.

In addition to Filipinos, the city is also home to sizeable residence of Indonesian descent. These groups, primarily of Bugis, Banjarese, Torajans and Javanese ancestry, have established visible presence in the city.

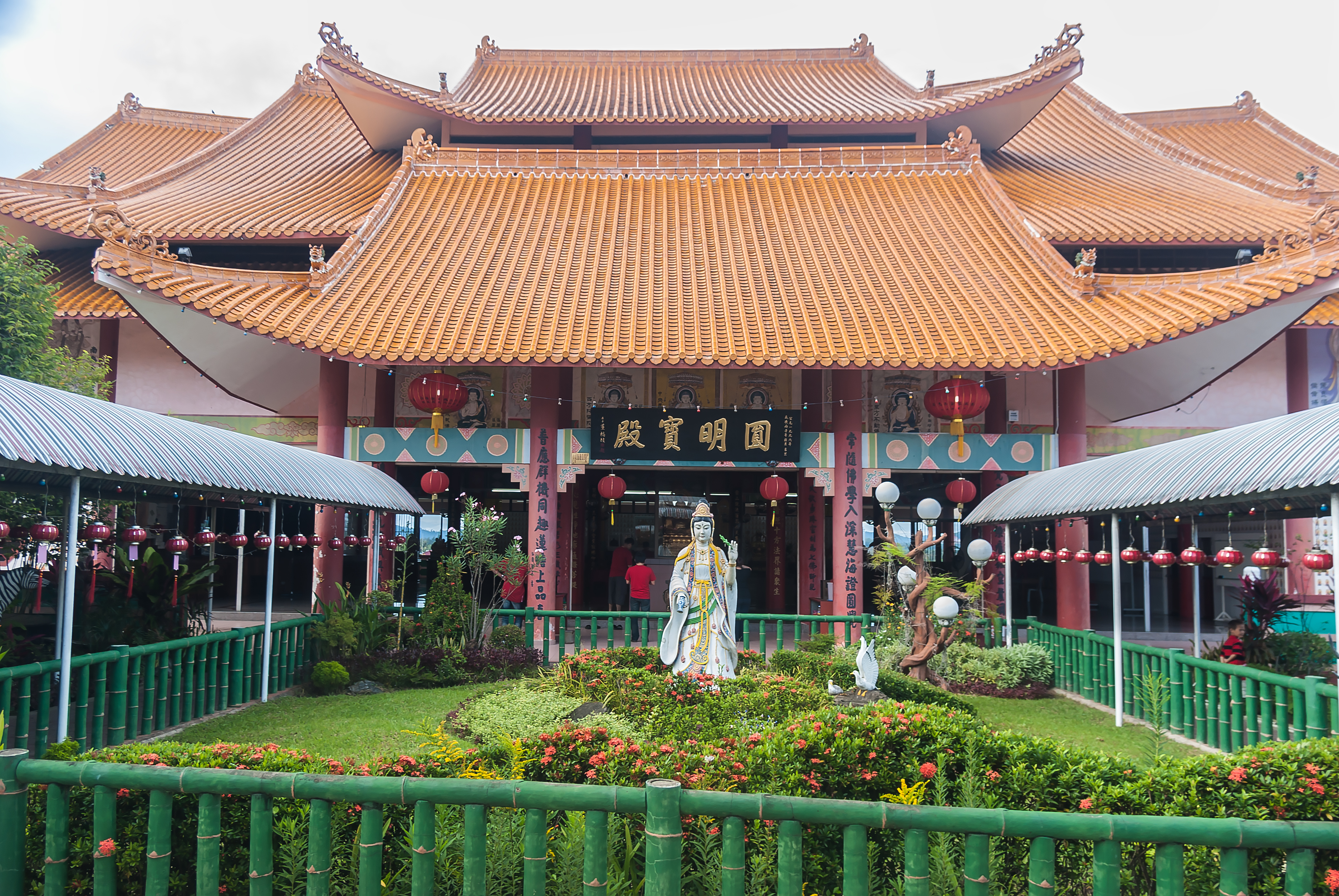
Pu Tuo Si Temple.

There is a small population of Indians, Pakistanis, Timorese and Eurasians scattered around the city. More recently, the number of expatriates living in the city, whether temporarily or permanently, have also increased. Most of them come from China, South Korea, Japan, Australia, Taiwan and Europe.

Interracial marriages across various ethnicities and nationalities are common. A notable example is the union between Chinese and indigenous groups such as the Kadazan, Dusun, Murut and Rungus, known as Sino-Native. The mixed-race descendants are commonly referred to as Sino, with the term adapted to reflect the specific ethnic backgrounds of the parents, such as Sino-Kadazan, Sino-Dusun and others.

=== Languages ===
The people of Kota Kinabalu mainly speak Malay, with a distinct Sabahan creole. However, as about 20% of Kota Kinabalu residents are of Chinese descent, Chinese is also widely spoken. Among the Chinese, the most commonly spoken varieties are Huiyang Hakka (Simplified Chinese: 惠阳客家话; Traditional Chinese: 惠陽客家話) and Mandarin. Additionally, most Chinese can speak Cantonese, although with widely varying levels of fluency. Almost all residents are also able to speak English, especially the younger generation. However, some find it difficult to speak fluently due to a limited vocabulary and the general lack of usage of the English language as a conversational lingua franca among Sabahans as a whole.

The number of Kadazan-Dusun speakers is thought to have dropped significantly throughout Sabah, especially in larger towns or cities like Kota Kinabalu. However, some effort has been taken by some to revive the usage of the language. Kadazan has been considered an endangered language, along with the culture of ethnic Kadazans.

== Economy ==
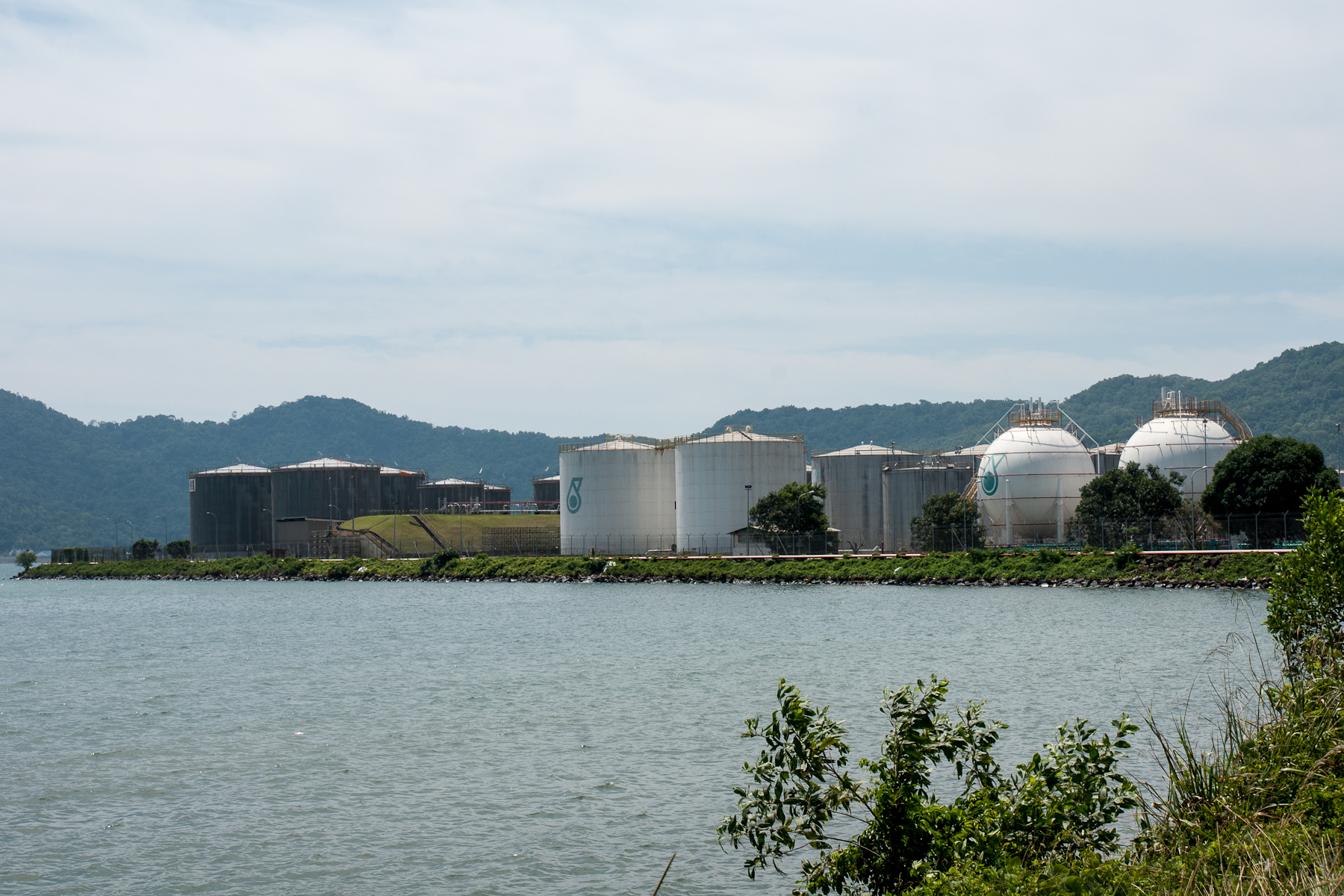
An oil terminal at Sepanggar Bay operated by Petronas.

Besides being the capital city, Kota Kinabalu is also the main industrial and commercial centre for Sabah. The economy is dominated by the primary sector of industry. Historically, the secondary sector dominated the economy, but due to rapid urbanisation and economic development, this sector of the economy is slowly diminishing. More recently, a move towards a more tertiary-based industry has become more apparent, especially with regards to the boom in the tourism industry. Many state-level, national-level and international commercial banks, as well as some insurance companies have their headquarters or branches here. The overseas Chinese population also contributes to the development of KK since their immigration in the late 19th century. Their original role was often a 'coolie' (manual labourer) and today many Chinese work as shopowners.

A number of industrial and manufacturing companies also have plants here, especially in the industrial districts of Likas, Kolombong, and Inanam. The ongoing construction of the 8,320-acre (33.7 km^{2}) Kota Kinabalu Industrial Park (KKIP) in Sepanggar is intended to boost the city's industrial and commercial activity, making it a major growth centre in East Malaysia, as well for the BIMP-EAGA (Brunei-Indonesia-Malaysia-Philippines East ASEAN Growth Area) region.

== Transportation ==
=== Land ===
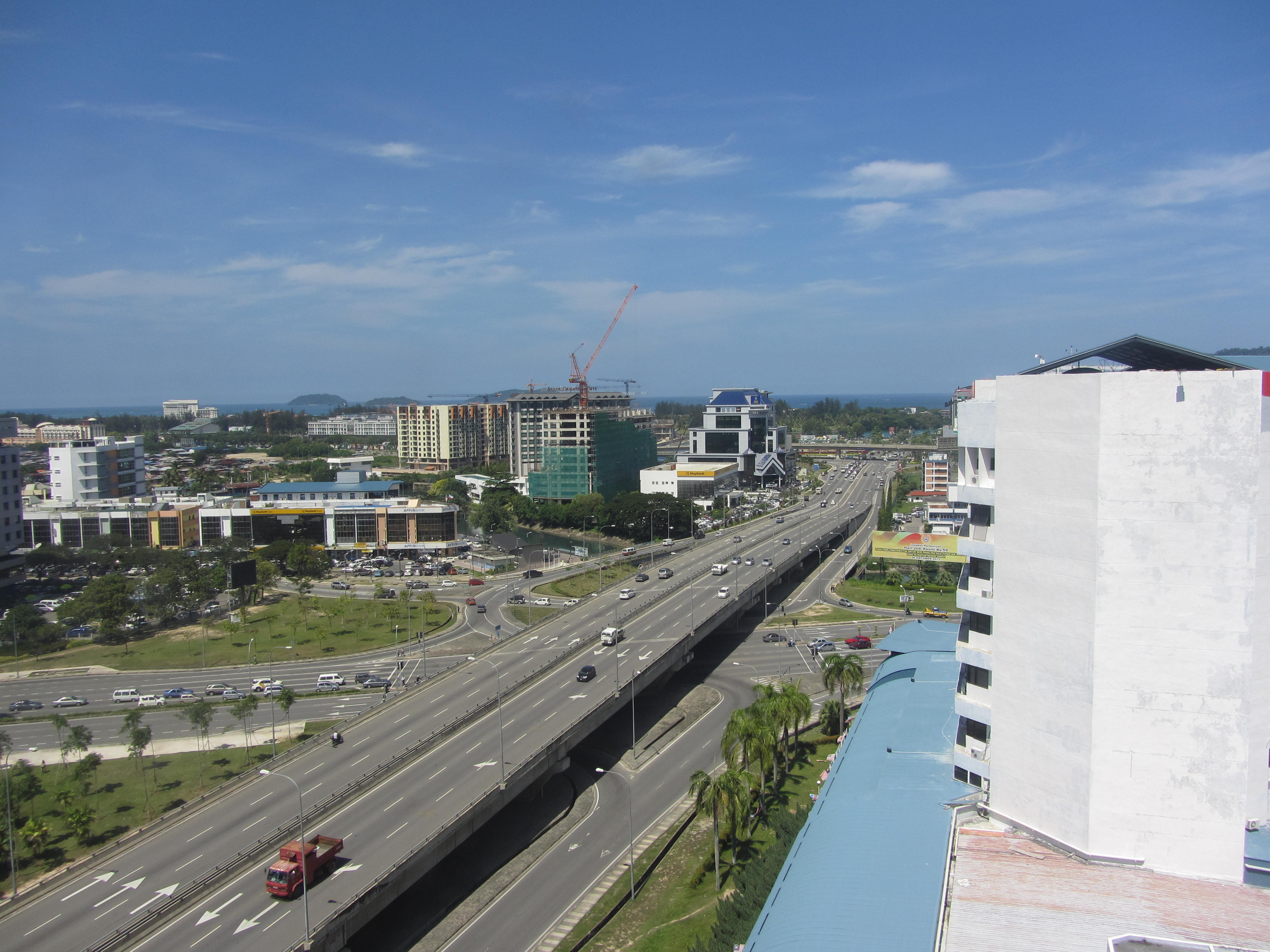
A highway in Kota Kinabalu

The internal roads linking different parts of the city are generally state roads constructed and maintained by the state's Public Works Department. Most major internal roads are dual-carriageways. One of the major roads here is Lintas-Tuaran Bypass Road, which together serves almost as a ring road, circling the city and connecting the districts and suburbs surrounding the city, namely Putatan, Penampang, Luyang, Likas, Inanam, Menggatal, Sepanggar and Tuaran. There are currently no freeways in the city or in any other part of Sabah. The city is linked by highways to other towns in Sabah. These are mainly federal roads maintained by the national Public Works Department. Highway routes from Kota Kinabalu include:

- Kota Kinabalu – Tuaran – Tamparuli – Kota Belud – Kota Marudu – Pitas – Kudat
- Kota Kinabalu – Penampang – (Putatan – Lok Kawi) – Papar – Beaufort – Sindumin (part of the Pan Borneo Highway)
- Kota Kinabalu – Penampang – Tambunan – Keningau – Tenom – Nabawan - Kalabakan - Tawau (completing the Southern route in Sabah, part of the Pan Borneo Highway)
- Kota Kinabalu – Tuaran – Tamparuli – Kundasang – Ranau – Telupid – Sandakan – Tawau (AH150 route, Northern route part of the Pan Borneo Highway)

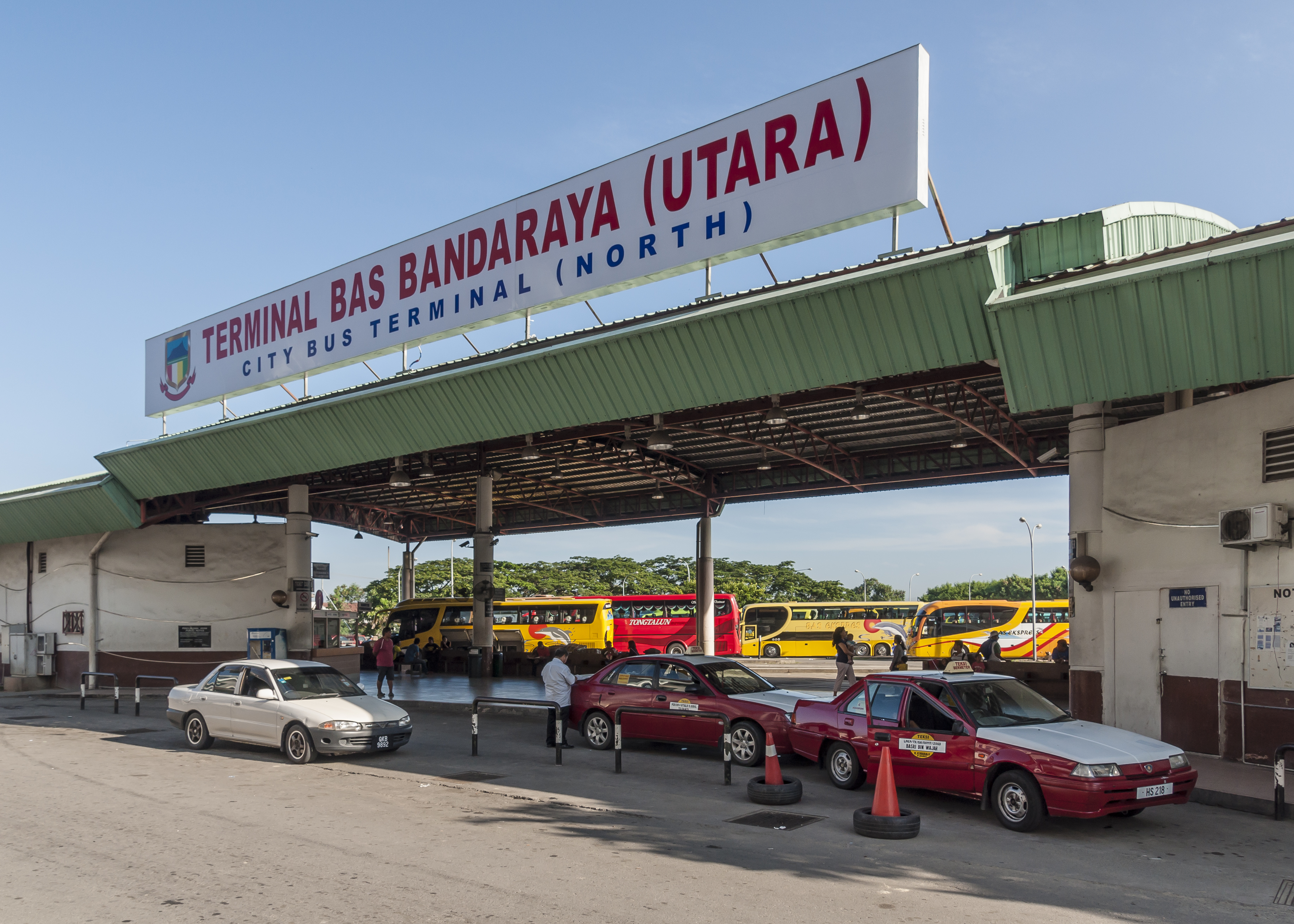
The North Bus Terminal in Inanam serves long-distance buses bound for the north and east of Sabah.

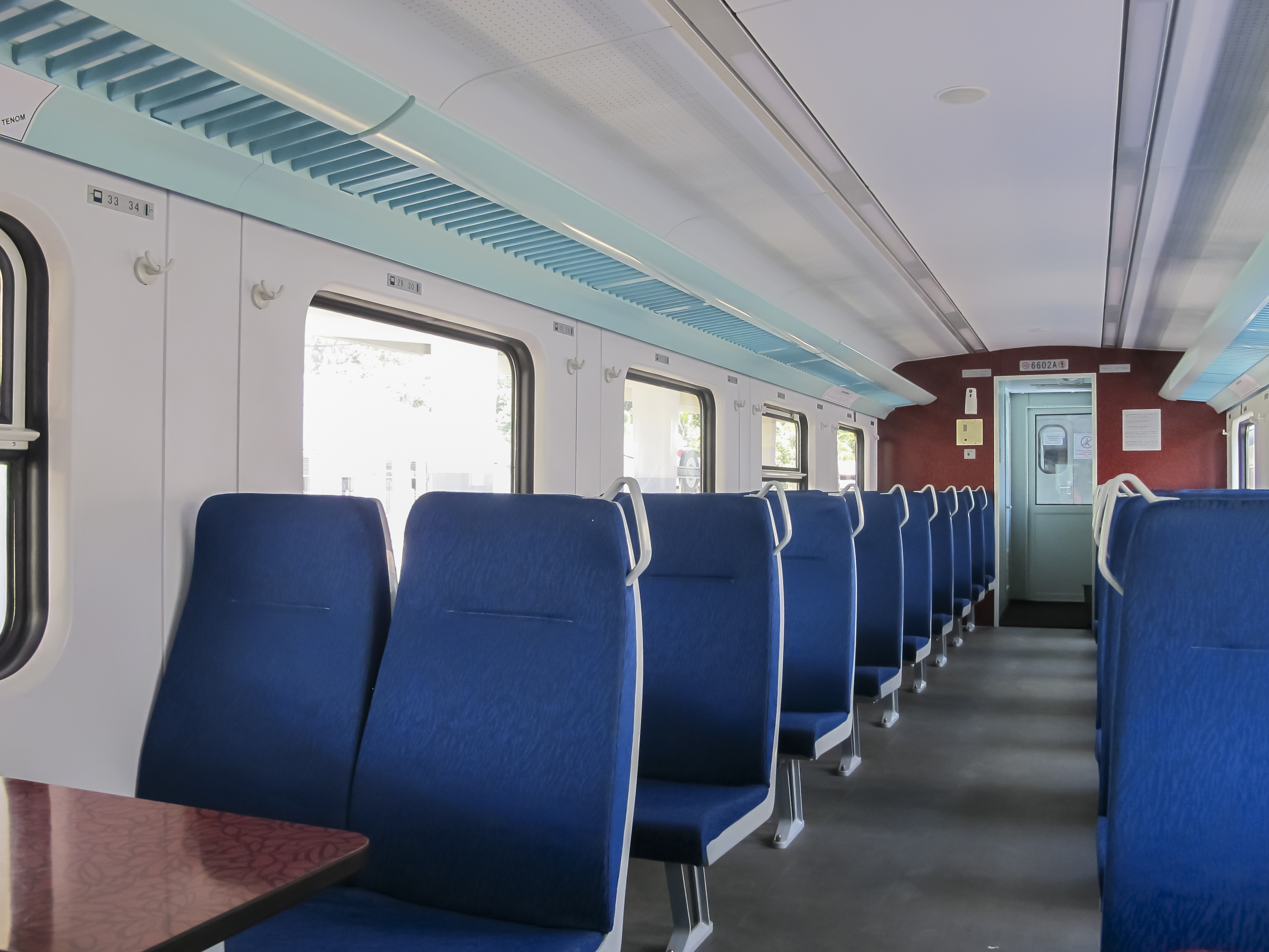
Interior of a train in Tanjung Aru station.

Regular bus services operate in the city. Aside from buses, minibuses or vans are used as an alternative mode of public transport. There are two main bus terminals in the city centre. The terminal along Tun Razak Road provide bus services to different parts of the city and its outskirts, while the KK Sentral terminal provides intercity services to destinations south of the city (Papar, Beaufort, Sipitang, Limbang etc.). A third bus terminal, the North Kota Kinabalu Bus Terminal in Inanam district, services intercity buses heading towards destinations north and north-east of the city (Ranau, Sandakan, Lahad Datu, Tawau, Semporna etc.). Taxis are available throughout the city.

A railway system formerly known as the North Borneo Railway was established in 1896 by the British North Borneo Company. It was built for the main purpose of transporting commodities from the Interior Division to the port in Jesselton (now Kota Kinabalu) during the period of British rule. The railway line connects Tanjung Aru in Kota Kinabalu to Beaufort , Tenom and several other towns in between, and it is the only railway system operating in East Malaysia. Today, the railway line is known as the Western Line and managed by the Sabah State Railway, providing daily services for commuters, travellers, as well as for cargo transportation. A separate company operates the leisure tour also called the North Borneo Railway, which caters mainly for tourists. This antique steam train service only running on Saturday and Wednesday mornings from Tanjung Aru station to Kinarut station before returning to the former station. In 2016, the Tanjung Aru railway station was moved to Aeropod with a new terminal and more public facilities.

=== Air ===
Kota Kinabalu International Airport (KKIA) (ICAO Code : WBKK, IATA Code: BKI) is a main hub for Malaysia Airlines and a secondary hub for AirAsia and MASwings. It has one terminal and is the second busiest airport in Malaysia after Kuala Lumpur International Airport and is one of the main gateways into Sabah and East Malaysia. In addition to domestic flights within Sabah and Malaysia, KKIA is also serviced by international flights to several cities in southeast and northeast Asia, as well as Perth in Australia.

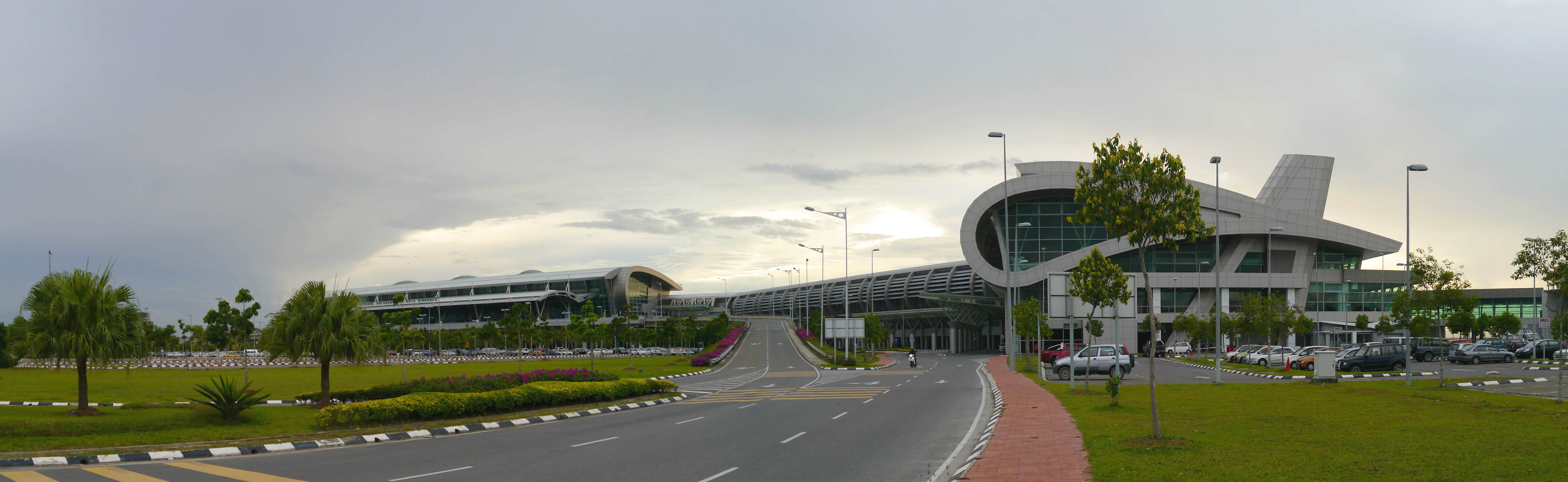
Kota Kinabalu International Airport

=== Sea ===
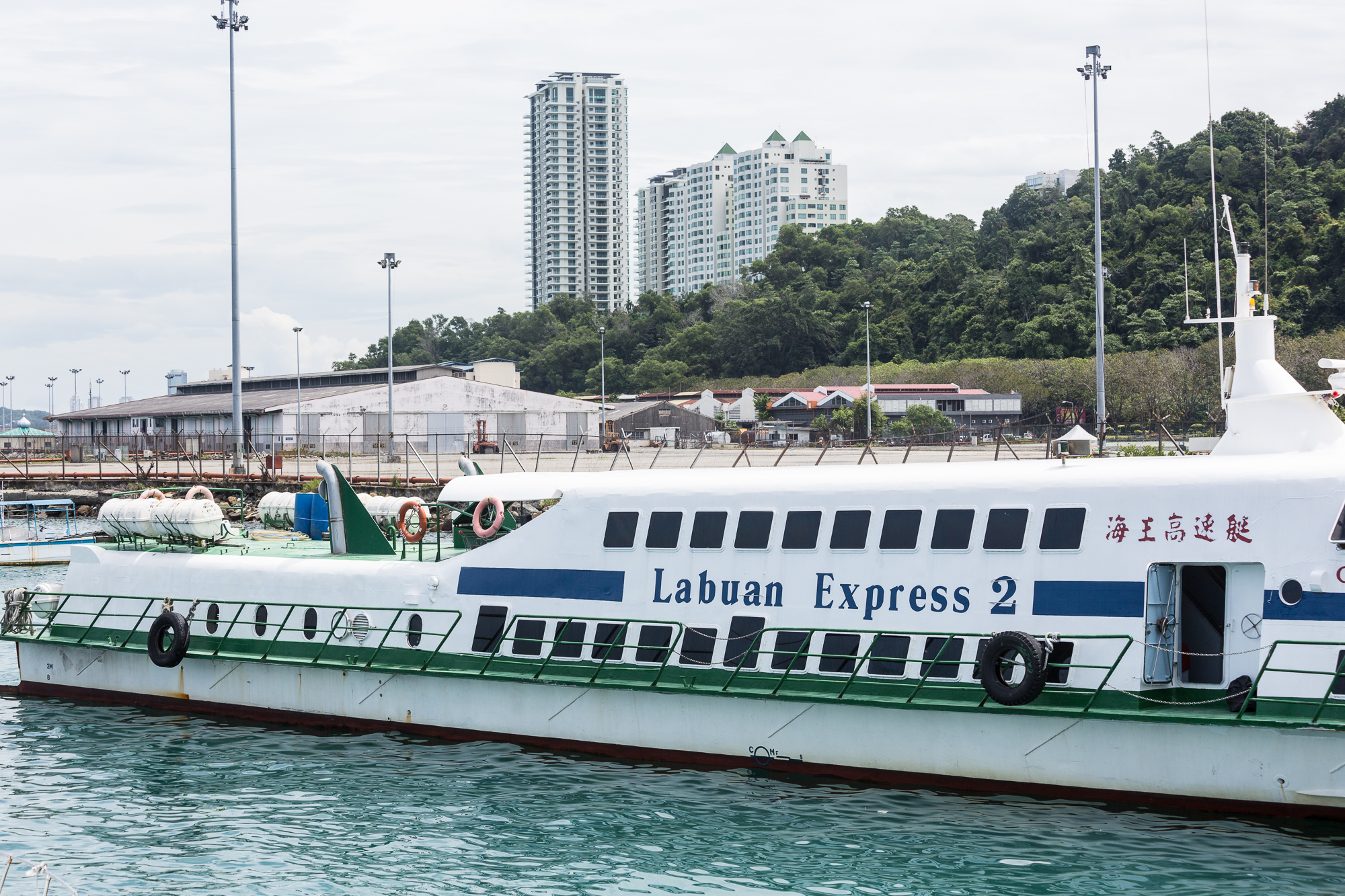
A ferry from Labuan at Kota Kinabalu Ferry Terminal.

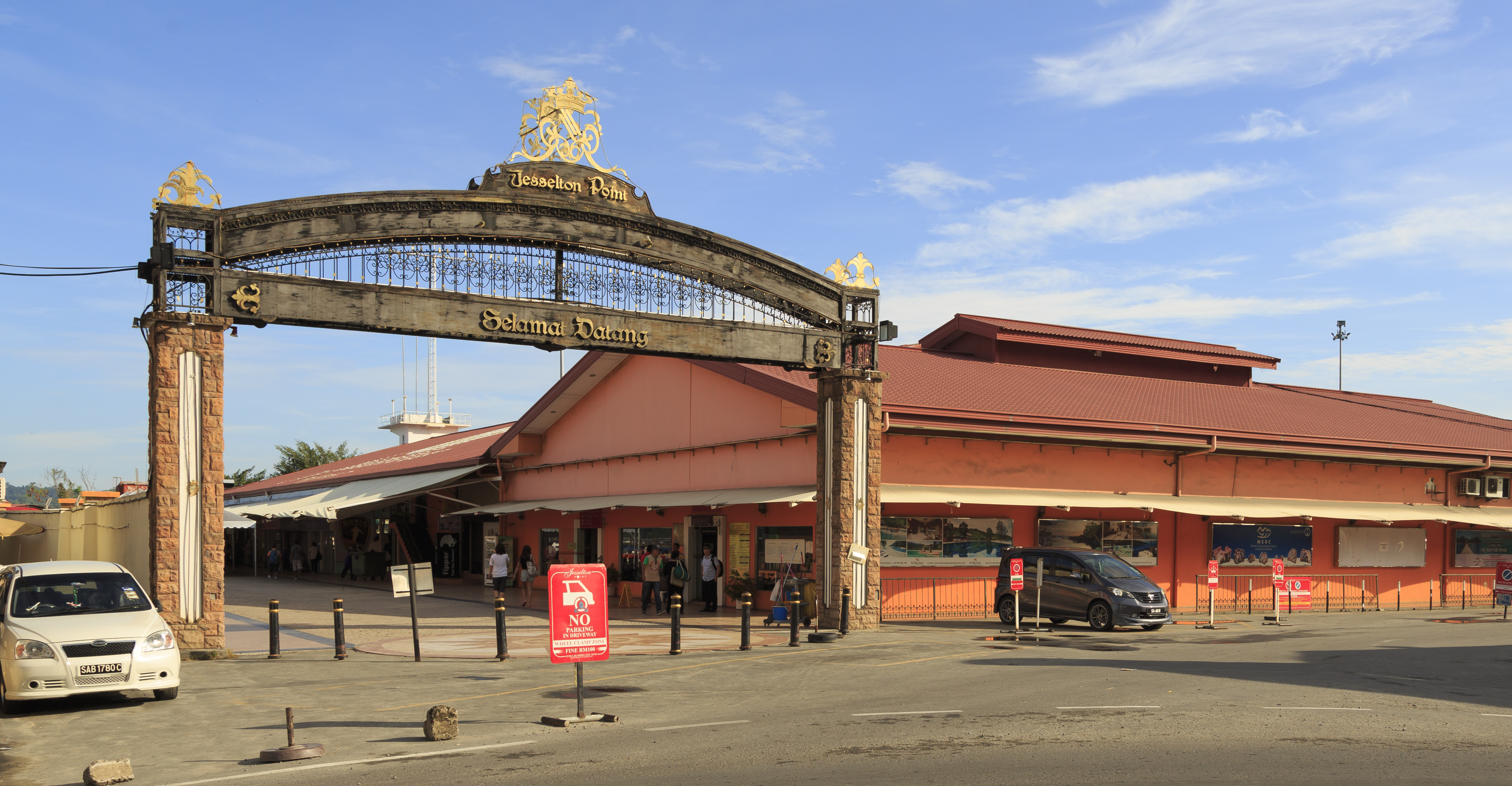
Entrance to the Jesselton Point waterfront.

Kota Kinabalu has two ports: Kota Kinabalu Port and Sapangar Bay Container Port (SBCP). Kota Kinabalu Port mainly handles loose/bulk cargo, while SBCP operates as a naval base for the Royal Malaysian Navy and an oil depot in addition to handling containerised cargo. In 2004, Kota Kinabalu Port handled about 3.6 million tonnes of freight cargo, the third highest in the state after Sandakan Port and Tawau Port. However, it handles the highest number of containers in the state, with 153,793 twenty-foot equivalent units (TEU) of containers handled in 2006. Sepanggar Bay Port will have an annual capacity of 200,000 TEU when its container terminal is completed.

The Kota Kinabalu Ferry Service operates from a passenger ferry terminal located at Jesselton Point, providing ferry and motorboat services to nearby islands. There are also regular scheduled ferry services to Labuan.

== Other utilities ==
=== Courts of law and legal enforcement ===
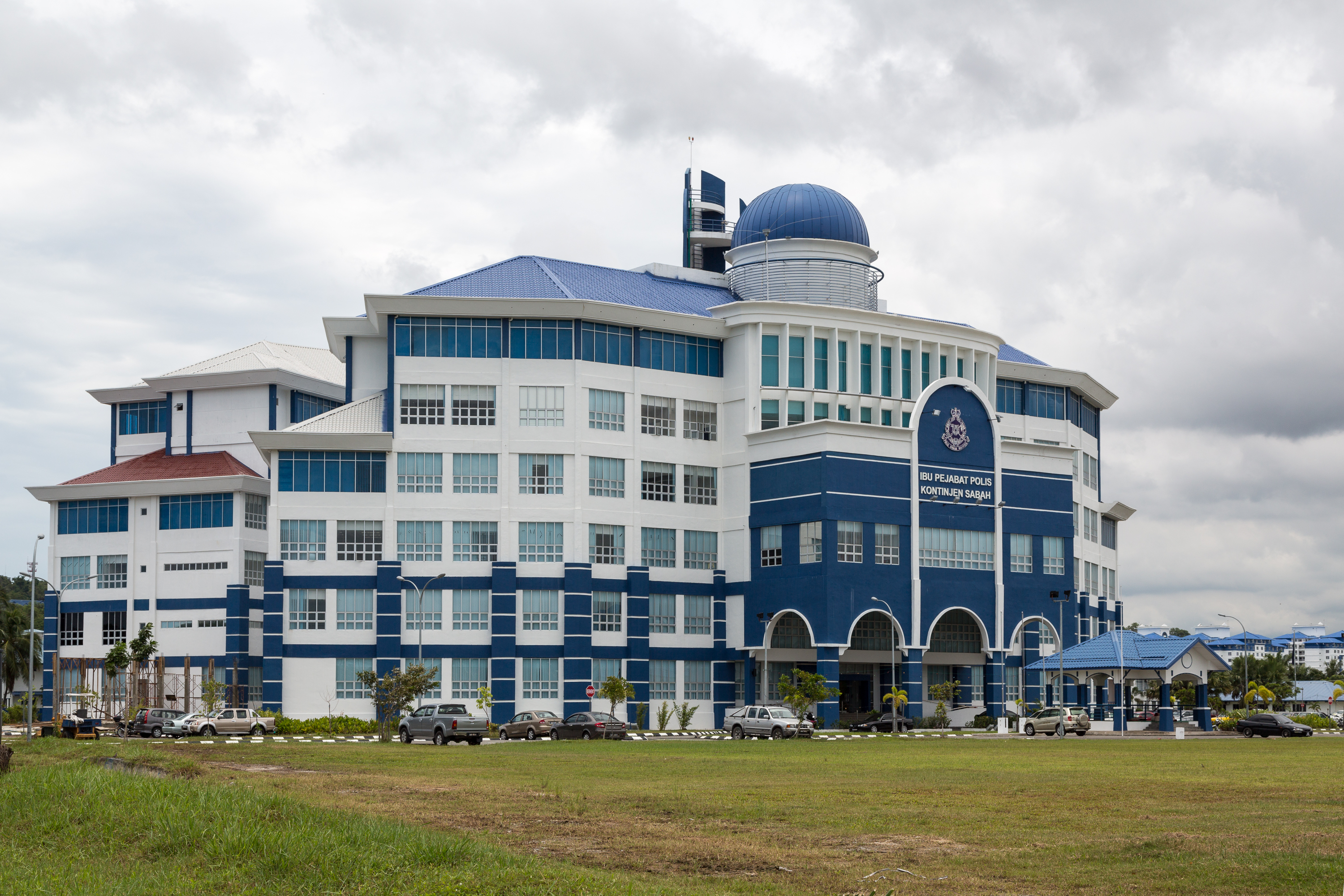
Sabah Police Headquarters.

The Kota Kinabalu Court Complex is located along Kebajikan Road. It contains three High Courts, six Magistrates' courts, six Sessions Courts including the Child Sexual Offence Court and a Federal Court. Another court for the Sharia law were also located in the area of Sembulan.

The Sabah Police Contingent Headquarters is located in Kepayan. There are two district headquarters in the city, the Kota Kinabalu District police headquarters located in Karamunsing, and the Penampang District headquarters. Both also operate as police stations. Other police stations are found in KKIA, Tanjung Aru, Putatan, Inanam, Menggatal, Luyang and Alamesra. Police substations (Pondok Polis) are found in Likas, Telipok and Babagon. The city's traffic police headquarters is located along Lorong Dewan near Gaya Street, and the marine police headquarters is located near the city ferry terminal along Tun Razak Road.

Kota Kinabalu Central Prison is located in Kepayan.

=== Healthcare ===
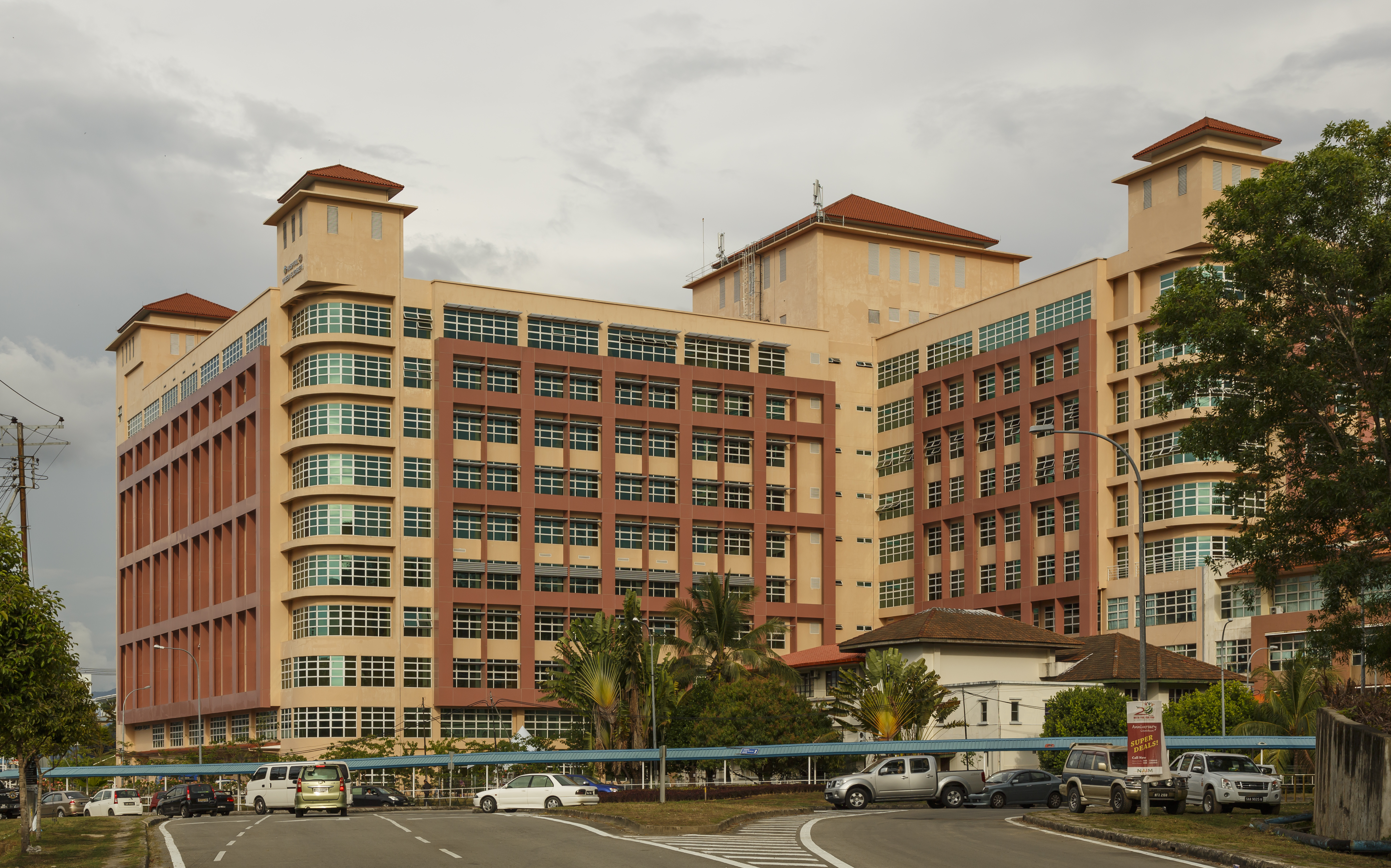
Queen Elizabeth Hospital.

There are three public hospitals, six publics health clinic, two child and mother health clinics, six village clinics, one mobile clinic, and six community clinics in Kota Kinabalu. Queen Elizabeth General Hospital, which is located along Penampang Road and named after Queen Elizabeth II, is the largest public hospital in the state with 589 beds. Built in 1957, it is the most important healthcare centre in the city and one of three general hospitals in Sabah. Queen Elizabeth Hospital II was established then after the acquisition of the former building of Sabah Medical Centre (SMC) in 2009. The second main government hospital are mainly used for heart centre. Hospital Wanita dan Kanak-kanak (Sabah Women and Children Hospital) serves as a referral hospital for children and women. Hospital Mesra Bukit Padang (Bukit Padang Mental Hospital), which opened in 1971, provides psychiatric services for the entire state.

KPJ Specialist Hospital is the largest private hospital with 245 beds. In addition, five other large private health facilities are Gleneagles Kota Kinabalu with 200 beds, Jesselton Medical Centre (JMC) with 73 beds, Damai Specialist Centre (DMC) with 56 beds and Rafflesia Medical Centre (RMC) with 33 beds.

=== Education ===
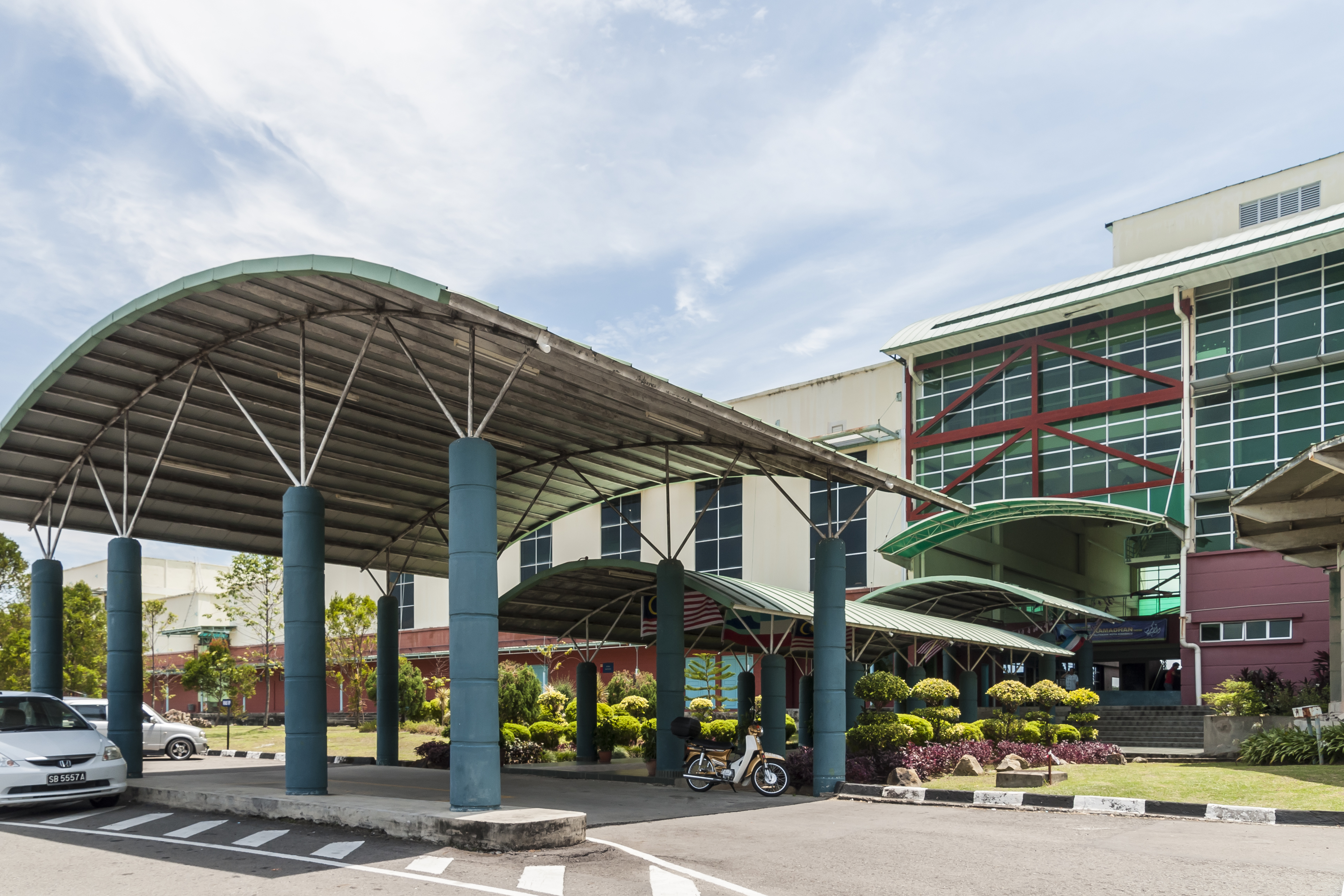
Kota Kinabalu Polytechnic.

There are many government or state schools in and around the city. Among the well-established and prestigious boarding schools in Sabah is Sekolah Menengah Sains Sabah, formally known as Sekolah Berasrama Penuh Sabah (SBPS), which was in Bukit Padang, currently located at Tuaran district, Sabah. Other secondary schools are KK High School, SM La Salle, Sekolah Menengah Shan Tao, Sekolah Menengah Taman Tun Fuad, Sekolah Menengah Likas, Sekolah Menengah Kebangsaan Perempuan Likas, Sekolah Menengah Kebangsaan St. Francis Convent, Sekolah Menengah All Saints, Sekolah Menengah Stella Maris, Sekolah Menengah Saint Michael, Maktab Sabah, Sekolah Menengah Lok Yuk, Sekolah Menengah Kebangsaan Agama Kota Kinabalu and Sekolah Menengah Kebangsaan Agama Tun Ahmadshah.

There are independent private schools in the city. Among them are Sabah Tshung Tsin Secondary School, Kian Kok Middle School, Maktab Nasional and Seri Insan Secondary School.

Classes usually begin at 7 am and end at 1 pm except for boarding schools where classes begins as early as 6.30 am and end at 2 pm. Children age 7 must attend primary education, which consists of six years of learning, while those age 13 can pursue their studies in lower secondary education for three years. After completing their Lower Secondary Examination, students enter Upper Secondary education, where they will be streamed into either the Science or the Arts stream based on their examination results. Students who choose to study at boarding schools will be placed into the Science stream. Currently, there are four boarding schools in Sabah.

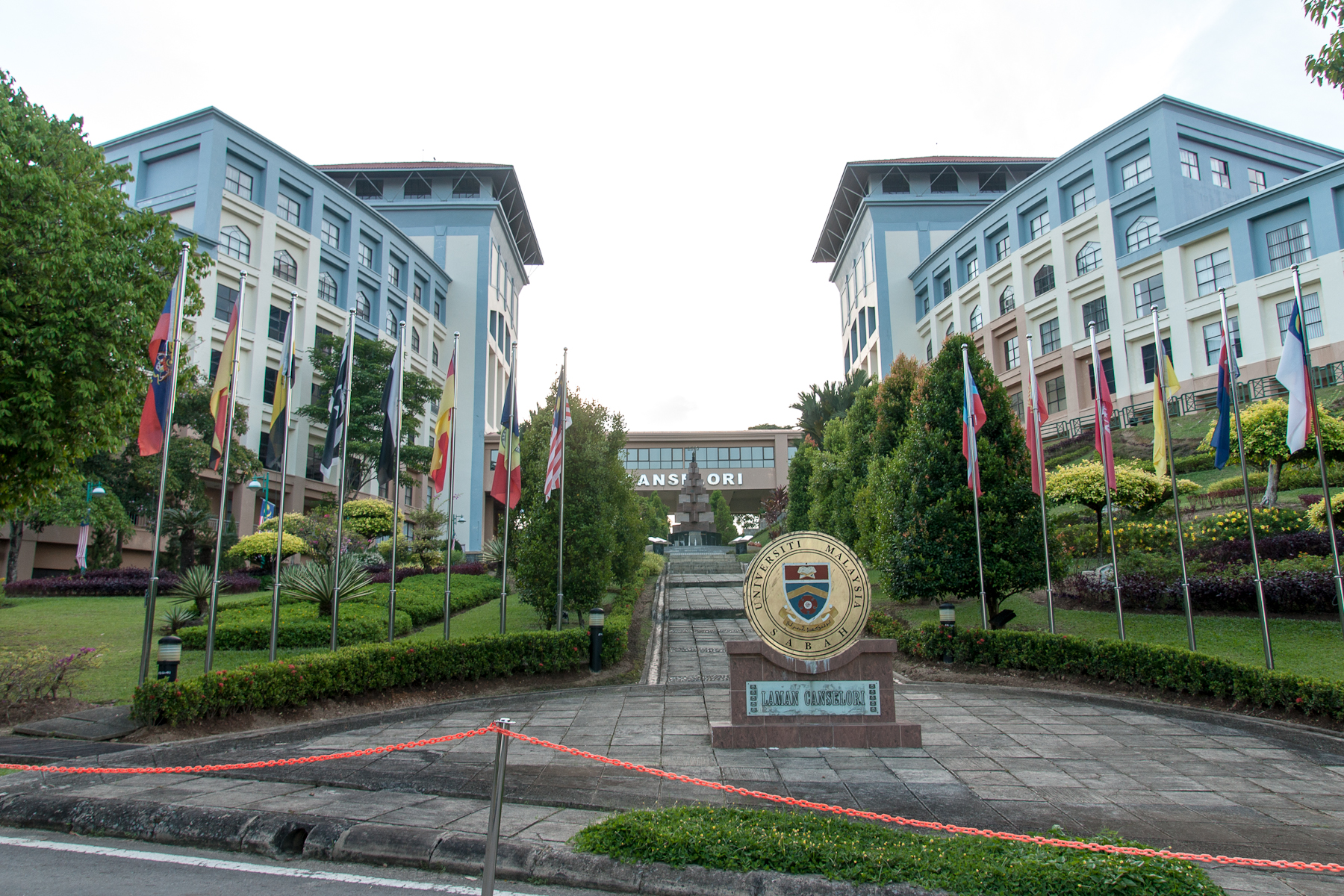
UMS Chancellory Building.

There are two international schools teaching the British Curriculum. Sayfol International School Sabah teaches from kindergarten to the GCE 'A' Levels, which is taken at age 18 (pre-university). Sayfol International School is the sister school of the established and highly successful Sayfol International School in Kuala Lumpur. Kinabalu International School (KIS) is part of the Federation of British International Schools in South and East Asia (FOBISSEA). Both English medium schools are in Bukit Padang. Other international schools are the Kinabalu Japanese School, one of four Japanese schools in Malaysia and the Kota Kinabalu Indonesian School. Both schools cater to children of Japanese and Indonesian expatriates working and living around the city.

Universiti Malaysia Sabah (UMS), founded in 1994, is the largest university in Sabah. Its main campus is on a 999-acre (4.04 km^{2}) piece of land, on a hill facing the South China Sea at Sepanggar Bay, about 10 kilometres north of the city centre. A 6 hectare botanical garden was proposed for its campus in 2010. It has branch campuses in Labuan and Sandakan. The oldest university in Sabah is Universiti Teknologi MARA Sabah which was co-founded by UiTM and Yayasan Sabah in 1973. It has been certified by the Kota Kinabalu City Hall as a litter-free university.

There are private universities / colleges and one polytechnic operating in the city, which are City University Malaysia (Sabah Campus), Tunku Abdul Rahman University of Management and Technology, Universiti Tun Abdul Razak, AlmaCrest International College, INTI College, Kinabalu Commercial College, Jesselton College, Informatics College, Kota Kinabalu Polytechnic and Institut Sinaran. Many affluent residents send their children overseas to pursue secondary or tertiary education.

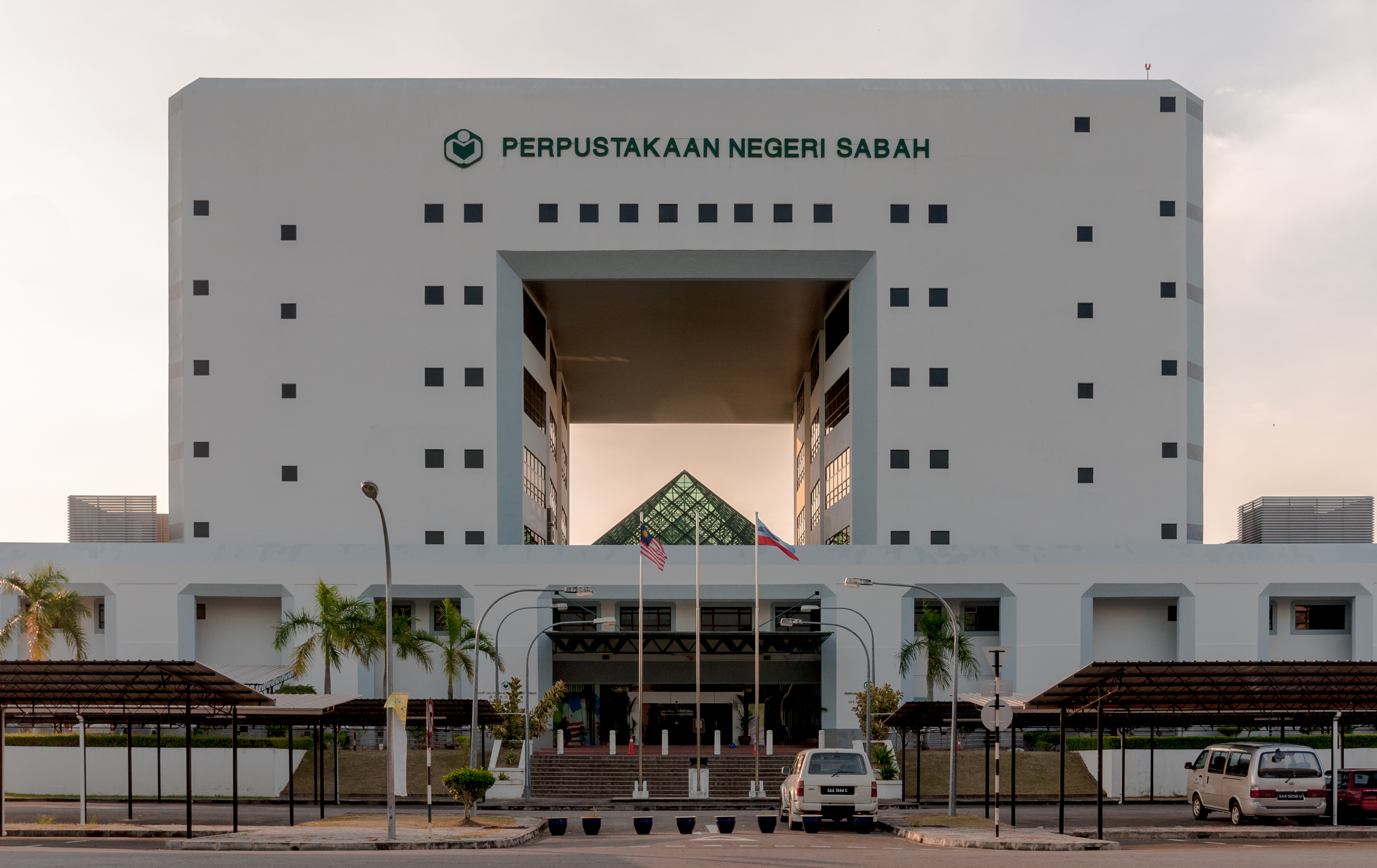
Sabah State Library headquarters in the state.

=== Libraries ===
The Sabah State Library Headquarters is located on Tasik Road Off Maktab Gaya Road while its main branch in Tanjung Aru is sandwiched between Perdana Park and the Plaza Tanjung Aru along Mat Salleh Road as the main library in the state. Other public libraries include the Kota Kinabalu City (Regional) Library, Penampang Branch Library and Menggatal Village Library. They are operated by the Sabah State Library department. Other libraries or private libraries can be found in schools, colleges, or universities.

=== Free Wi-Fi zones ===
On 23 September 2017, the KK City WiFi was announced for public and tourist use in the city with free internet access through high speed fibre via a new submarine cable connecting West and East Malaysia. Each user is entitled to 10GB of quota with no access time limit every day. The first phase covering the area from Tun Fuad Stephens Road to Pantai Road – Tugu Road, Lintasan Deasoka, Kg. Air and Shell.

== Culture and leisure ==
=== Attractions and recreation spots ===
==== Cultural ====
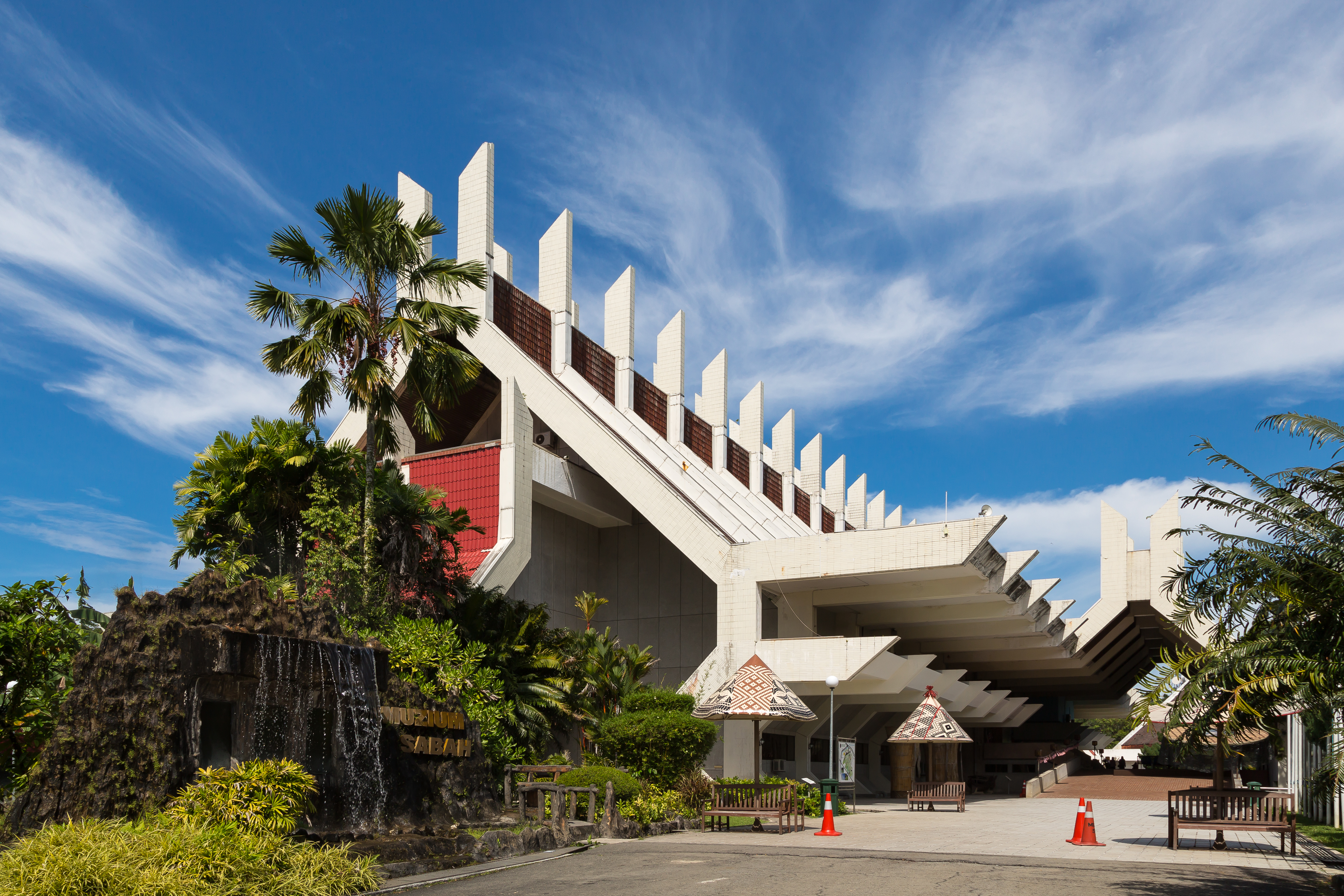
Sabah State Museum, the main museum of Sabah.

There are a number of cultural venues in Kota Kinabalu. The Sabah State Museum, situated near the Queen Elizabeth Hospital, is the main museum of Sabah. In the vicinity of the museum are the Science and Technology Centre, Sabah Art Gallery, and the Ethno Botanic Gardens. Wisma Budaya Art Gallery in the city centre hosts some national as well as regional art exhibitions. The Hongkod Koisaan building in Penampang is home to the Kadazan-Dusun Cultural Association (KDCA). It hosts the annual Kaamatan or Harvest Festival and the Unduk Ngadau beauty contest, which is held concurrently, in May. Monsopiad Cultural Village (Kampung Monsopiad) features cultural shows related to the Kadazan-Dusun culture. It is named after the legendary Kadazan-Dusun headhunting warrior, Monsopiad.

==== Historical ====
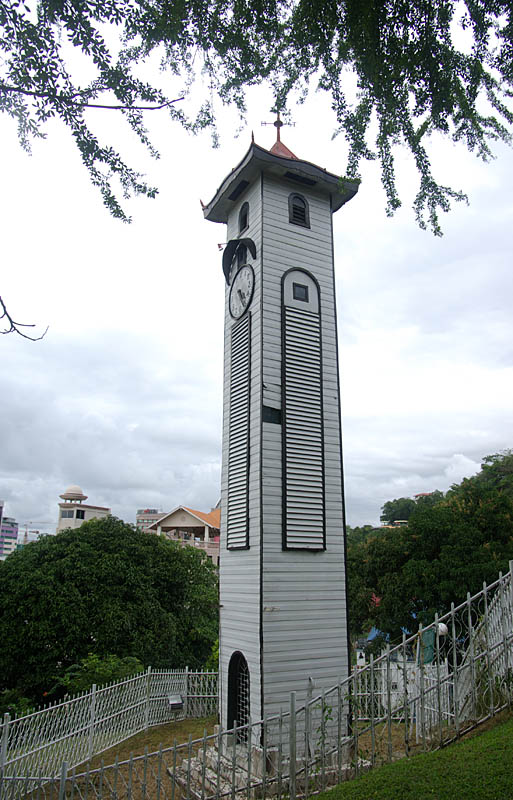
Atkinson Clock Tower, one of the historical landmarks in the city.

The Merdeka Square (Malay: Padang Merdeka) or also known as "Town Field" is the site where the declaration of Sabah's independence and formation of Malaysia took place. The declaration was announced by Sabah's first Chief Minister, Tun Fuad Stephens, on 16 September 1963, also known as Malaysia Day. Today the site hosts the annual City Day celebration on 2 February, Merdeka Day celebration on 31 August, and a number of other celebrations and functions.

The Atkinson Clock Tower near Bandaran Berjaya was built by Mary Edith Atkinson in 1905 in memory of her son, Francis George Atkinson. It was formerly used as a navigation aid for ships. It is only one of three pre-World War II buildings to survive the war. The Petagas War Memorial, located near KKIA, is a reminder of those who died when they went against the Japanese forces during World War II. It is situated at the place where the Kinabalu Guerrillas were killed by the Japanese army in 1944. The Double Six Monument, located in Sembulan, is also a memorial to remember Sabah's first Chief Minister and six other state ministers who died on a plane crash known as the Double Six Tragedy on 6 June 1976.

==== Leisure and conservation areas ====
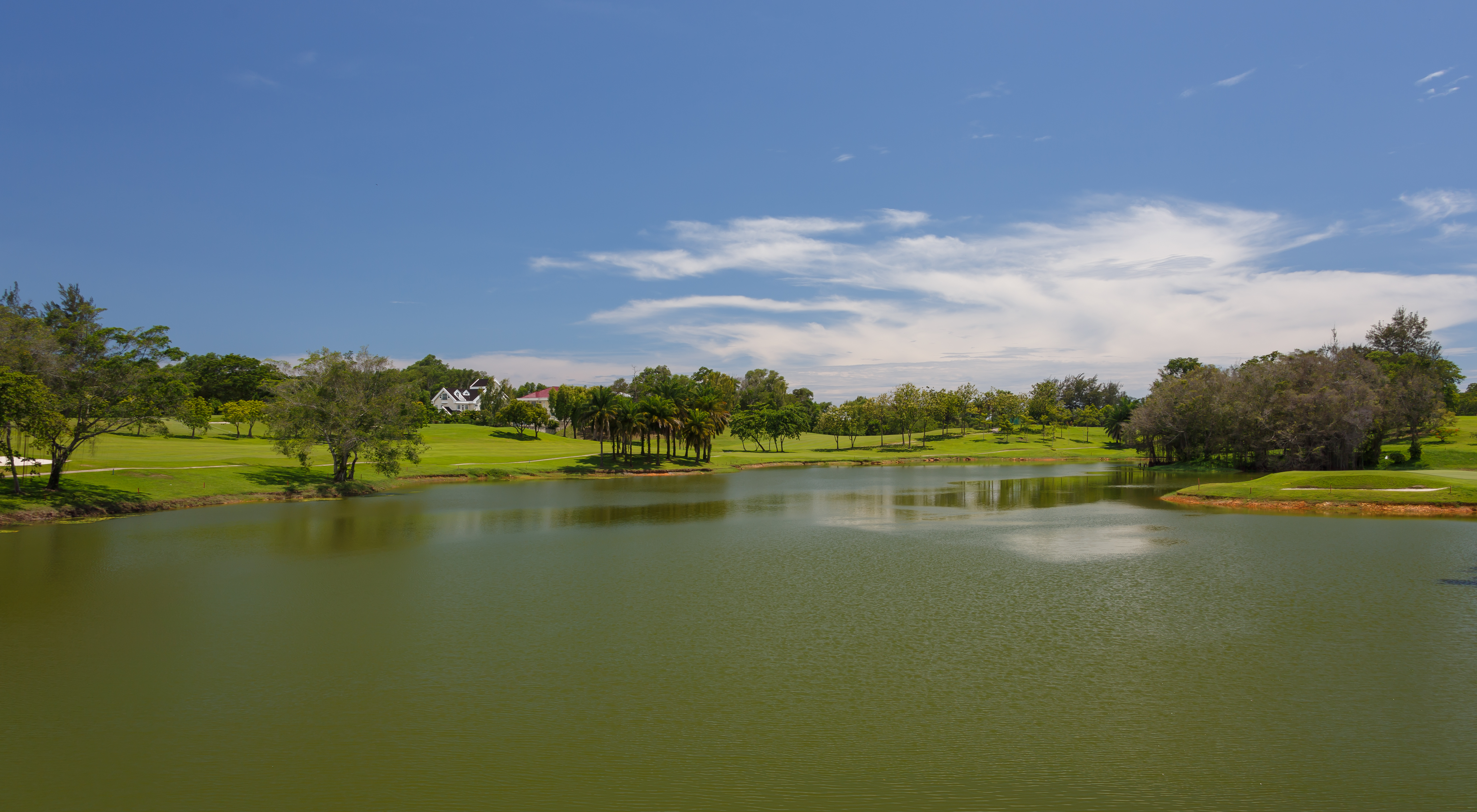
Panorama of Sabah Golf & Country Club.

There are many leisure spots and conserved areas in and around Kota Kinabalu. Anjung Samudra (KK Waterfront) is a waterfront entertainment spot in the city centre which features restaurants, cafes, pubs, and a nightclub. The Royal Sabah Turf Club in Tanjung Aru hosts weekly horse racing events but has since closed and moved to Tambalang Race Course in Tuaran due to the expansion of Kota Kinabalu International Airport. The North Borneo Railway, which begins its journey from Tanjung Aru station, offers a scenic tour of the countryside in the West Coast Division and the Interior Division. The railway journey ends in the town of Tenom. Sutera Harbour Golf & Country Club near the city centre was built on reclaimed land. It features a golf and country club, a marina, and two hotels.

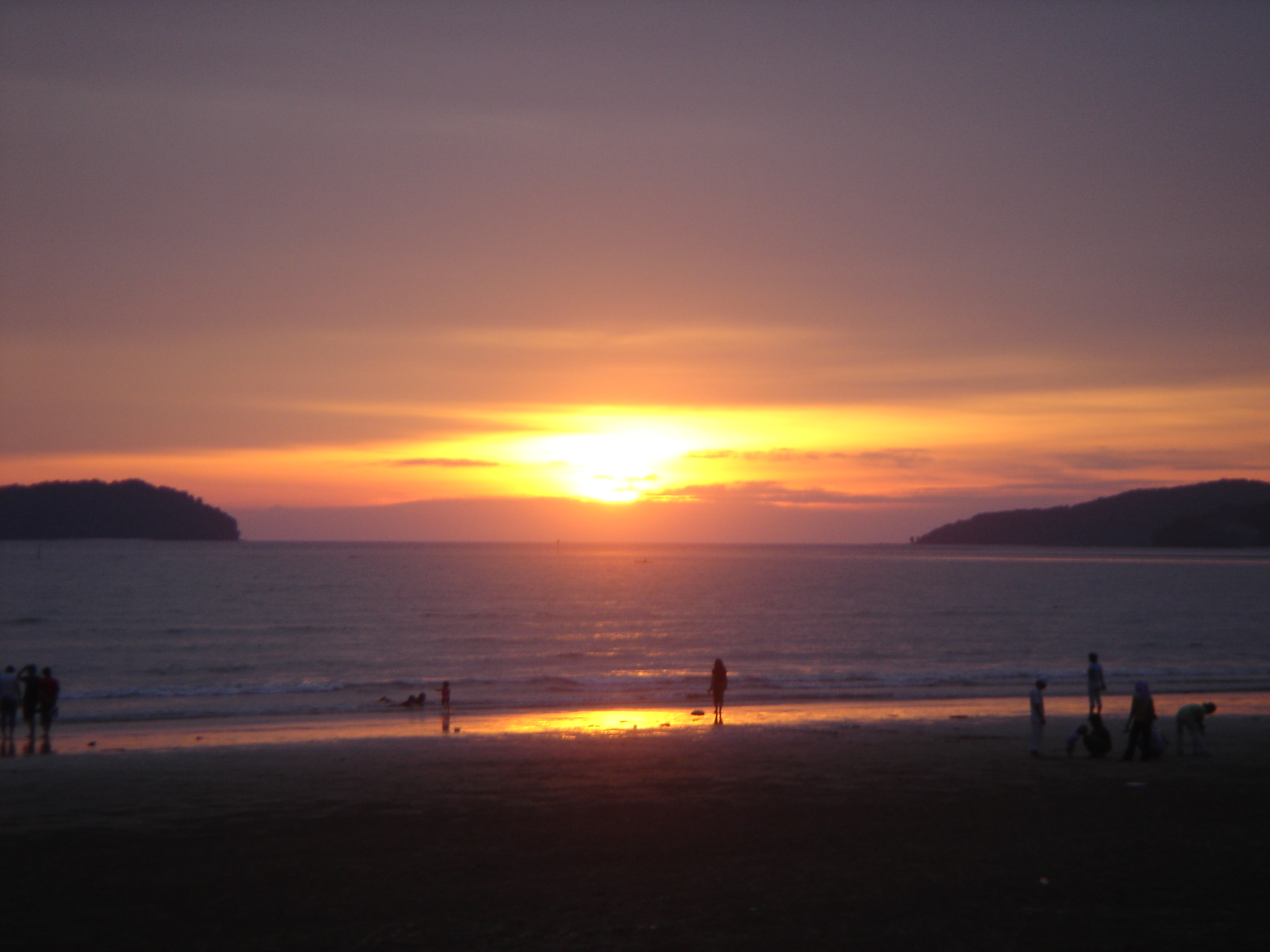
Sunset at Tanjung Aru beach. Sulug Island can be seen on the left and Manukan Island on the right of the horizon.

Tanjung Aru, located about 10 kilometres, 6 miles, from the city centre, is one of the beaches along the West Coast. Its name was derived from the casuarina trees (locally called Aru trees) that grow on the shoreline. The beach is 3 kilometres in length. The entrance car parking area to Tanjung Aru has increase in size as the previous building that were on the site have been demolished in 2017. In the vicinity of Tanjung Aru lies the Kinabalu Golf Club, Prince Philip Botanical Park, KK Yacht Club, and Shangri-La's Tanjung Aru Beach Resort. Prince Philip Park is freely accessible to the public, while the others need permission. This beach is known for its sunset views.

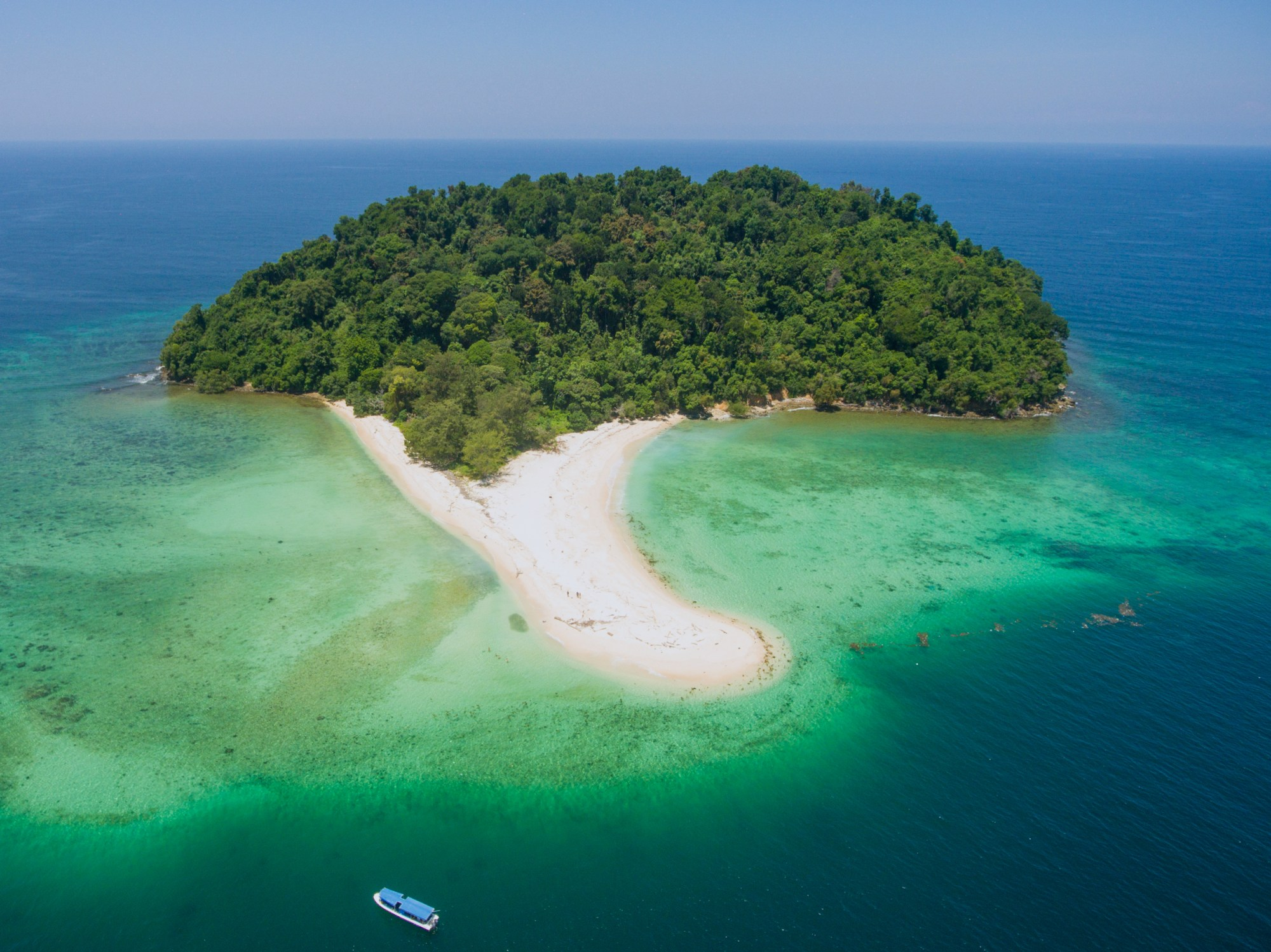
Manukan Island boat ride from Kota Kinabalu.

Located within the Likas Bay area is the Kota Kinabalu City Bird Sanctuary. With an area of 24 acres (9.7 ha), it is one of the few remaining patches of mangrove forest that once existed extensively along the coastal region of Kota Kinabalu. It was conserved in September 1996 by the State Government to assist and foster a better understanding and awareness of the value of wetlands. The Sabah Zoological and Botanical Park (Lok Kawi Wildlife Park) in Lok Kawi, about 20 kilometres south of the city, is the first zoo in Sabah. Set on a 280-acre (1.1 km^{2}) piece of land, it is arguably the largest zoo in Malaysia.

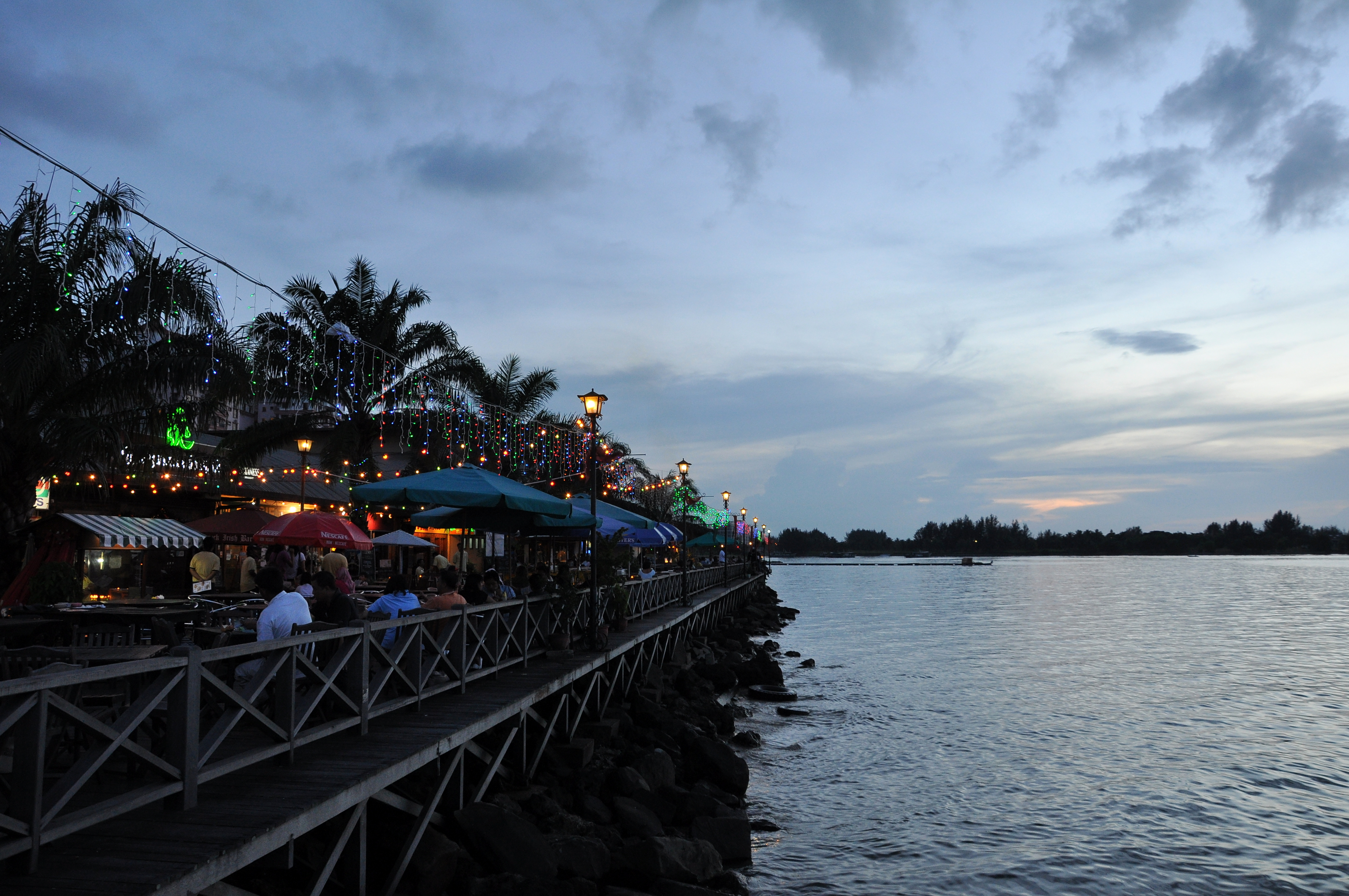
The boardwalk in Kota Kinabalu at dusk.

Tun Fuad Stephens Park, located in Bukit Padang, is used for jogging and hiking by locals. It is surrounded by forests and also features a man-made lake. It has a few food stalls and restaurants. Tunku Abdul Rahman Park is a State Park consisting of the islands of Sapi, Mamutik, Manukan, Sulug and Gaya. It is used for snorkelling. The park is about a 10 to 15 minutes boat ride away from the city ferry terminal. Babagon River in Penampang and Kiansom Falls near Inanam are also places visited for picnics and leisure bathing.

Outside the city, Crocker Range Park, occupying a stretch of c. 20 x 80 km of the Crocker Range mountain chain to the city's southeast (roughly between Tenom and Tambunan, is a common spot for jungle trekking and camping. Kota Kinabalu is also the gateway to one of the most popular conservation areas in Malaysia, Kinabalu Park. The park is a two-hour drive away from the city and Mount Kinabalu, which is the 10th highest peak in South-East Asia and the highest in Malaysia, is located there. The Rafflesia Forest Reserve near Tambunan, which is 30 kilometres away from Kota Kinabalu, is also within the Crocker Range National Park boundary. One of the smaller species of Rafflesia, R. pricei, can be found there. The Gunung Emas Highland Resort is also nearby. The Tuaran Crocodile Farm, about 30 kilometres north of the city, has around 1400 crocodiles in its enclosure, making it the largest of its kind in Sabah.

==== Other sights ====
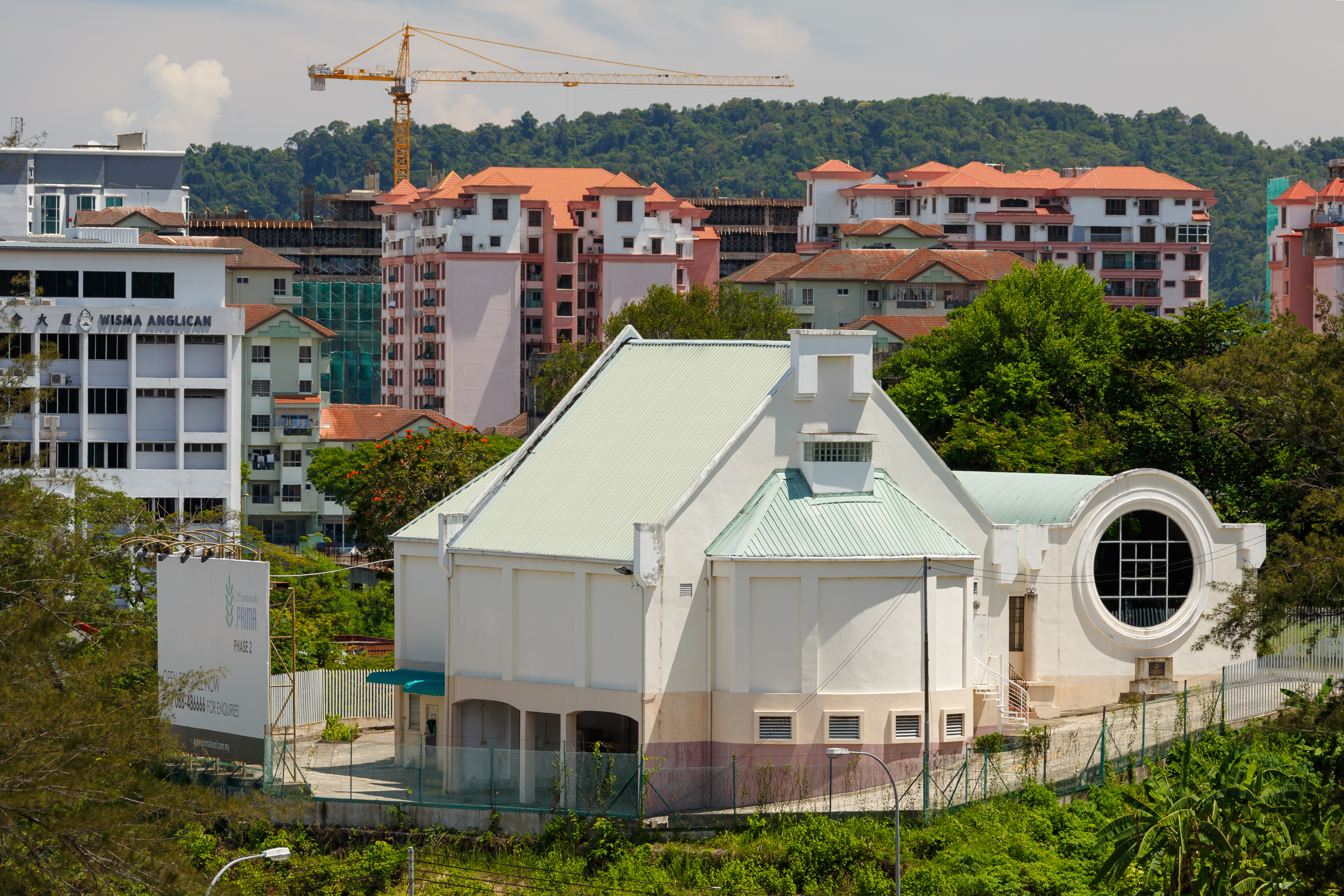
The Jesselton Freemason Hall on top of a hill in the city.

The Tun Mustapha Tower (formerly Sabah Foundation Building) is about a 10-minute drive from the city centre. This 30-storey glass building is supported by high-tensile steel rods, one of only three buildings in the world that is built using this method.

Other buildings and sites in the city are the stilt villages found in the areas of Sembulan, Tanjung Aru, Kampung Likas, and Kampung Pondo in Gaya Island. These houses are built on shallow coastal waters and are homes for the Bajau and Suluk inhabitants.

The Sabah State Mosque in Sembulan is the main mosque in the city. The City Mosque on Likas Bay is another significant landmark in the city. On top of a hill in the city, there is also a freemason hall.

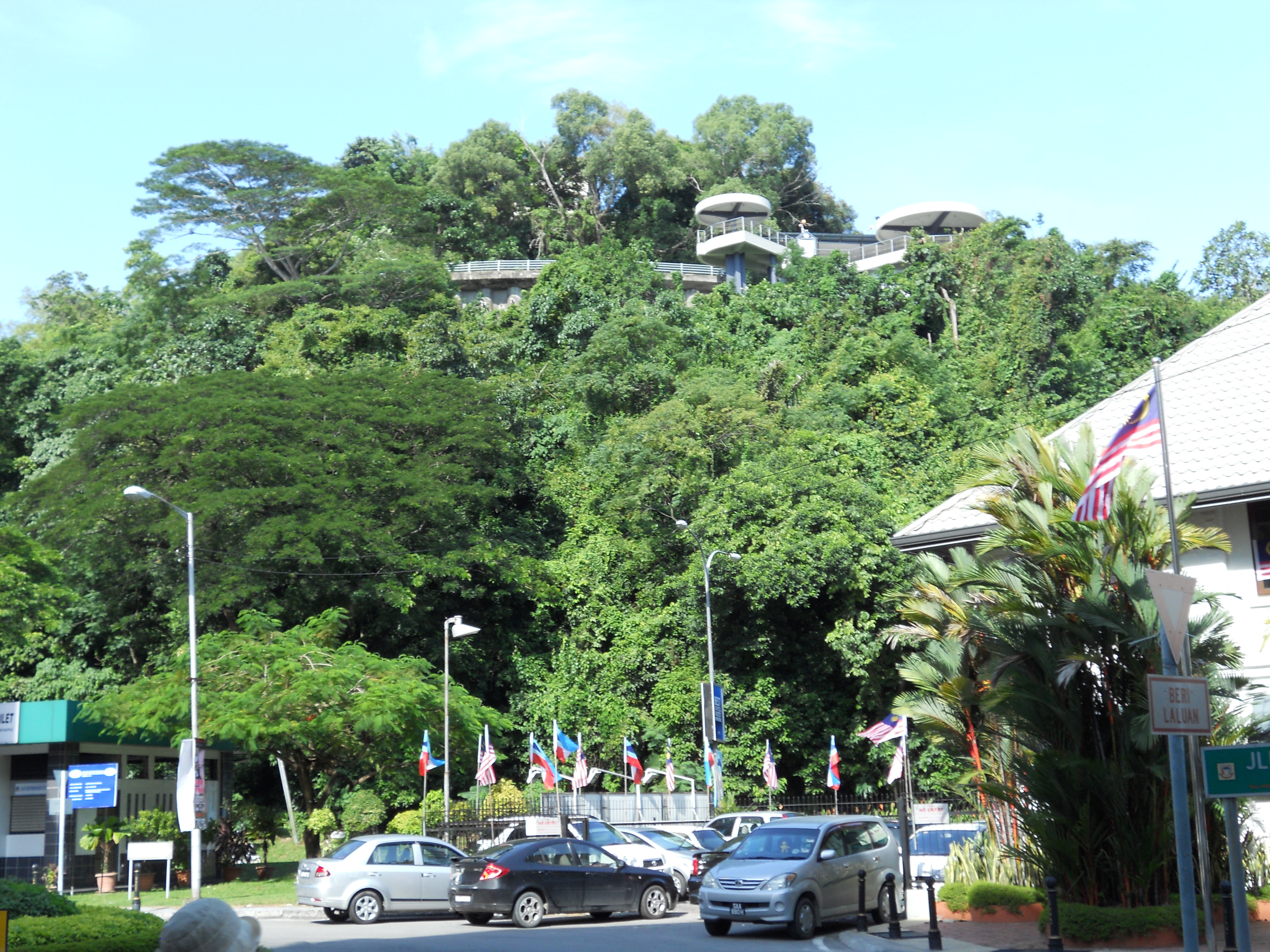
The Signal Hill Observatory on top of a hill along Jalan Asrama.

The Signal Hill Observatory viewing platform and snack shop is accessible via steps leading up from the near the City Centre. It is the highest point in Kota Kinabalu and offers sweeping, scenic, unobstructed views of the city and the islands beyond.

==== Shopping ====
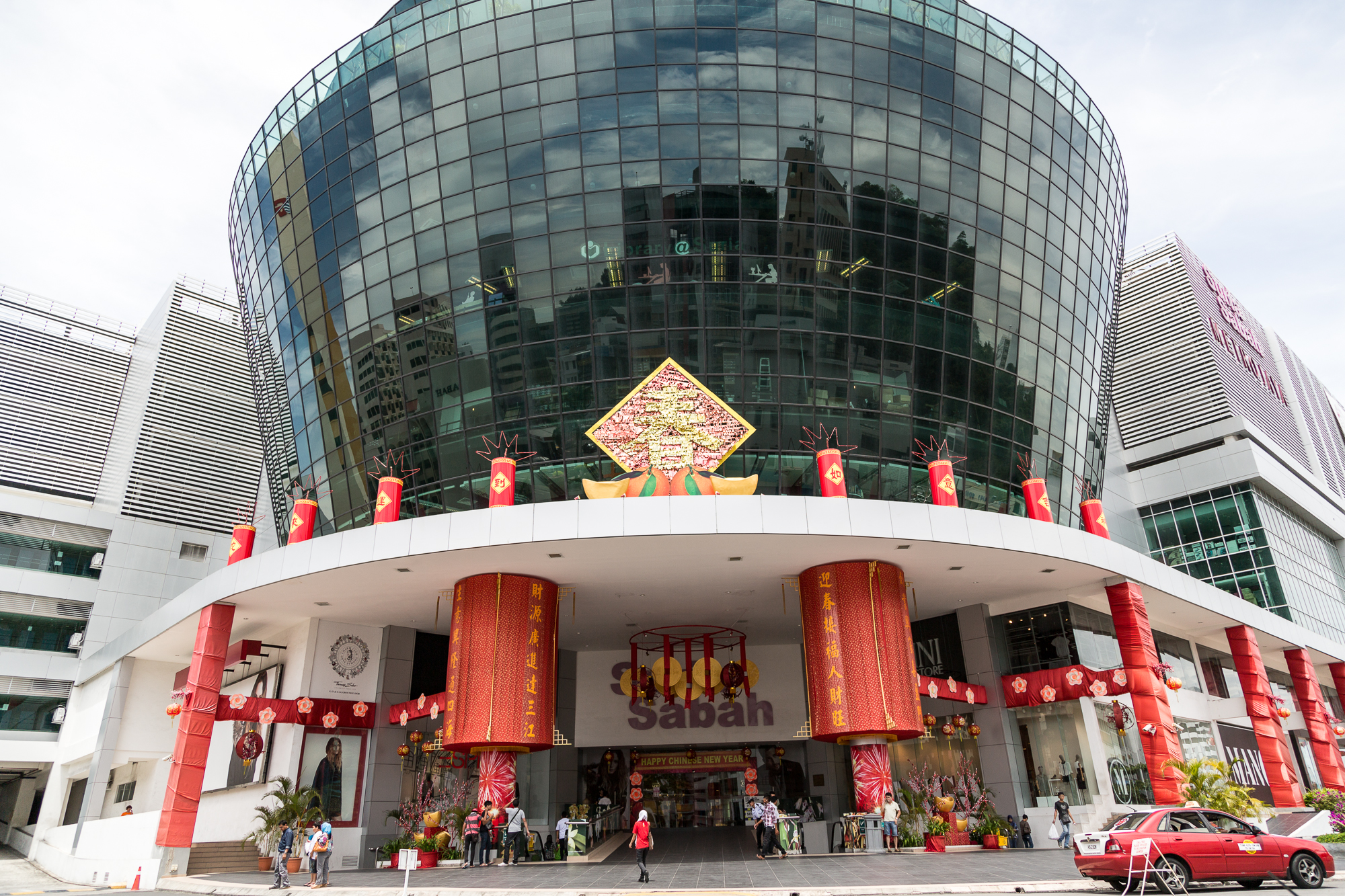
Suria Sabah during the 2013 Chinese New Year celebrations, this is also one of the shopping malls in the city.

Kota Kinabalu also features a number of shopping malls. These include Imago KK Times Square, Oceanus Waterfront Mall, Karamunsing Complex, Centre Point, Wisma Merdeka, Warisan Square, Plaza Wawasan, Asia City Complex, City Mall, KK Plaza, Mega Long Mall, Suria Sabah and 1Borneo, which is the largest hypermall in Kota Kinabalu. Karamunsing, where Karamunsing Complex is situated, is an area that has more computer shops per capita than anywhere else in Sabah. The weekly Gaya Street Sunday Market features a gathering of local hawkers selling a wide range of items from traditional ethnic cultural souvenirs to pets and flowers. The Anjung Kinabalu (formerly known as the Kota Kinabalu Handicraft Market) features vendors selling traditional handicrafts, souvenirs and foodstuffs.

==== Entertainment ====
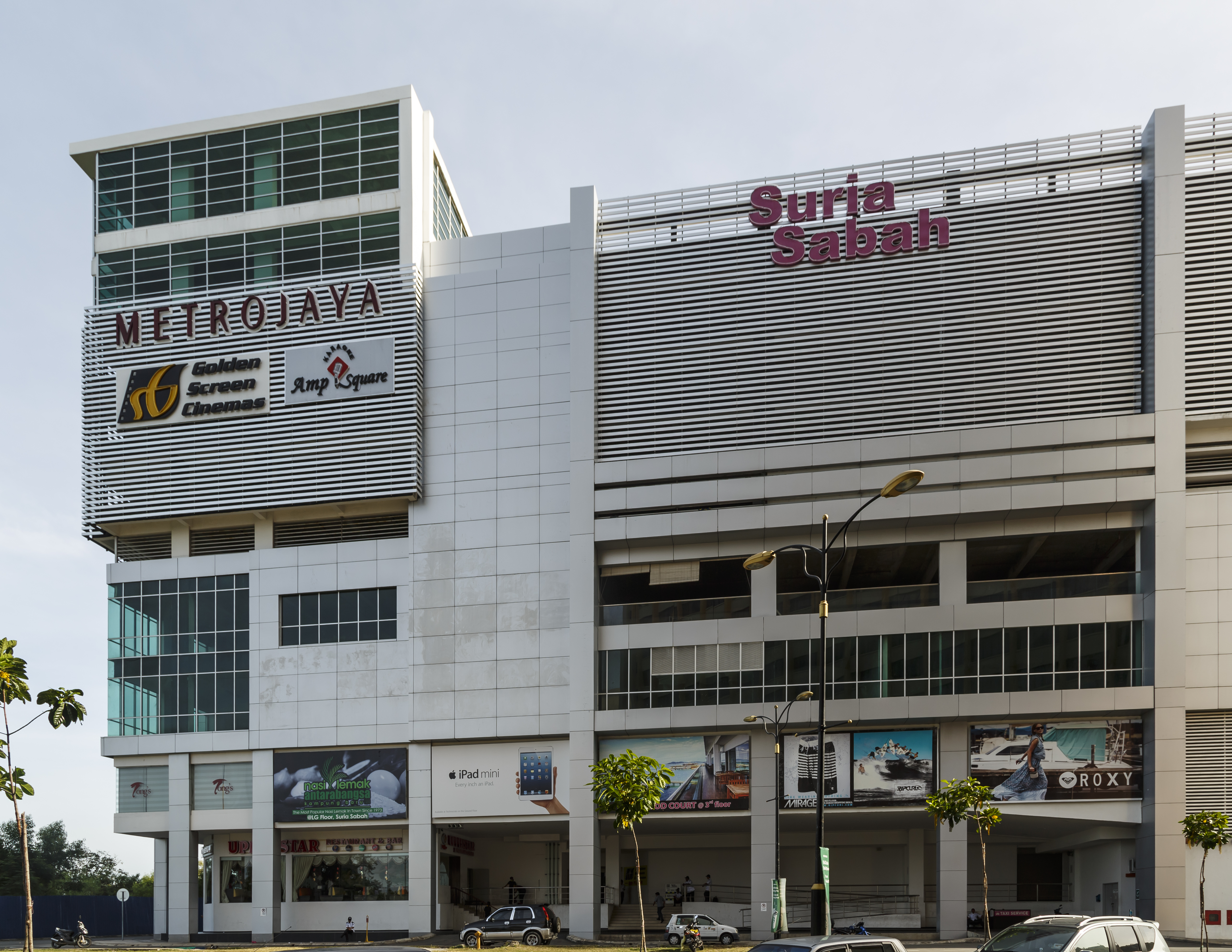
Golden Screen Cinemas which is located at Suria Sabah Shopping Mall.

There are six cinemas in Kota Kinabalu: 2 Golden Screen Cinemas (commonly known as GSC), MBO cinemas located at Imago Mall Kota Kinabalu Times Square, City Cineplex at City Mall, Growball Cineplex at Centre Point Mall and Megalong Cineplex at Megalong Mall. One of the GSC cinemas is located at Suria Sabah Shopping Mall, while the other is located at 1Borneo. Both GSC cinemas hold eight cinema halls each. 1Borneo Hypermall and Sutera Harbour Marina have bowling alleys and pool tables. MBO Cinemas with a capacity of 1,038 is located in Imago Mall, KK Times Square.

=== Sports ===
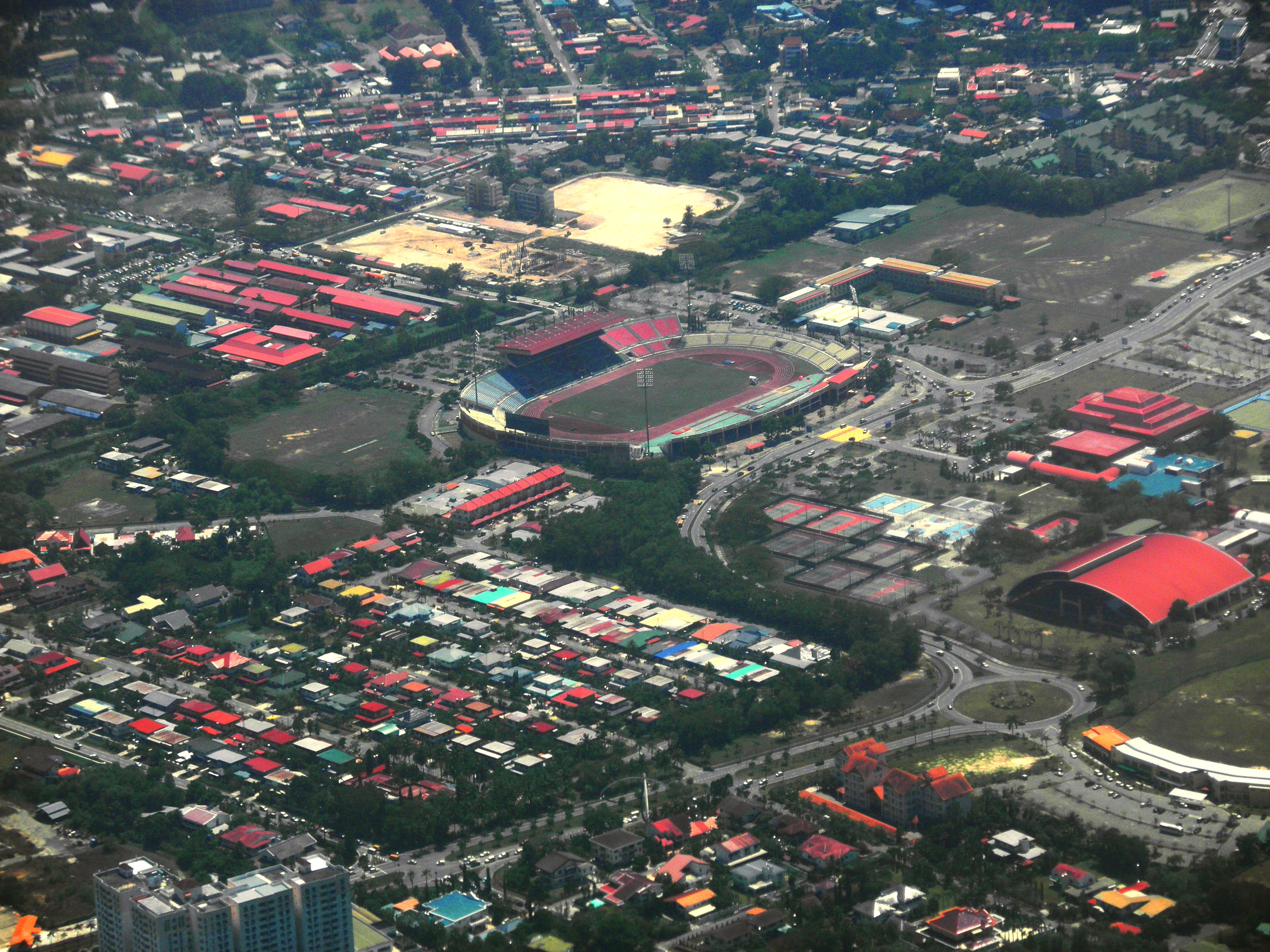
An aerial view of Likas Sport Complex with Likas Stadium, which is the home stadium for Sabah F.C.

The Likas Sports Complex in Kota Kinabalu provides various sporting and recreational facilities for public use. It has, among others, a 20,000-seater football (soccer) stadium, badminton, tennis, and squash courts, a gymnasium, an Olympic size swimming pool, a driving range, hockey fields and a new Youth Challenge park consisting of an international standard skate park and indoor climbing centre. It is the largest sports complex in the state and has hosted numerous national as well as international sporting events. Likas Stadium is the home stadium of Sabah F.C., also known as SabaHawks. There is another sports complex in Penampang which also has a full-sized football stadium.

There are four golf courses in Kota Kinabalu, namely the Sabah Golf and Country Club in Bukit Padang, Kinabalu Golf Club in Tanjung Aru, Sutera Harbour Golf and Country Club, and Karambunai Golf and Country Club.

Kota Kinabalu has hosted a number of national sporting events such as the 2002 Sukma Games, international tournaments such as the 1994 Karate World Championships and the 2008 BWF Super Series Masters Finals badminton tournament. It is also the starting point of the annual international Borneo Safari 4x4 Challenge. Kota Kinabalu has been one of the circuits for the F2 Powerboat UIM World Cup Series in December every year since 2007.

=== Music ===
Kota Kinabalu is home to one of Asia's favourite jazz festivals, the KK Jazz Festival. It has become an annual event. International performers such as Son2nos (Venezuela), award-winning Korean jazz diva Nah Youn Sun, Hong Kong's Junk Unit, Malaysia's Double Take, Atilia and Mood Indigo from UK have all previously performed at the festival. Coinciding with UNESCO's International Jazz Day celebrations in 2019, the year marks the inauguration of Sabah Jazz in Kota Kinabalu with the showcases of local jazz artists as well as from the region. Among those who performed include Grupo Da Bossa, Gordon Horace Chin, Hady Afro, Joe Balanjiu Jr and La Sambusa Latina from Argentina. Sabah Jazz is set to be held annually.

BandWidth Street Press Magazine is Kota Kinabalu's only free monthly magazine that promotes local Sabah music. The magazine was launched in March 2009, and was supported by the local government and was referred by Sabah's Minister of Culture, Environment & Tourism, YB Datuk Masidi Manjun, as a publication that will introduce and promote new local musicians while serving up the latest information on the local entertainment scene.

== International relations ==
Several countries have set up their consulates in Kota Kinabalu, including Australia, Brunei, China, Czech Republic, Denmark, France, Finland, Indonesia, Japan, Norway, Panama, Romania, Slovakia, South Korea, Spain, Sweden and the United Kingdom. In 2018, Russia set up their branch office of the Russian Centre of Science and Culture (RCSC) to expand the existing co-operation between Malaysia and Russia in the culture, economic and education spheres.

=== Sister cities ===
Kota Kinabalu's sister cities are:

- Balikpapan, Indonesia
- Hangzhou, China
- Heyuan, China
- Jiangmen, China
- Ratchaburi, Thailand
- Vladivostok, Russia
- Yeosu, South Korea
- Yongin, South Korea

=== Cooperation and friendship ===
Kota Kinabalu also cooperates with:

- Rockingham, Australia
- Wuhan, China
- Xi'an, China

== Notable people ==
- Penny Wong (b. 1968) - Australian Foreign Minister.

== See also ==
- Archdiocese of Kota Kinabalu
- Greater Kota Kinabalu
- List of tallest buildings in Kota Kinabalu
- The Skybridge City Centre Kota Kinabalu
- Anjung Kinabalu
