= Maktab Nasional =

- (National College)

Location
- Taman Kingfisher Park II, Kg. Bangka-Bangka Kuala Inanam, Likas, Kota Kinabalu, Sabah, 88800; Malaysia

Information
- School type: Private Catholic secondary school
- Motto: Luceat Lux Vestra (Let Your Light Shine)
- Religious affiliation: Roman Catholic
- Established: 1985
- Founder: Bishop Simon Michael Fung Kui Heong, PGDK
- Status: Open
- Authority: Kota Kinabalu District Education Office
- Oversight: Roman Catholic Archdiocese of Kota Kinabalu
- Principal: Marie Yong Pik Hua
- Grades: Form 1 to Form 5
- Language: Malay, English, Chinese
- Houses: Red Ferrari; Blue Porsche; Yellow Lamborghini
- Website: stsimon.edu.my/mn

Maktab Nasional (National College in English) is a private Catholic mission secondary school located in Likas, Kota Kinabalu, Sabah under the jurisdiction of the Archdiocese of Kota Kinabalu.

It was founded as a Catholic mission school in 1985 under the auspices of the Archdiocese of Kota Kinabalu as well as the Sacred Heart Cathedral parish and is a member school of the St Simon Educational Complex as well as the family of schools under the Sacred Heart Cathedral parish (together with its kindergarten and primary sections of Taska & Tadika Datuk Simon Fung as well as SRS Datuk Simon Fung) along with SK Sacred Heart, Karamunsing, SM St. Francis Convent, Bukit Padang, Tadika St. Francis, Karamunsing, Tadika Shan Tao, Karamunsing, SK St. Francis Convent, Bukit Padang, SM La Salle, Tanjung Aru and SJK (C) Shan Tao, Kepayan Ridge.

It is noted as the only privately owned Roman Catholic mission school in the state.

== History ==
The school was founded in 1985 and was located at the present St Peter's College Initiation Year campus in Karamunsing, Kota Kinabalu.

Then, a group of new buildings were built in Jalan Istiadat, Likas in 1988 to form its daughter primary school which was later to be known as SRS Datuk Simon Fung, in honour of the late Bishop Datuk Simon Fung of the-then diocese (now Archdiocese) of Kota Kinabalu.

With the tragic loss of the old primary school block in 1993 at the Jalan Istiadat premises, the schools moved to the present location at Kingfisher Park, Likas, where it took another two years until 1995 to form the Kompleks Pendidikan St. Simon (St. Simon Educational Complex) together with the kindergarten and pre-school section known as Taska & Tadika Datuk Simon Fung that has been established since 1990.

== Internal structure ==
The school offers the Malaysian public examinations, PT3 and SPM and also the IGCSE international examinations for selected students.

As it is a Catholic secondary school under the auspices of the Sacred Heart Cathedral parish, along with other fellow Catholic mission schools under the parish's care (including the school's kindergarten and primary daughter schools) such as SK Sacred Heart, Karamunsing, SM St. Francis Convent, Bukit Padang, Tadika St. Francis, Karamunsing, SK St. Francis Convent, Bukit Padang, Tadika Shan Tao, Karamunsing, SM La Salle, Tanjung Aru and SJK (C) Shan Tao, Kepayan Ridge, the school's supervisor is the incumbent rector of Sacred Heart Cathedral, Kota Kinabalu, held by the Rev Msgr Nicholas Stephen Juki Tinsung Moujing, a native of both Penampang (paternal) as well as Tambunan (maternal) districts.

The current chaplain is Rev Mattheus Augustine Luta, a native of Penampang since October 2022 (by which he is also concurrently the school's ex-officio board of governors' member representing the clergy quota) in which he succeeded Rev Wilfred Petrus Atin, a native of Ranau who is also the current rector of St. Michael's Church, Penampang since 2017.

Its current principal is Mdm Marie Yong Pik Hua, who took over from the only alumnus to serve in the similar post, Dr Alexander Funk Yun Leong in 2019 after his tenure contract ended for the past six years since 2013.

== Co-curricular activities ==
=== Musical theatre productions done by the school ===
The school staged the first ever musical theater in Sabah with the production of “The King and I” in 1985, The school has also produced stage performances that included “The Variety Show Concert” (1987), “The Wizard of Oz” (1992), “What A Friend Is” (1997), “My Fair Lady” (2002), “Beauty and the Beast” (2005), “Summer Camp High” (2010) and Crazy Dreams (2013) and "Meant To Be" (2016).

== Notable alumni ==
- Phil Wang, world renowned stand-up comedian, comedy writer and presenter.
- Roger Wang, award-winning Malaysian composer and acoustic guitarist.
