= Archdiocese of Kota Kinabalu =

Latin Catholic archdiocese in Malaysia

Archdiocese of Kota Kinabalu Archidioecesis Kota Kinabaluensis Keuskupan Agung Kota Kinabalu 哥打京那巴鲁总教区

Catholic
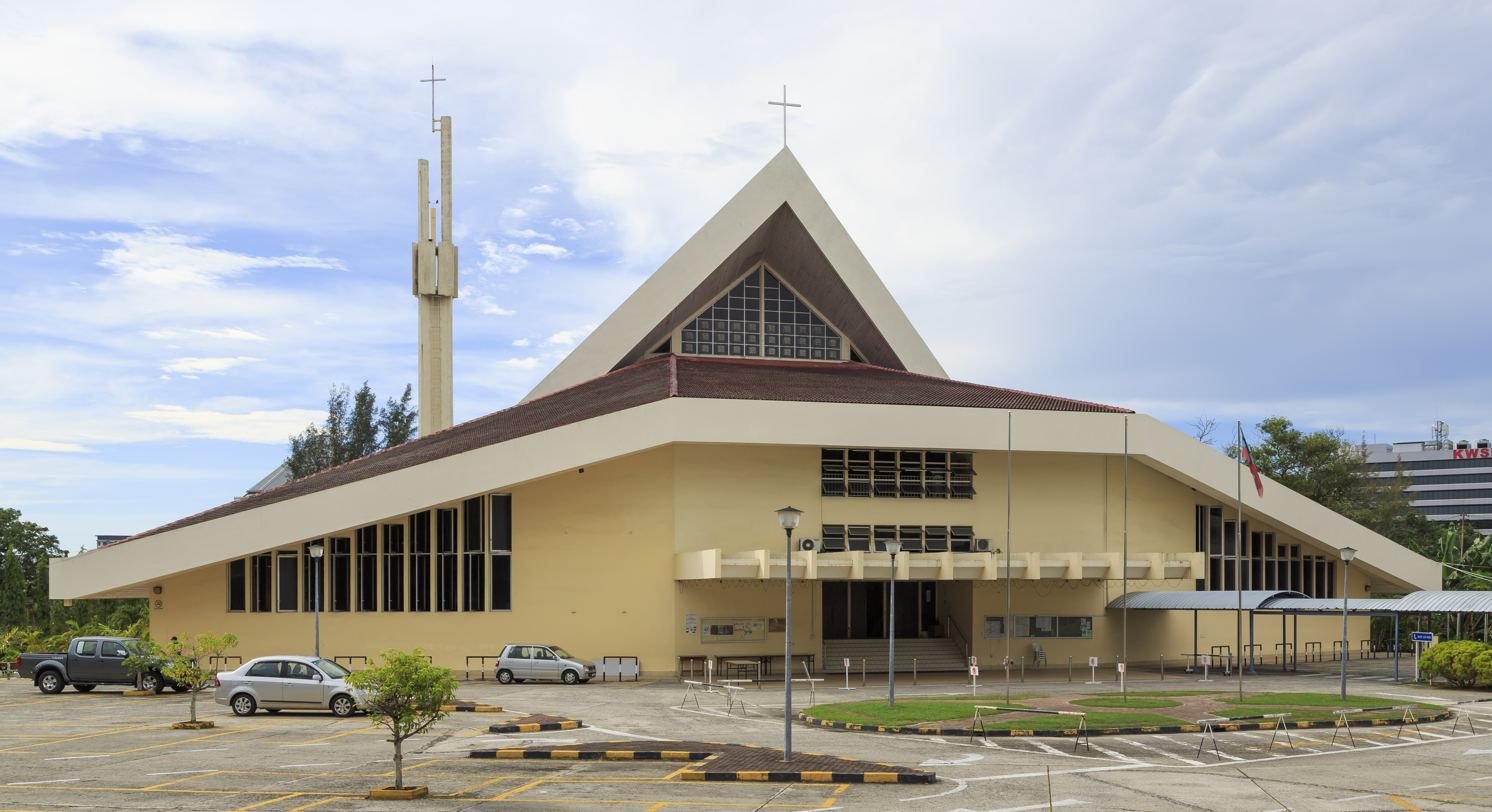
- Sacred Heart Cathedral, Kota Kinabalu

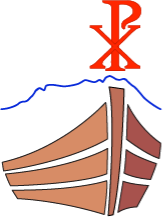
- Coat of arms

Location
- Country: Malaysia
- Territory: Kota Kinabalu, Penampang, Ranau, Tuaran, Papar, Kota Belud, Kudat, Kota Marudu, Pitas and Federal Territory of Labuan
- Episcopal conference: Catholic Bishops' Conference of Malaysia, Singapore and Brunei
- Ecclesiastical province: Kota Kinabalu
- Coordinates: 5°57′52.53″N 116°4′20.87″E

Statistics
- Area: 55,215 km^{2} (21,319 sq mi)
- Population: Total; Catholics: (as of 2024); 1,877,817; 250,255 (7.50%)
- Parishes: 23

Information
- Denomination: Catholic Church
- Sui iuris church: Latin Church
- Rite: Roman Rite
- Established: 1976, 2008
- Cathedral: Sacred Heart Cathedral
- Patron saint: St. Joseph
- Secular priests: 43
- Language: Ecclesiastical Latin; English language Malay language Hakka language Mandarin language Rungus language Kadazan language Dusun language Korean language

Current leadership
- Pope: Leo XIV
- Metropolitan Archbishop: John Wong Soo Kau
- Suffragans: Diocese of Keningau; Diocese of Sandakan
- Vicar General: Nicholas Stephen Juki Tinsung
- Bishops emeritus: John Lee Hiong Fun-Yit Yaw

Website
- catholicadkk.org

Seal of incumbent archbishop, John Wong Soo Kau

The Archdiocese of Kota Kinabalu (Latin language: Archdioecesis Kotakinabaluensis; Malay: Keuskupan Agung Kota Kinabalu; Mandarin: 哥打京那巴鲁总教区) is a metropolitan archdiocese of the Latin Church of the Catholic Church in Sabah, Malaysia, on the island of Borneo. The archdiocese is the oldest ecclesiastical territory in Malaysia, with a long history slowly rising along with the Catholic population from a prefecture to an archdiocese. Its cathedral archepiscopal see is Sacred Heart Cathedral, Kota Kinabalu. The patron saint of the archdiocese is St. Joseph, Spouse of the Blessed Virgin Mary.

== History ==
Originally erected on 4 September 1855 as the Apostolic prefecture of Labuan and Borneo, created on territory split off from the then Apostolic Vicariate of Batavia (Java) (including the neighbouring Dutch East Indies).

On 5 February 1927 it was renamed the Apostolic Prefecture of Northern Borneo, and lost territory to form the Apostolic Prefecture of Sarawak (now Dioceses of Kuching, Sibu and Miri).

On 14 February 1952 the prefecture was promoted to Apostolic Vicariate of Jesselton, hence entitled to a titular bishop. On 22 March 1962 its name was changed once more to the Apostolic Vicariate of Kota Kinabalu, after its see.

On 31 May 1976 the vicariate was elevated to a full Diocese of Kota Kinabalu, suffragan in the ecclesiastical province of the Metropolitan Archdiocese of Kuching.

The diocese lost territories twice, to create its present suffragans :

- on 17 December 1992 the diocese the Diocese of Keningau with the appointment of Cornelius Piong.
- on 16 July 2007 the Diocese of Sandakan with the appointment of Julius Dusin Gitom.

On 23 May 2008, by the papal bull "Cum Ecclesia Catholica", the diocese was elevated to Metropolitan Archdiocese, whose ecclesiastical province comprises the above suffragan dioceses, both formerly part of the original territory of the diocese of Kota Kinabalu: the Dioceses of Keningau and Sandakan.

On 21 June 2010, Pope Benedict XVI appointed John Wong Soo Kau, director of the aspirants' formation house in Kota Kinabalu, as Coadjutor Archbishop of Kota Kinabalu. His ordination took place on 1 October 2010 and was installed as the second and current Archbishop of this diocese in 2013. His predecessor, John Lee Hiong Fun-Yit Yaw, has been served as the first Archbishop from 1987 to his retirement on 1 December 2012.

== Prelates ==
=== Apostolic prefects of Labuan and Borneo ===
No.	Portrait	Name	From	Until	Insignia
1	Monseñor Carlos Cuarteroni - La Ilustración Española y Americana 1880	Don Carlos Cuarteroni (1816-1880)	23 August 1855	March 1879	

=== Apostolic prefects of Labuan and Northern Borneo ===
No.	Portrait	Name	From	Until	Insignia
1		Thomas Jackson, MHM (1846-1916)	18 July 1881	20 October 1895	
2		Edmund Dunn, MHM (1857-1933)	4 May 1897	5 February 1927	

=== Apostolic prefects of Northern Borneo ===
No.	Portrait	Name	From	Until	Insignia
1		August Wachter, MHM (1878-1945)	26 July 1927	6 August 1945	
2		James Buis, MHM (1902-1980)	18 January 1947	14 February 1952	

=== Apostolic vicars of Jesselton/Kota Kinabalu ===
No.	Portrait	Name	From	Until	Insignia
1		James Buis, MHM (1902-1980)	1 May 1952	1 August 1972	
2		Peter Chung Hoan Ting (born 1928)	15 November 1970	31 May 1975	
3		Simon Michael Fung Kui Heong (1931-1985)	29 August 1975	31 May 1976	

=== Bishops of Kota Kinabalu ===
No.	Portrait	Name	From	Until	Insignia
1		Simon Michael Fung Kui Heong (1931-1985)	31 May 1976	16 November 1985 (Died)	
2		John Lee Hiong Fun-Yit Yaw (born 1933)	26 June 1987	23 May 2008	

=== Archbishops of Kota Kinabalu ===
No.	Portrait	Name	From	Until	Insignia
1		John Lee Hiong Fun-Yit Yaw (born 1933)	23 May 2008	25 January 2013 (Resigned)	
2		John Wong Soo Kau (born 1969)	26 January 2013	Present	

== Clergy ==
=== College of Consultors ===
==== President ====
- (Sabah) Most Rev Datuk John Wong Soo Kau DD, Archbishop

==== Vicar General ====
- (Sabah) Rev Msgr Nicholas Stephen Juki Tinsung Moujing

==== Diocesan Chancellor ====
- (Sabah) Rev Wilfred Petrus Atin

==== Clergy Members ====
- (Sabah) Rev Paul Lo Chee Khong
- (Sabah) Rev Sunny Chung
- (Sabah) Rev Rhobby Mojolou
- (Sabah) Rev Matheus Luta

=== Retired Clergy ===
- (Sabah) Most Rev Archbishop Emeritus Datuk John Lee Hiong Fun-Yit Yaw (First Archbishop, 1976–2013)
- (Sabah) Rev Datuk Primus Jouil (Vicar General Emeritus)
- (Sabah) Rev Datuk Felix Chung Chi Lok
- (Sabah) Rev Francis Tsen
- (Sabah) Rev Cosmas Lee Khod Min

=== Transitional Deacons ===
- (Sabah) Deacon Tony Bingkuan, OFM Cap
- (Sabah) Deacon Yoseph Jup Matias

=== Diocesan Seminarians / Friars ===
- (Sabah) Friar Joshua Yong, OFM Cap

=== Diocesan Priests ===
- (Sabah) Rev Aloysius Fidelis
- (Sabah) Rev Ambrose Michael Atang
- (Sabah) Rev Bradley Belly Stephen
- (Sabah) Rev Canisius Benjamin Santee
- (Sabah) Rev Daniel Jomilong
- (Sabah) Rev David Sham
- (Sabah) Rev Florian Marcus Dompok
- (Sabah) Rev Frederick Raymond Misius
- (Sabah) Rev Gilbert Marcus Dompok
- (Sabah) Rev Isidore Gilbert Gondilou
- (Sabah) Rev Jack Johimi Sigam
- (Sabah) Rev Jalius Sading
- (Sabah) Rev Jeffri Gumu
- (Sabah) Rev Jerry Joseph Muhamat
- (Sabah) Rev Johnny Raju
- (Sabah) Rev Joshua Liew Chi Kiong
- (Sabah) Rev Maximillianno Benhor Hontor
- (Sabah) Rev Michael John Modoit
- (Sabah) Rev Patrick Erik Jerome
- (Sabah) Rev Peter Chung Pit Soon
- (Sabah) Rev Dr. Peter Nicholas Abas
- (Sabah) Rev Postinus Fidelis Kurup
- (Sabah) Rev Rayner Bisius
- (Sabah) Rev Saimon William Shen (Outstationed from Diocese of Keningau)
- (Sabah) Rev Sylvester Wong Vun Cheong
- (Sabah) Rev Thomas Madanan
- Rev Thomas Yip Wee Tsung (Outstationed from Diocese of Penang)
- (Sabah) Rev William Poilis
- (Sabah) Rev Wilson Francis Bandaran
- (Sabah) Rev Zeno Lasius Gantis

=== Religious Priests ===
- (Sabah) Rev Columba Wennidy (Ned Dousia) Moujing, OSB
- (Sabah) Rev Cruzender Alex, OFM
- (Sabah) Rev Gerald Terence Saimel, OFM
- (Sabah) Rev Joseph Fung, SJ
- Rev Lawrence Kim Jin-su, SST (Mirinae Missionary from South Korea)
- Rev Moses Yap Poh Sing, OFM (Outstationed from Diocese of Malacca-Johor)

=== On Mission / On Study Leave ===
- (Sabah) Rev Abel Madisang
- (Sabah) Rev Aiden Peter Jr, OFM
- (Sabah) Rev Benedict Daulis Runsab
- (Sabah) Rev Claurence Motoyou, OFM
- (Sabah) Rev Cosmas Francis Yasun, OFM
- (Sabah) Rev Crispus Mosinoh, OFM
- (Sabah) Rev Cristiano James Willie Sumbat, MHM
- (Sabah) Rev Don Don Romero Ramerez, OFM
- (Sabah) Rev Edward Raymond Misius
- (Sabah) Rev Elvost Lunchi, MHM
- (Sabah) Rev Gilbert James Augustine Janggul, OFM Cap
- (Sabah) Rev Giovanni Chrysostomus Sugau, CSE
- (Sabah) Rev Herman Menjuan, MHM
- (Sabah) Rev Leslie Joseph Bingkasan, SJ
- (Sabah) Rev Mitchelly Kiun Solidau
- (Sabah) Rev Nalerin Erone Nahfirin, SJ (Outstationed from Diocese of Keningau)
- (Sabah) Rev Robin Lormangkok, CSsR
- (Sabah) Rev Russell Lawrine Samin
- (Sabah) Rev Sixtus Pitah Amit, OFM
- (Sabah) Rev Terans Thadeus John Dunggi
- (Sabah) Rev Tony Gideon Mojiwat
- (Sabah) Rev Brother Allan Kosidi
- (Sabah) Rev Brother Markarthur Steve Bailon
- (Sabah) Rev Brother Matthew Lo Nam Yee
- (Sabah) Rev Brother Mejoery Simon
- (Sabah) Rev Brother Owen Victor Valerian
- (Sabah) Rev Brother Peter Langgayang, OFM Cap

== List of parishes ==
As of 2023, there are 23 parishes across 4 deaneries including various sub-parishes and 229 outstations found in the Catholic Archdiocese of Kota Kinabalu.

- Kota Kinabalu City Deanery (8 parishes)
- Sacred Heart Cathedral Parish, Karamunsing, Kota Kinabalu
  - sub-parish of Carmelite Monastery Chapel, Karamunsing, Kota Kinabalu
- St Simon the Zealot's Parish, Likas, Kota Kinabalu

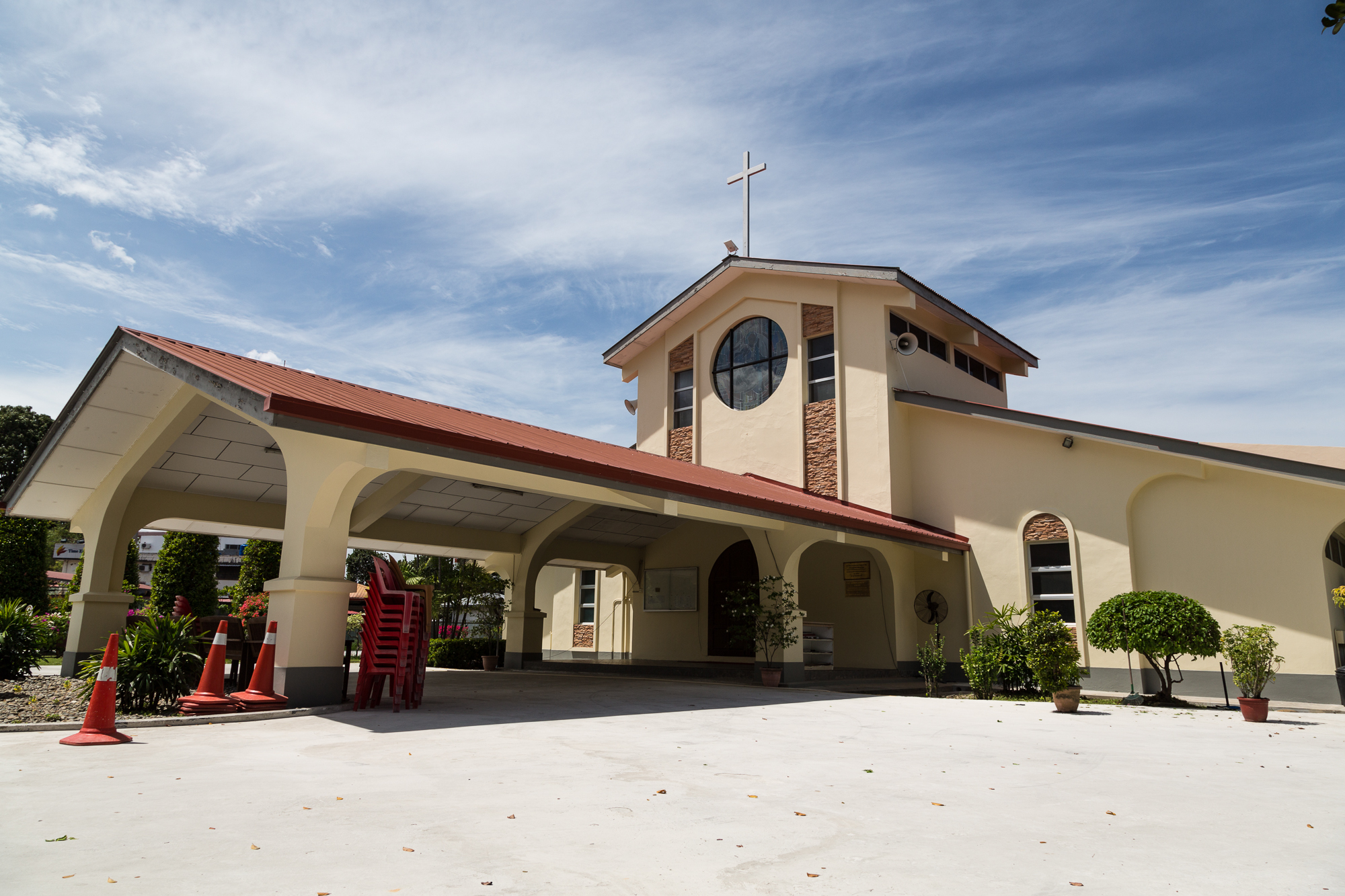
Church of St Simon in Likas

- Church of Mary Immaculate Parish, Bukit Padang, Luyang, Kota Kinabalu

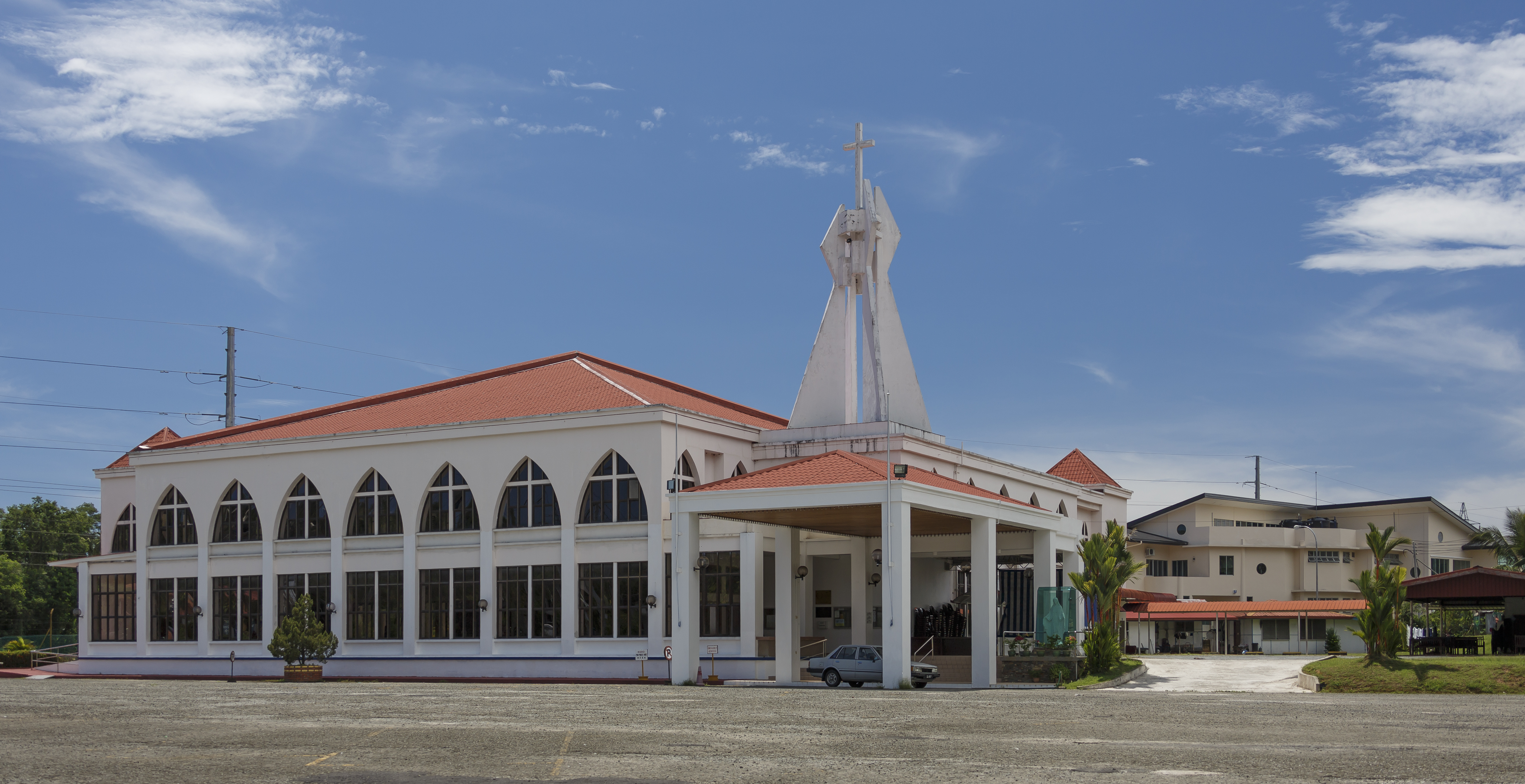
Church of Mary Immaculate in Bukit Padang

- Stella Maris Parish, Tanjung Aru, Kota Kinabalu
  - sub-parish of St Catherine Laboure's Church Imbaan, Putatan, Penampang
- St. Thomas More's Parish, Kepayan, Kota Kinabalu
  - sub-parish of St John's Chapel, Kopungit, Kepayan, Kota Kinabalu
- St. Catherine of Siena's Parish, Inanam, Kota Kinabalu
  - sub-parishes of St. Teresa de Avila's Church, Bantayan/Pangasaan, Inanam, Kota Kinabalu
  - St Simon's Church, Pulau Penampang, Manggatal, Kota Kinabalu
  - St Victor's Church, Bambangan, Inanam, Kota Kinabalu
  - St Paul's Church, Kionsom Kecil, Inanam, Kota Kinabalu
  - St. Felicianus' Church, Kitobu/Kawakaan, Inanam, Kota Kinabalu
  - St Mary's Church, Kionsom, Inanam, Kota Kinabalu
  - St Patrick's Church, Kiambalang, Inanam, Kota Kinabalu and
  - St Augustine of Hippo Church, Babagon Toki, Inanam, Kota Kinabalu
- Good Shepherd's Parish, Manggatal, Kota Kinabalu

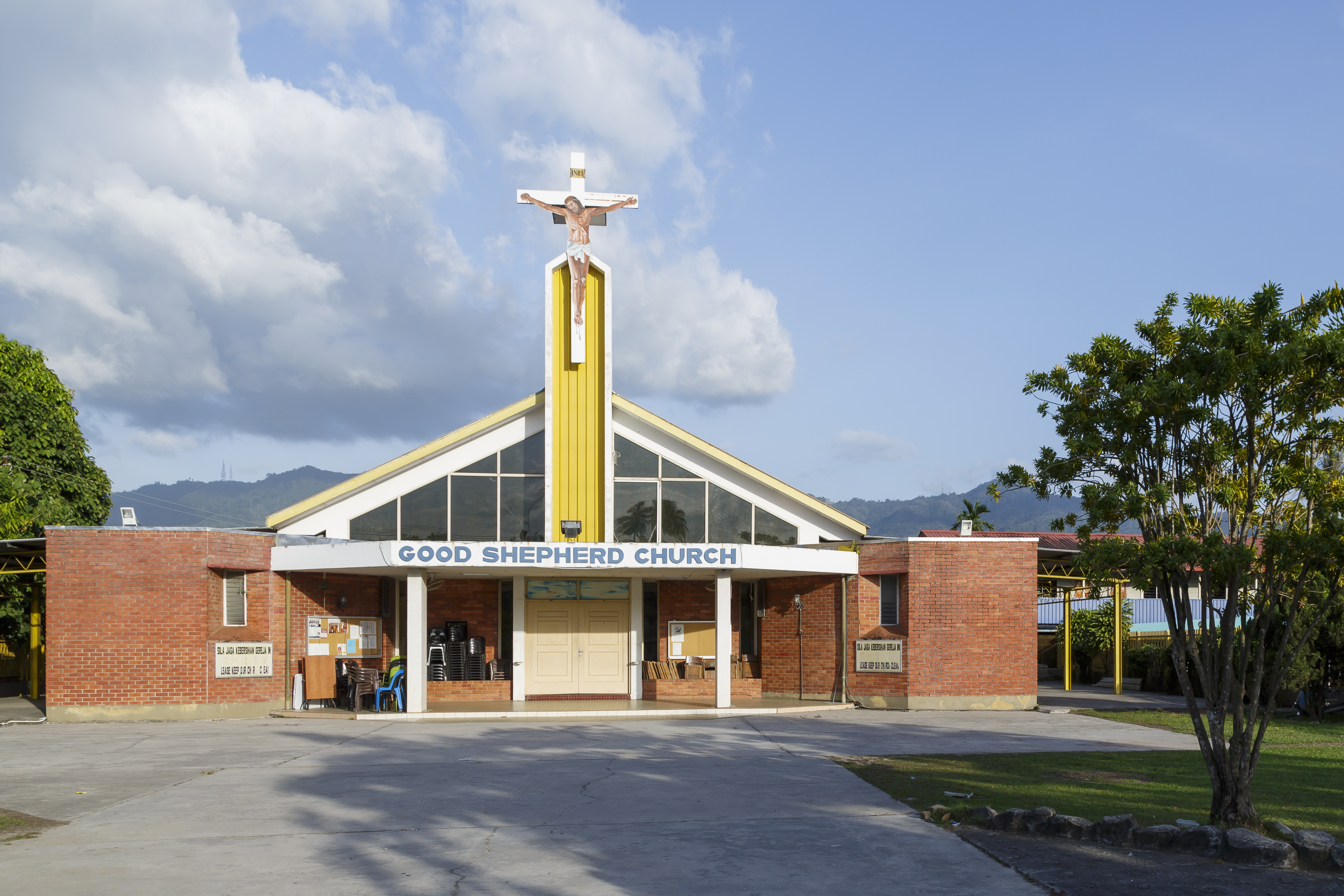
Church of Good Shepherd, Manggatal

  - sub-parishes of St James' Church, Bongkud, Manggatal, Kota Kinabalu
  - St Jacob's Church, Tombongon, Manggatal, Kota Kinabalu
  - St Joseph's Church, Kokol, Manggatal, Kota Kinabalu
  - St Luke the Evangelist Church, Naalap, Kokol, Manggatal, Kota Kinabalu
  - Our Lady Star of the Sea Church, Togung, Manggatal, Kota Kinabalu
  - Our Lady of Mount Carmel Church, Binaung Baru, Manggatal, Kota Kinabalu and
  - St Stephen's Church, Keliangau, Manggatal, Kota Kinabalu
- Holy Family Parish, Telipok, Kota Kinabalu
  - sub-parishes of Church of the Divine Mercy, Malawa, KKIP Sepanggar, Manggatal, Kota Kinabalu (formerly Our Lady of Fatima Church, Malawa, KKIP Sepanggar, Manggatal)
  - St Flora's Church, Lapasan, Telipok, Kota Kinabalu
  - St Mary Magdalene's Church, Kayu Madang, Telipok, Kota Kinabalu
  - St Peter's Church, Tampulan, Telipok, Kota Kinabalu
  - St Anne's Church, Lawa Mondou, Telipok, Kota Kinabalu
  - St Lazarus' Church, Natai, Telipok, Kota Kinabalu
  - St Irenaeus' Church, Natai Siba, Telipok, Kota Kinabalu and
  - St Francis Xavier's Church, Bunsut, Telipok, Kota Kinabalu
- North West Coast Division Deanery (5 parishes)
- St. John the Evangelist's Parish, Labuaya, Tuaran
- Central/Tamparuli Zone
  - St Philip the Apostle's Church/St. Veronica's Chapel on the Hill (Station of the Cross site), Kiansom, Tamparuli
  - St Anthony's Church, Kauluan, Tamparuli, Tuaran
  - St Simon's Church, Tambalaung, Tamparuli, Tuaran
  - St Faustina Kowalska's Church, Rambai, Tamparuli (formerly St Luke the Evangelist, Rambai)
  - St Joseph the Worker Church, Guakon, Tamparuli
  - St Sebastian's Church, Bukit Giling, Telipok, Kota Kinabalu
  - St Anthony of Padua's Church, Bundung, Topokon, Tuaran
  - St Joan of Arc's Church, Logkou, Tamparuli, Tuaran
  - St Paul's Church, Logub, Tamparuli, Tuaran
  - St Padre Pio of Pietrelcina's Church, Sawah, Tamparuli (formerly St Thomas the Apostle's Church, Sawah)
  - St Theresa Avilla's Church, Tongkurangoh, Tamparuli
  - St Julius' Church, Bambangan Baru, Tuaran
  - St Patrick's Church, Bundu Tohuri, Tuaran
  - St Henry's Church, Kelawat, Tamparuli, Tuaran
  - St Vicnent de Paul's Church Kibambangan, Bundu Gulu, Bundu Tohuri, Tuaran (formerly St Julius' Church, Kibambangan, Bundu Tohuri)
- Koporingan Zone
  - St Clare of Assisi's Church, Koporingan, Tamparuli
  - St Stephen's Church, Kotunuan Baru, Tamparuli (formerly St Joseph's Church, Kotunuan Baru)
  - St Martha of Bethany's Church, Loputung, Tamparuli
  - St Juliana of Nicomedia's Church, Kapa, Tamparuli
  - St Francis of Assisi's Church, Minangkob, Tamparuli
  - St Cornelius the Pope's Church, Moingob, Tamparuli
  - St Ignatius of Loyola Church, Puhus, Tamparuli (formerly St. Mary's Church, Puhus)
  - St Anna's Church, Ruhiang, Tamparuli
  - St Matthew the Apostle's Church, Bambangan Lama, Tamparuli
  - St Paul's Church, Sinalapak, Tamparuli
  - St Louis' Church, Tiong-Tiong, Tamparuli
  - St Catherine of Siena's Church, Tomis Baru, Tamparuli (formerly St Mary's Church, Tomis Baru)
  - Our Lady of Fatima Church, Bundu Rikos, Tamparuli
  - St Paul Miki Church, Togop, Tampauli
- Tenghilan Zone
  - St James' Church, Tenghilan
  - St Cecilia's Church, Gumoron, Tenghilan
  - St Hillary of Poitiers' Church, Ponopuan, Tenghilan
  - St Peter's Church, Koburan, Tenghilan
  - Our Lady of the Rosary Church, Lapai, Tenghilan (formerly Holy Rosary, Lapai)
  - St Jane Frances de Chantal's Church, Gumoron Siba, Tenghilan
  - St Theresa of Lisieux's Church, Linsuk, Tenghilan
  - St Monica's Church, Gumoron Sokid, Tenghilan
  - St Mary's Church, Mesilou, Tenghilan
  - St Francis' Church, Monggis, Tenghilan
  - St Mark the Evangelist's Church, Napitas/Rasuna/Suromboton, Tenghilan
  - St John's Church, Tinuhan, Tenghilan
  - St Maria Goretti's Church, Molisou/Saradan, Tenghilan
- Topokon Zone
  - St Mary Mother of God Church, Topokon, Tuaran
  - St John's Church, Madang, Tuaran (formerly St Joseph's Church, Madang)
  - St Peter's Church, Lapasan, Tenghilan
  - St Theresa's Church, Toboh Baru, Tamparuli
  - Holy Cross Church, Rungus, Tamparuli (formerly St Michael the Archangel's Church, Rungus)
  - St Pedro Calungsod's Church, Pitas, Tuaran
  - St Veronica of Binasco Church, Timbou, Tuaran
  - St Benedict Abbot's Church, Wangkod, Tuaran
  - St Dominic Savio's Church, Gontung, Tuaran
- Former zone: Pukak Zone (abolished; merged with parish of St. Joseph the Husband of Mary, Kiulu, Tuaran)
- St. Edmund the Martyr's Parish, Kota Belud
- Central Zone
  - St. Flora's Church, Lasau Tintapon/Minunsud/Luba, Kota Belud
  - St. William's Church, Tempasuk I, Kota Belud
- Kelawat Zone
  - St. Thomas' Church, Kelawat, Kota Belud
  - St. Raphael the Archangel's Church, Pompod, Kelawat, Kota Belud
  - St. Anthony of Padua's Church, Pituru, Kota Belud
  - St. John Mary Vianney's Church, Tolus, Kota Belud
  - St. Francis of Assisi's Church, Mandap, Kota Belud
- Tambulion Zone
  - St. Dominic's Church, Tambulion, Kota Belud
  - St. Cecilia's Church, Piasau, Kota Belud
  - St. John of the Cross Church, Lasau Gonok, Kota Belud
  - St. Theresa's Church, Ginapas/Kalibungan, Kota Belud
  - Mary Queen of Heaven Church, Bangkahak Lama, Kota Belud
  - St. Andrew's Church, Gintuong/Bugaron, Kota Belud
  - St. Matthew the Apostle's Church, Rantai Rosok, Kota Belud
  - St. Paul's Church, Bangkahak Baru, Kota Belud
  - St. Francis Xavier's Church, Bangkahak Sunsum, Kota Belud
  - St. Hillary of Poitiers' Church, Timbang, Kota Belud
  - St. Benedict of Nursia's Church, Taburan, Kota Belud
  - St. Joseph's Church, Mantanau, Kota Belud
  - Holy Cross Church, Sarang/Dudar, Kota Belud
  - St. Alphonsus Liguori's Church, Ulu Kukut, Mangaris, Kota Belud
  - St. Teresa of Avila's Church, Bongaliu, Kota Belud
  - St. Augustine of Hippo's Church, Tempasuk II, Kota Belud
- Purak Ogis Zone
  - St. William's Church, Purak Ogis, Kota Belud
  - St. Catherine's Church, Kebayau, Kota Belud
  - St. Nancy's Church, Melangkap, Kota Belud
  - St. Martin's Church, Sogoh/Narinang, Kota Belud
  - St. Anastasia's Church, Ratau, Kota Belud
  - St Joseph's Church, Taginambur, Kota Belud
- St. Peter Claver's Parish, Ranau

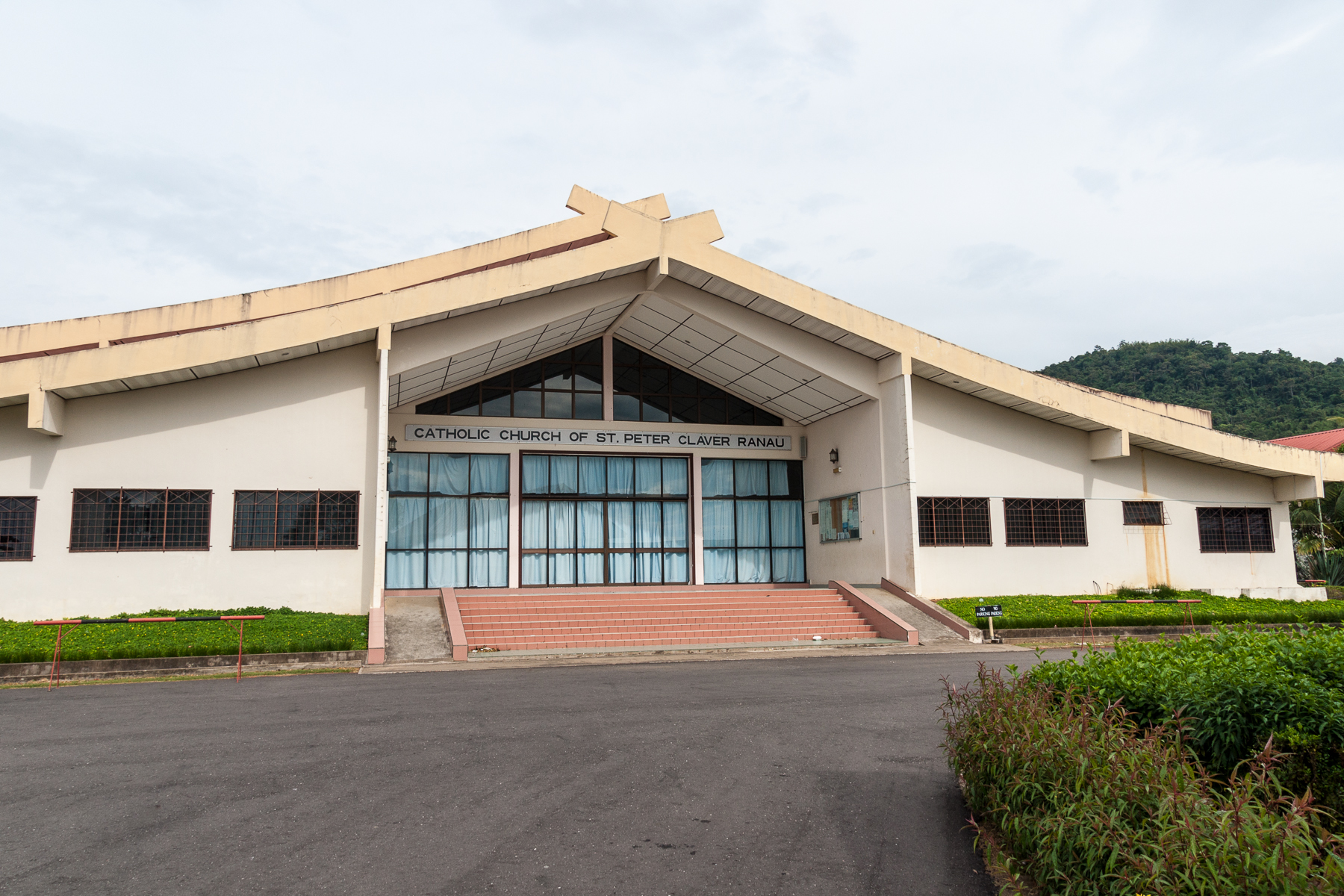
St Peter Claver's Church in Ranau

- Central Zone
  - St Sebastian's Church, Marakau, Ranau
  - St Charles Borromeo's Church, Kandawayon, Ranau
  - St Bede's Church, Kokob, Ranau
  - Puncak Kasih Bonda (Mary Mother of Mercy) Church, Tudangan, Ranau
  - St Jude's Church, Maukab/Komburongoh, Ranau
  - St Joan of Arc's Church, Longut, Ranau
  - St Maria Goretti's Church, Tiang Lama, Ranau
  - St Fridolin of Sackingen's Church, Gaur, Ranau
  - Chapel of Our Lady of the Church, Kilimu, Ranau
- Poring/Bongkud Zone
  - St Victor's Church, Bongkud/Poring, Ranau
  - St Jerome of Bethlehem's Church, Lutut, Ranau
  - St Dominic Savio's Church, Langsat/Kirokot, Ranau
  - St Geoffrey of Clairvaux's Church, Waluhu, Ranau
  - St Cornelius's Church Kinasaraban Baru, Lohan, Ranau
  - St Joseph Husband of Mary's Church, Nopung, Ranau
  - St Martin de Porres' Church, Singgaron Baru, Ranau
  - Our Lady of Fatima Church, Kawiyan, Ranau
- Kibbas/Kundasang Zone
  - St Augustine of Hippo's Church, Kibbas, Ranau
  - St Martha of Bethany's Church Kauluan, Kundasang, Ranau
  - St Padre Pio of Pietrelcina's Church, Sarapong/Manantangah, Ranau
  - St Maria Goretti's Church Ruhukon, Kundasang, Ranau
  - St John of the Cross' Church Tambiau, Kundasang, Ranau
  - St Paul's Church, Toboh Baru, Ranau
  - St Juan Diego's Church Kiwawoi, Kundasang, Ranau
- Paginatan Zone
  - St Peter the Apostle's Church, Paginatan, Ranau
  - St Fidelis of Sigmaringen's Church, Lungkidau, Ranau
  - St Patrick's Church, Soborong, Ranau
  - St Francis Xavier's Church, Sagindai, Ranau
  - St Andrew Kim Tae-gon's Church, Matupang, Ranau
- Nalapak Zone
  - St Joseph the Worker's Church, Kebulu, Ranau
  - St Francis of Assisi's Church, Kinaratuan, Ranau
  - St John Paul II's Church, Nalapak, Ranau
  - St Anne's Church, Sedul, Ranau
  - St Bruno's Church, Nabutan, Ranau
- Perancangan Zone
  - St Gabriel the Archangel's Church/Golgotha Hill Catholic Piglrimage Centre, Perancangan, Ranau
  - St Matthew the Apostle's Church, Togop Darat, Ranau
  - St Francis of Paola's Church, Pinawantai, Ranau
  - St Philip Neri's Church, Lobou Baru, Ranau
  - St Pedro Calungsod's Church, Monggis, Ranau
  - St Michael the Archangel's Church, Nalumad, Ranau
  - St. Louis-Marie de Montfort's Church, Lakang, Ranau
- Nunuk Ragang/Bolisuk Zone
  - St Edwin of Northumbria's Church, Maringkan, Ranau
  - St Anthony the Great Church, Toupos, Ranau
  - St Henry's Church, Tompios, Ranau
  - St Anthony of Padua's Church, Nunuk Ragang/Bolisuk, Ranau
  - St Monica de Paula's Church, Bitoon, Ranau
  - St Peter's Church, Walahu/Paus, Ranau
  - St Joseph of Cupertino's Church, Ponulangon, Ranau
  - St Nicholas of Myra's Church, Kigiwit, Ranau
- Lobou/Timbua Zone
  - St David's Church, Timbua, Ranau
  - St Louis-Marie de Montfort's Church, Lobou Lama, Ranau (formerly St Charles Lwanga's Church, Lobou Lama)
  - St Philip Neri's Church, Lobou Baru, Ranau
  - St Stanislaus' Church, Tibabar, Ranau
  - St Theresa of Avila's Church, Tumbalang, Ranau
  - St John's Church, Sumbilingon, Ranau
  - St Vincent de Paul's Church, Kantas, Ranau
  - St Philip the Apostle's Church, Togibang, Ranau
  - Our Lady of the Rosary Church, Karagasan, Ulu Sugut, Ranau (formerly St. Mary's Church, Karagasan)
- St. Joseph the Husband of Mary's Parish, Tombongon, Kiulu, Tuaran (formerly Pukak/Kiulu Zone, St. John the Evangelist's Church, Labuaya, Tuaran)
  - sub-parishes of St Martin's Church, Malanggang, Kiulu
  - St Bruno's Church, Mantaranau, Kiulu
  - St Michael the Archangel's Church, Lokub, Kiulu
  - St Vitus' Church, Poturidong, Kiulu
  - St Agnes' Church, Borombon, Kiulu
  - St Mary's Church, Raganan, Kiulu
  - St James the Apostle's Church, Talungan, Kiulu
  - St Lucy's Church, Rangalau Baru, Kiulu
  - St Francis Xavier Church, Rangalau Lama, Kiulu
  - St Bonaventure's Church, Mongkonihab, Kiulu
  - St Nicholas of Myra's Church, Sinopukan, Kiulu
  - St Thomas the Apostle's Church, Tapatau, Kiulu
  - St Anthony's Church, Rungus Panansawa, Kiulu
  - St John Vianney's Church, Pukak, Kiulu
  - St Agatha's Church, Gonipis Lama, Kiulu
  - St Patricia's Church, Gonipis Baru, Kiulu
  - St Martin's Church, Lingga Baru, Kiulu
  - St Theresa's Church, Kisonit, Kiulu
  - St Elizabeth's Church, Liposu Baru, Kiulu
  - Sts. Peter and Paul Church, Lubok, Kiulu
  - St Philip's Church, Mangkaladom, Kiulu
  - St Timothy's Church, Nulu, Kiulu
  - St Peter's Church, Pinagon, Kiulu
  - St Joseph's Church, Ratau, Kiulu
  - St Michael the Archangel's Church, Rugading, Kiulu
  - St Augustine of Hippo's Church, Sinansag, Kiulu
  - St Andrew's Church, Talantang, Kiulu
  - St Julius' Church Talungan, Tudan, Kiulu
  - St Scholastica's Church, Tiku, Kiulu (formerly St. Joseph's Church, Tiku)
  - St Gabriel the Archangel's Church Ruminding, Ulu Kiansom, Inanam, Kota Kinabalu
  - St Isidore Labrador Church, Kolubaan, Kiulu and
  - St Rita of Cascia Church, Sukang, Kiulu (formerly St. Mary's Church, Sukang)
- St. Pius X Parish, Bundu Tuhan, Ranau
  - sub-parishes of St Michael's Church, Tudan, Kundasang, Ranau,
  - St Bruno's Church, Toboh Lama, Ranau,
  - St Valentine's Church, Himbaan, Kundasang, Ranau,
  - St Patrick's Church, Kiau Teburi, Kota Belud,
  - St Anthony Abbot's Church, Kiau Bersatu, Kota Belud,
  - St Irenaeus of Lyon's Church, Kiau Nuluh, Kota Belud,
  - St Peter's Church, Lobong-Lobong, Kota Belud,
  - St Augustine of Hippo's Church, Kaung, Kota Belud,
  - Rusod Tobitua (Holy Spirit) Church, Tomis Jaya, Kiulu, Tuaran,
  - Holy Cross Church, Tomis Lama, Kiulu, Tuaran,
  - St Anthony of Padua's Church, Tiong Gondohon, Kiulu, Tuaran,
  - St John's Church, Tiong Ratau, Kiulu, Tuaran,
  - St Michael's Church, Turongohon, Kiulu, Tuaran,
  - St Joseph's Church, Tiong Simpodon, Kiulu, Tuaran,
  - St John the Baptist's Church, Tiong Perungusan, Kiulu, Tuaran,
  - St Francis of Assisi's Church, Tiong Temburung, Kiulu, Tuaran,
  - St Bernard's Church, Sinulihan, Kiulu, Tuaran,
  - St Dominic's Church, Lokos, Kiulu, Tuaran,
  - St Joseph's Church, Kotunuon Lama, Kiulu, Tuaran,
  - St Paul's Church Wasai, Himbaan, Ranau,
  - St Philip Neri's Church, Dalas, Pekan Nabalu, Kota Belud,
  - St Theresa's Church, Simpangan, Kota Belud,
  - St Joseph's Church, Nadau/Giok, Kiulu, Tuaran,
  - St Peter's Church, Pahu, Kiulu, Tuaran,
  - St Joseph's Church, Rungus Turongohon, Kiulu, Tuaran,
  - St Bede's Church, Kokobuan/Rungus Nahaba, Tamparuli, Tuaran,
  - St Pius V's Church, Bongol, Tamparuli, Tuaran
  - St Geoffrey's Church, Bontik/Parad, Tamparuli, Tuaran and
  - St Cladius' Church, Kinasaraban, Kundasang, Ranau
- Kudat Division Deanery (2 parishes)
- St. Theresa's Parish, Kota Marudu

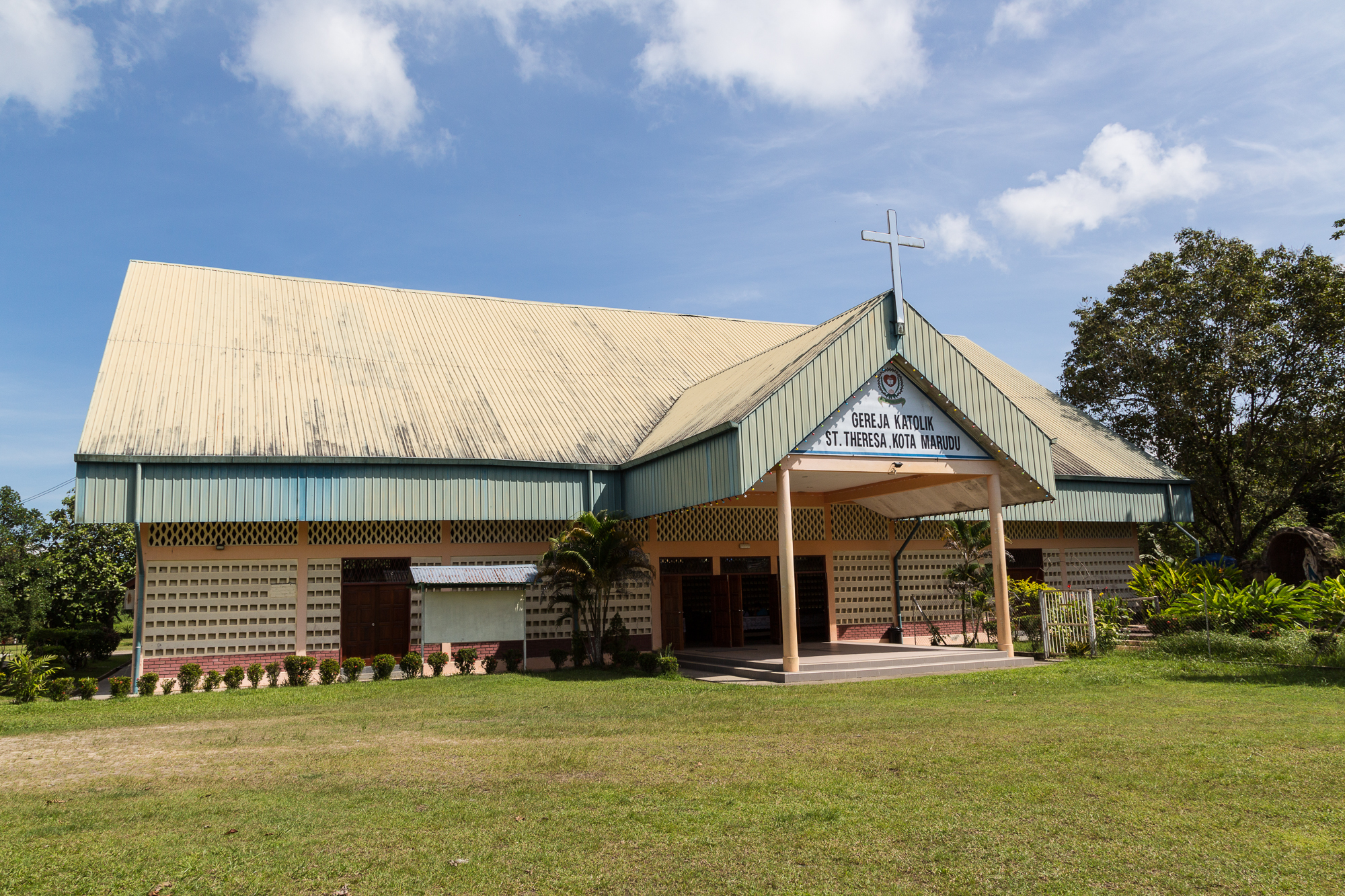
St Theresa's Church in Kota Marudu

  - sub-parishes of St Peter's Church, Tunggung, Kota Marudu
  - St Michael the Archangel's Church, Pinatau, Kota Marudu
  - St Mary's Church Morion, Tandek, Kota Marudu
  - St Barbara's Church Tingkalanon, Tandek, Kota Marudu
  - St John's Church Togudon, Tandek, Kota Marudu
  - St Gerard's Church Salimandut, Tandek, Kota Marudu
  - St Anne's Church, Batutai, Kota Marudu (formerly St. Joseph's Church, Batutai)
  - St Andrew's Church Rasak, Tandek, Kota Marudu
  - St John's Church, Mangaris, Kota Marudu
  - St Joseph's Church Sungoi Laut, Bengkongan, Kota Marudu
  - St Alphonsa Muttathupadathu's Church Sungoi Darat, Bengkongan, Kota Marudu
  - St. Claire of Assisi Church, Nalapak, Kota Marudu
  - Holy Cross Church, Ginaranan/Dalamason, Kota Marudu
  - St. Simon the Zealot Church, Gana, Kota Marudu
  - Assumption of Our Lady Church, Gosusu/Bintasan, Kota Marudu
  - St. Lea of Rome Church Tinogu, Tandek, Kota Marudu
  - St. Benedict of Nursia Church Kinangkaban, Tandek, Kota Marudu
  - St. Francis of Assisi Church, Marudu Darat, Kota Marudu
  - St. Anthony of Padua Church Tarangkapas, Tandek, Kota Marudu (formerly St. Aloysius Gonzaga Church, Tarangkapas)
  - St. Paul's Church, Sonsogon Paliu, Kota Marudu
  - Sonsogon Magandai Catholic Church, Kota Marudu
  - St. Andrew's Church Mangkalua, Tandek, Kota Marudu
  - St Nicholas' Church, Mempakad Darat, Pitas
  - St Stephen's Church, Bilangau Kecil, Pitas
  - St Vincent's Church, Gumpa, Pitas
  - St Monica's Church, Ladap, Pitas
  - St John Paul II Church, Kiambalang, Pitas (formerly St. Peter's Church, Kiambalang, Pitas)
  - St Pio of Pietrelcina Church, Rukom, Pitas
  - St. Ignatius of Loyola Church, Matunggong, Kudat
  - St. Stephen Church, Pinawantai, Matunggong, Kudat and
  - Good Shepherd Church, Koniung, Matunggong, Kudat
- St. Peter's Parish, Kudat

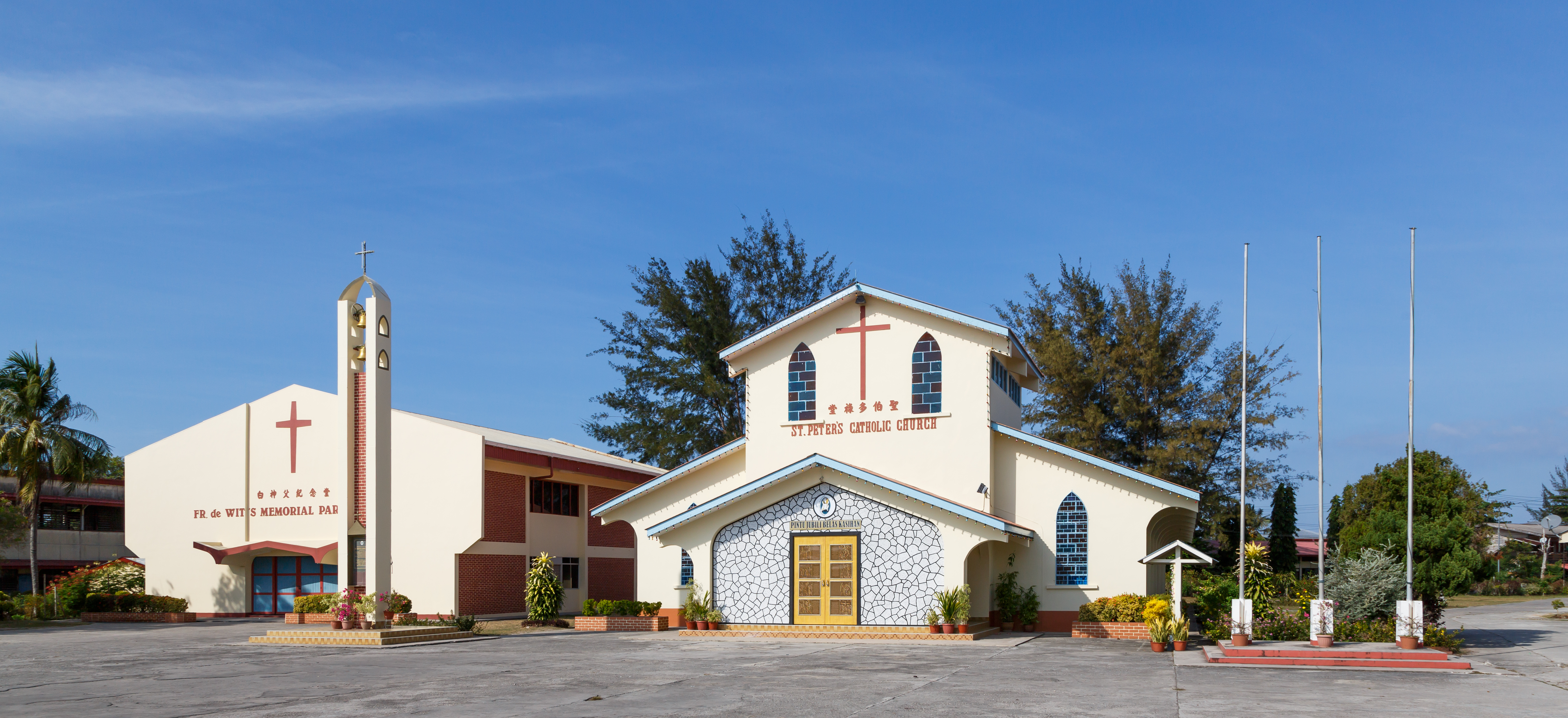
St Peter's Church in Kudat

  - sub-parishes of Church of the Sacred Heart of Jesus, Tajau, Kudat
  - Church of Our Lady Immaculate, Taipa, Kudat and
  - Church of St. Paul, Tinukadan, Kudat
- South West Coast Division Deanery (8 parishes)
- St Michael's Parish, Donggongon, Penampang

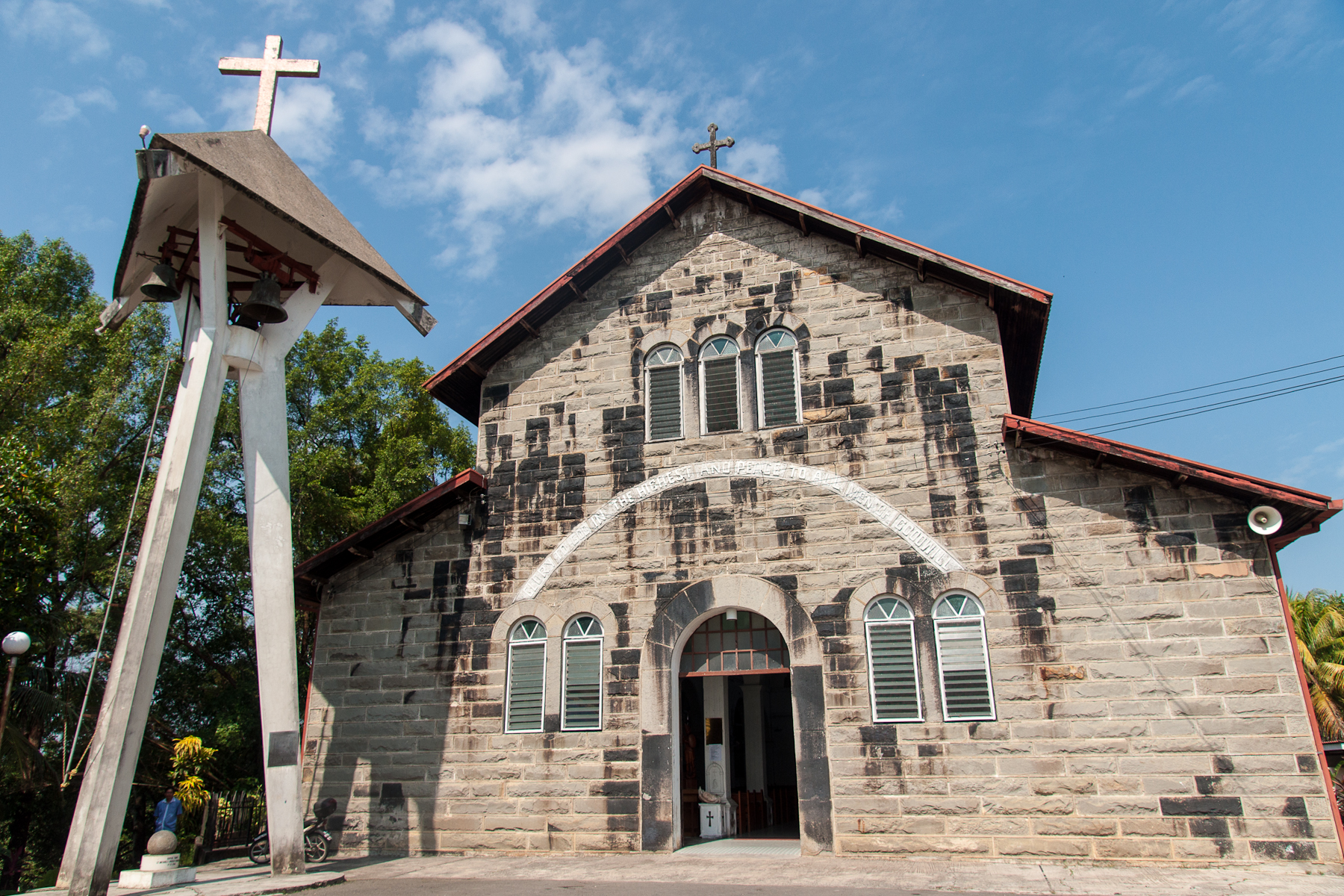
St Michael the Archangel Church in Penampang

  - sub-parishes of Church of St Aloysius Gonzaga, Limbanak, Penampang,
  - Assumption of Our Lady, Sugud, Penampang,
  - St Marcellinus, Minintod, Inanam, Kota Kinabalu,
  - Church of the Divine Mercy Maang, Limbanak, Penampang,
  - Mary Immaculate Conception, Sukang Mabpai, Inanam, Kota Kinabalu,
  - St Theresa of The Child Jesus, Kolopis, Penampang,
  - Woori Jib Chapel/Mary Mother of the Redeemer Church, Potuki, Putatan, Penampang (formerly Hamin Tokou Potuki),
  - Mother of Mercy, Timpangoh Laut, Sugud, Penampang (formerly St Benedict, Timpangoh Laut, Sugud),
  - St Pope John Paul II, Buayan, Ulu Moyog, Penampang (formerly St Patrick, Buayan),
  - St Bernard, Terian, Ulu Moyog, Penampang,
  - St Julius I, Timpayasa, Ulu Moyog, Penampang and
  - Mary, Mother of the Church Tiku, Buayan, Ulu Moyog, Penampang
- Holy Nativity Parish Terawi, Putatan, Penampang
  - sub-parishes of Our Lady of Fatima Church, Talang Taun, Ulu Putatan, Penampang,
  - St Simon the Zealot's Church/Sinundu Miracle Hill, Duvanson, Putatan, Penampang and
  - St Peter the Apostle's Church, Tombovo/Ketiau, Putatan, Penampang
- St Paul's Parish, Dontozidon, Penampang
  - sub-parish of Our Lady Queen of Peace Church, Kobusak/Nosoob, Penampang
- Sacred Heart Parish Inobong, Penampang
  - sub-parishes of Church of Saints Peter and Paul, Babagon, Penampang,
  - Church of St Joseph the Worker, Pogunon, Penampang,
  - Church of the Presentation Pongobonon, Ulu Moyog, Penampang,
  - Church of Christ the King, Kipouvo, Penampang,
  - Church of St Stephen the Martyr, Kibunut, Penampang,
  - Church of St Michael and All Angels Lutung, Penampang,
  - Church of St Thomas the Apostle, Togudon, Penampang,
  - Church of St Martin, Moyog, Penampang,
  - Church of the Holy Cross, Togudon, Penampang,
  - Church of St Andrew the Apostle Longkogungan, Penampang,
  - Church of the Risen Christ Timpangoh, Babagon, Penampang
  - Church of St. Joseph, Kalanggaan, Ulu Moyog, Penampang and
  - Church of the Holy Trinity, Madsiang, Penampang
- Papar Parish District (St. Joseph the Worker Parish/Holy Rosary Parish, Limbahau/St Augustine of Hippo Parish, Kinarut)

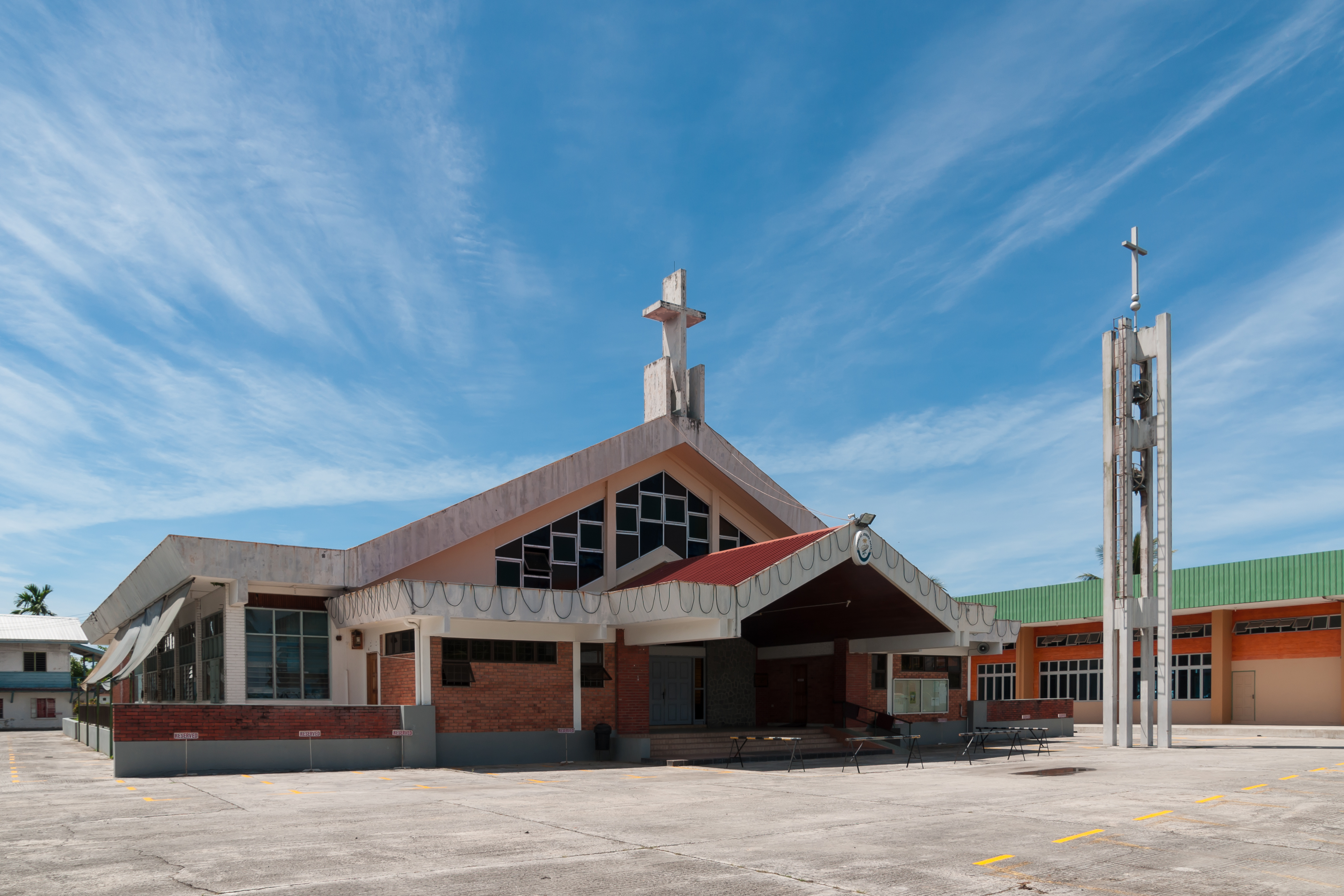
Church of St Joseph the Worker in Papar

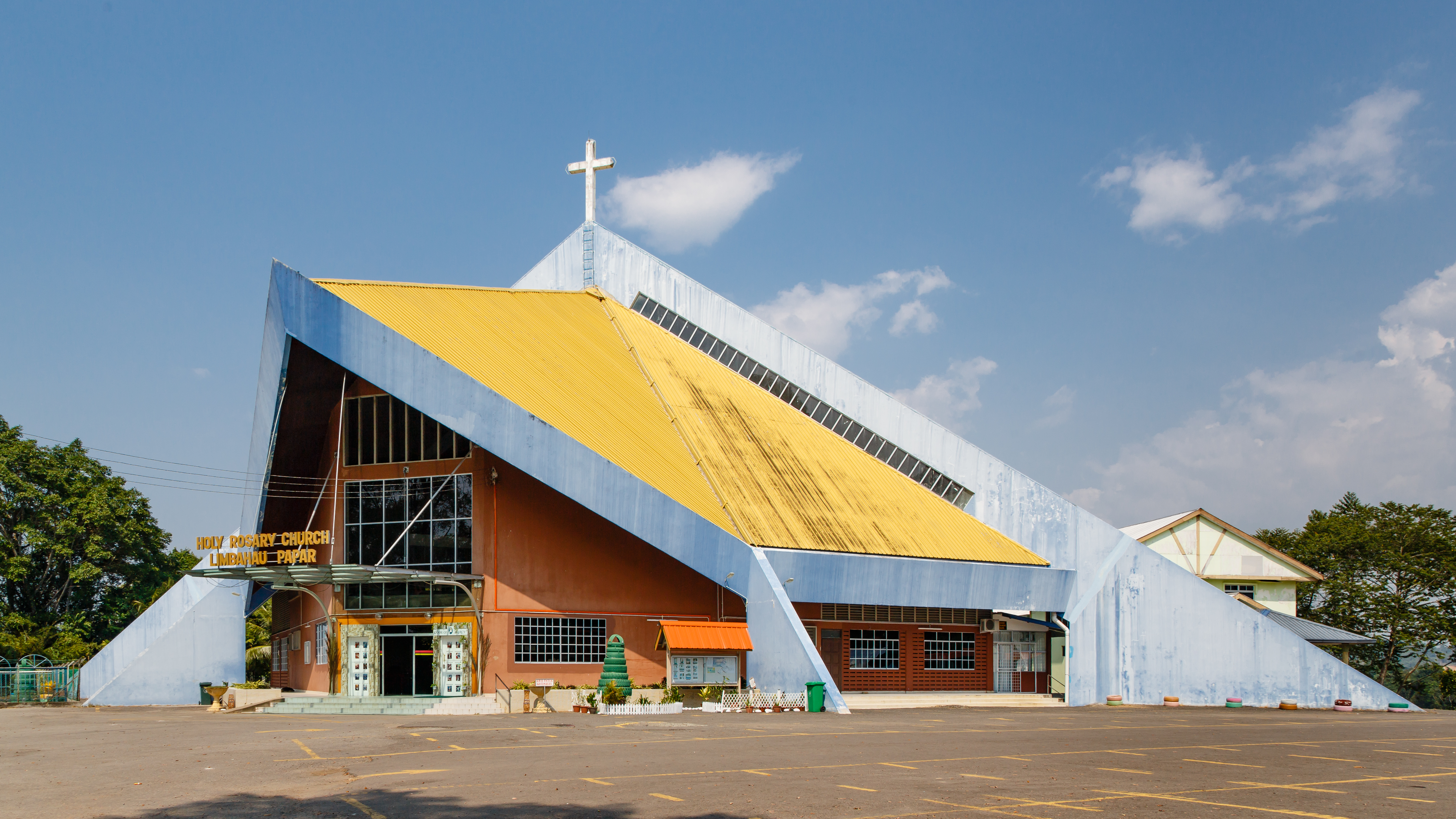
Church of Holy Rosary in Limbahau, Papar

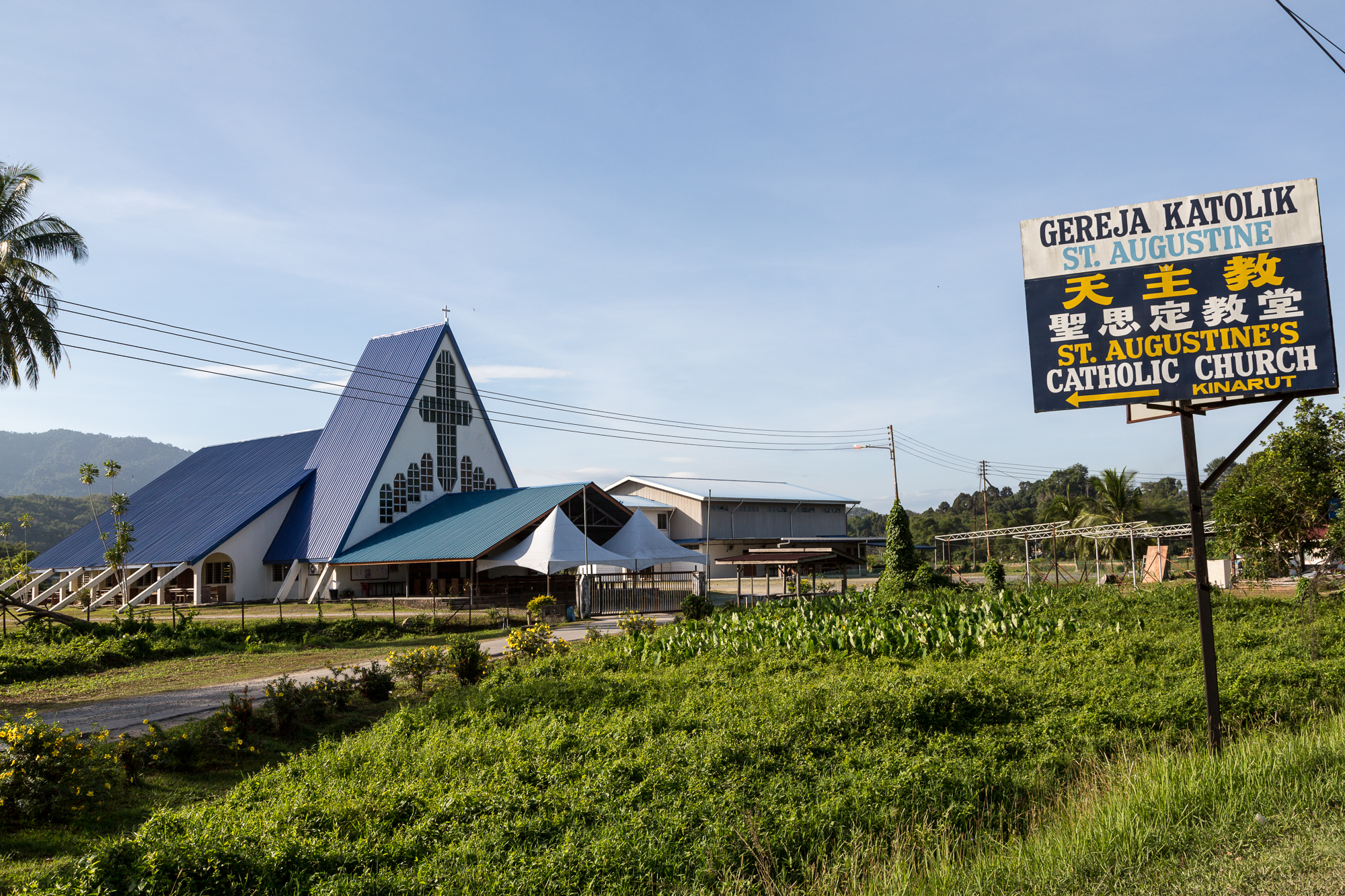
Church of St Augustine of Hippo in Kinarut, Papar

- Limbahau Zone
  - St Patrick's Church, Kinuta, Papar
  - Sacred Heart of Jesus Church, Biau, Papar
  - St Aloysius Gonzaga's Church, Limputong, Papar
  - St Teresa's Church, Sabandil, Papar
  - St Sabina's Church, Titimboungon, Papar
  - St. Andrew Kim Taegon Church, Ovai/Kambizaan, Papar (formerly St. Agnes' Church, Ovai/Kambizaan)
  - Pace Bene Retreat Centre, Purak, Papar
  - St. Linus' Church, Lingan, Papar
  - St. Dominic Savio's Church, Mandalipau, Papar
  - St. Anthony's Church, Bolotikon, Papar
  - St. Monica's Church, Tuntul/Moindang, Papar
  - St. Stephen's Church, Kayau, Papar
  - St. Pedro Calungsod's Church, Kawari, Papar (formerly St. Samuel's Church, Kawari)
- Papar Town Zone
  - St Damian of Molokai, Dambai, Papar
  - St Luke the Evangelist, Lakut, Langkawit, Kimanis, Papar
  - St Anne, Penampang Baru, Kimanis, Papar
  - St Peter, Belatik, Kimanis, Papar
  - St Kenneth, Kelatuan, Kimanis, Papar
  - St Michael the Archangel, Lubang Batu, Mandahan, Kimanis, Papar
  - St. Clement, Kinolosodon, Bongawan, Kimanis, Papar
  - St. Macarius, Sumbiling, Bongawan, Kimanis, Papar
  - St. John Bosco, Toboon/Minansar, Bongawan, Kimanis, Papar
  - St. Cyril, Talantang, Viging, Bongawan, Kimanis, Papar
- Kinarut Zone
  - St Martin de Porres, Mook, Kinarut, Papar
  - St Paul's Chapel on The Hill, Montfort Youth Training Centre, Kinarut, Papar
  - St Paul the Apostle, Bisuang, Papar
  - St Anne Grandmother of Jesus, Punson/Kirilip, Kinarut, Papar
  - St Padre Pio, Labak, Kinarut, Papar
  - St Nicholas of Myra Molonsi, Kompimpinan, Papar
- Blessed Sacrament Parish, Victoria, Labuan

== Religious orders ==
=== Religious men ===
- Brothers of the Christian School (FSC); De La Salle Brothers
- Brothers of St Gabriel (SG); Gabrielite or Monfort Brothers
- Clerical Society of the Most Holy Trinity (SST)
- Marist Brothers of the Schools (FMS)
- Order of Friars Minor (OFM)
- Order of Friars Minor Capuchin (OFM Cap)
- Mill Hill Missionaries (MHM)
- Congregation of the Most Holy Redeemer (CSsR)
- Society of Jesus (SJ)
- Order of Saint Benedict (OSB)
- Friars of Prophet Elijah (Carmelitae Sancti Eliae, CSE)
- Neocatechumenal Way (NCW)

=== Religious women ===
- Discalced Carmelite Nuns (OCD)
- Daughters of St Paul (FSP)
- Good Shepherd Sisters (RGS)
- Franciscan Sisters of the Immaculate Conception (FSIC)
- Sisters of St. Francis of Sarawak (SSFS)

== Missionary schools ==
=== Primary ===
- SRK Sacred Heart, Karamunsing, Kota Kinabalu
- SJK (C) Shan Tao, Kepayan, Kota Kinabalu
- SK St. Mary, Limbahau, Papar
- SK St. Joseph, Donggongon, Penampang
- SK St. Edmund, Kota Belud
- SJK (C) Sacred Heart, Tajau, Kudat
- SJK (C) St. Joseph, Papar
- SJK (C) Our Lady Immaculate, Taipa, Kudat
- SK St. Benedict, Kimolohing, Ranau
- SK St. Aloysius, Limbanak, Penampang
- SK St. Peter, Kudat
- SK Sacred Heart, Biau, Papar
- SJK (C) St. Philip, Kiansom, Tamparuli, Tuaran
- SK St. Theresa, Inobong, Penampang
- SK Our Lady of Fatima, Kelatuan, Kimanis, Papar
- SK Don Bosco Bundu Tuhan, Kundasang, Ranau
- SRK St. James Tenghilan, Tamparuli, Tuaran
- SJK (C) Good Shepherd, Manggatal, Kota Kinabalu
- SK St. Catherine, Inanam, Kota Kinabalu
- SK St. Anne, Labuan
- SK St. Anthony, Dontozidon, Penampang
- SJK (C) St. Peter, Telipok, Kota Kinabalu
- SK St. Paul, Kolopis, Penampang
- SK St. Francis Convent, Bukit Padang, Kota Kinabalu
- SK St. Joseph Tombongon, Kiulu, Tuaran
- SRS Datuk Simon Fung, Likas, Kota Kinabalu
- SK St. John, Labuaya, Tuaran
- SJK (C) St. James, Likas, Kota Kinabalu

=== Secondary ===
- SM La Salle, Tanjung Aru, Kota Kinabalu
- SM St. John, Labuaya, Tuaran
- SM Shan Tao, Likas, Kota Kinabalu
- SMK St. Mary, Limbahau, Papar
- Maktab Nasional, Likas, Kota Kinabalu
- SM Stella Maris, Tanjung Aru, Kota Kinabalu
- SMK St. Peter, Kudat
- SM St. James, Tenghilan, Tuaran
- SM St. Peter, Telipok, Kota Kinabalu
- SM St. Michael, Donggongon, Penampang
- SM St. Anne, Labuan
- SM St. Francis Convent, Bukit Padang, Kota Kinabalu
- SM St. Anthony, Labuan

== Media apostolate/social communications ==
=== Publications ===
- Catholic Sabah (fortnightly archdiocesan newspaper); established in 1957.
- Lu (Chinese bimonthly)

=== Bookshops ===
- Catholic Books Distribution Centre
- Paulines Media Centre (In Charge: Sr. Magdalene Chong, FSP)

== See also ==
- Catholic Church in Malaysia
- List of Catholic dioceses in Malaysia

== Sources and external links ==
- GigaCatholic, with incumbent biography links
- Catholic-Hierarchy
