= St. Catherine Labouré Church, Putatan =

Catholic church in Sabah, Malaysia

St. Catherine Labouré Church, Putatan, Penampang
- Malay: Gereja St. Catherine Labouré Putatan, Penampang
- St. Catherine Labouré Church, Putatan, Penampang
- 5°53′28.571″N 116°3′23.045″E
- Location: Imbaan Road, Putatan, Penampang, Sabah
- Country: Malaysia
- Denomination: Roman Catholic
- Website: stcatherinelaboureputatan.net

History
- Status: Sub-parish church
- Founded: 1881 (site)
- Dedication: St. Catherine Labouré

Architecture
- Architectural type: Romanesque
- Years built: 1885 (transit home), 2013 (current church)

Administration
- Archdiocese: Roman Catholic Archdiocese of Kota Kinabalu

St. Catherine Labouré Church (Malay: Gereja St. Catherine Labouré) is a Roman Catholic church located in Putatan sub-district, Penampang of Sabah, Malaysia.

== History ==
Since the foundation of British North Borneo in 1881, Putatan sub-district in Penampang has been identified as one of the earliest site together with Papar, Jesselton (Api-Api) and Sandakan districts, as well as Sibu, Kanowit, Igan, Oya, Mukah and Baram in the Raj of Sarawak for the Christian mission by Rev. Fr. Thomas Jackson, the Second Perfect Apostle based in the Crown Colony of Labuan.

=== Early background ===
Fr. Alexander Prenger was soon assigned for the mission in 1885, where he sailed from the island of Labuan through Bundu in Kuala Penyu District and along the coastal area of the South China Sea to the northwest coast of northern Borneo. He arrived at the bank of the Putatan River, a small port known as Stramp Port (known to the local indigenous as "Sitampot"), where Fr. Prenger met two indigenous Penampang Kadazan locals of the Putatan area named Aki Lokubal and his brother Aki Bunal, who at the time was at the port welcoming him warmly. Both the local indigenous people, who were known by Fr. Prenger for being so friendly and generous in nature, took Fr. Prenger to stay at their house in a small village called Imbaan, which is located at a walking distance from the port he arrived at; this site soon became the site for the present church. Since the indigenous people of Putatan are strong in their local beliefs of traditional North Bornean religions, Momolianism, a type of animist-pagan religion, Fr. Prenger did not manage to realise his first mission; thus, he moved from the upper river of Putatan to Inobong, where he was well received and taken care of by the indigenous. Despite the indigenous local community's earlier refusal to convert to Christianity, the locals were kind enough to build a Mission Transit Home for Fr. Prenger, which was later used by other missionary priests during their visits.

Another foreign priest named Fr. Rientjes, who was well known to the locals, was put in charge of the Putatan mission in early 1890, where he worked closely with the locals and learnt the native indigenous language. Similar to Fr. Prenger, Fr. Rientjes also wanted to establish a church near the Transit Home, but was unable to realise the mission when he accidentally drowned while swimming at the Putatan River a year later, on 15 May 1891. Furthermore, in 1906, another priest named Fr. Duxneuner, who also became a close friend to Aki Lakubal, managed to convince Lakubal to bring his son Tuyo for an evangelisation mission in Penampang District. While on the mission, Tuyo assisted Fr. Duxneuner in church activities while at the same time attending a mission school. Tuyo then took Ethwin as his Christian name while being baptised by Fr. Duxneuner. Ethwin Tuyo, who is the grandfather of Catherine Moinin (died 2019), was the first native pagan indigenous person of Putatan to be converted to Christianity, where his siblings, relatives and close friends also followed in his steps by embracing the Christian faith together. In 1926, Fr. Wachter set up one of the earliest Catholic mission schools in Imbaan, namely St. Peter's School, with the hope of building a church for the growing Catholic community led by Ethwin. Following the Japanese occupation, Fr. Wachter was, however, captured by Japanese soldiers and was never thereafter found. The school was soon closed and never reopened, with his plan to build a church for the community also never materialising.

=== Church establishment after 127 years ===
Aki Lokubal soon happened to be the great-grandfather of Mdm Catherine Moinin, who then generously donated her ancestral land for the site of the church together with another acre of land bought by generous Samaritans. In 2008, following the meeting between the late Rev. Fr. Fundes Motiung, Stephen Sondoh, who is the former Penampang District Officer, Tony Mojigoh and several others for the establishment of a church in Putatan with the increase of Catholic migration from other districts, a church structure was then planned to be constructed through volunteer work between various organisations. The development plan proposal was submitted to the emeritus Archbishop John Lee for blessing and approval. The volunteer then started the project on 12 January 2013 with an initial funding of RM1.8 million, with the total cost for the whole completion estimated to be RM10.4 million. To this date, the church is still nearing completion due to financial constraints, with donations also coming in batches from generous individuals, church members, public donations, as well as both state and federal government grant funding.
