= John Wong Soo Kau =

Malaysian Archbishop (born 1969)

His Grace The Most Reverend Datuk John Wong Soo Kau
- Archbishop of Kota Kinabalu; President of the CBCMSB Episcopal Regional Commission for Family, Laity and Life
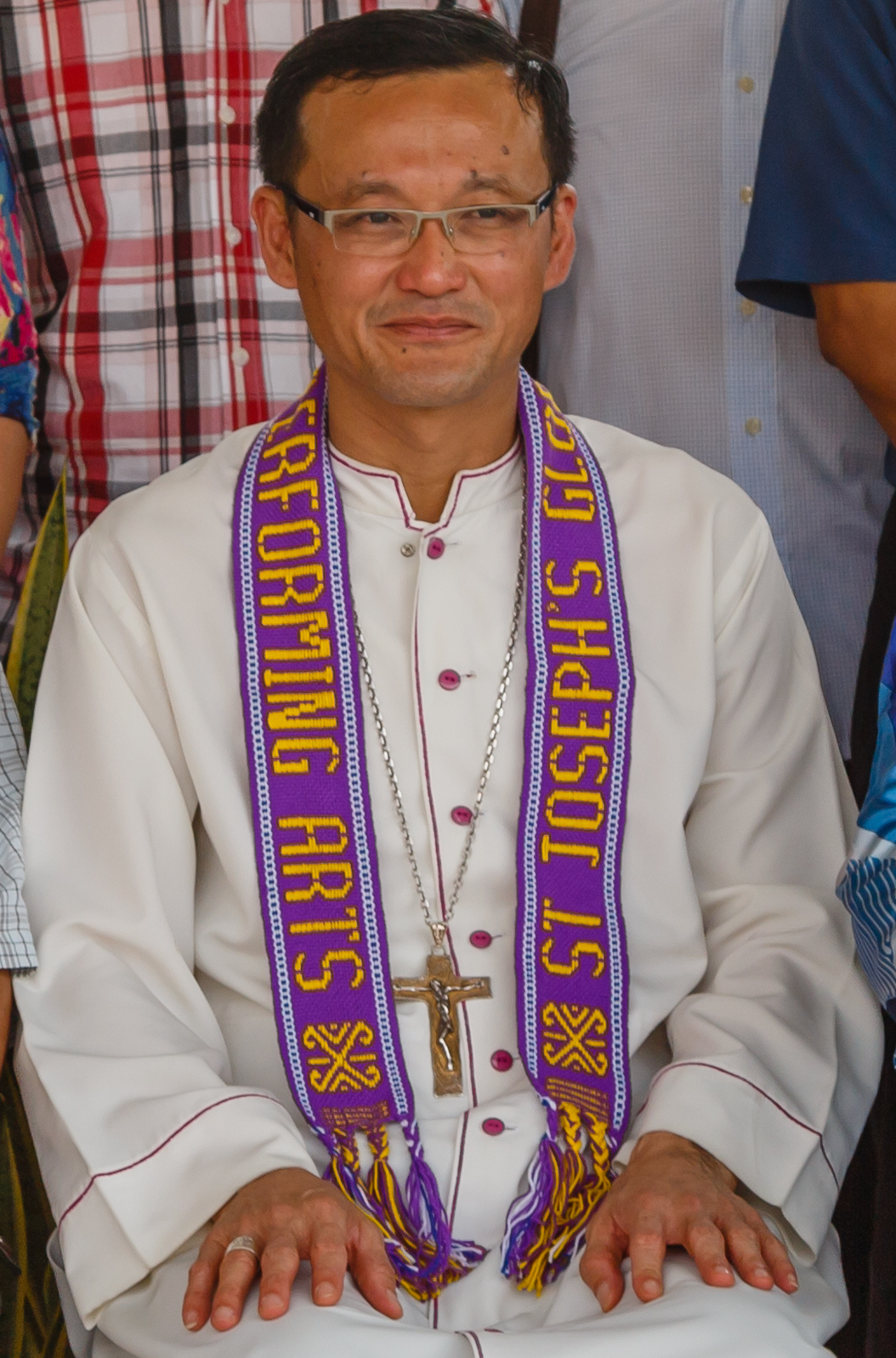
- Archbishop John in 2016
- Church: Catholic Church
- Archdiocese: Kota Kinabalu
- See: Kota Kinabalu
- Appointed: 1 December 2012
- Installed: 24 January 2013
- Predecessor: John Lee
- Previous posts: Rector of Sacred Heart Cathedral (Kota Kinabalu) (2016-2018); Director of aspirants at archdiocesan centre, Penampang (2004-2010); Spiritual Adviser to the Bible Commission (2006-2008); Assistant parish priest of Sacred Heart Cathedral (Kota Kinabalu) (1999-2002)

Orders
- Ordination: 21 January 1999 by John Lee
- Consecration: 1 October 2010 by John Lee, Cornelius Piong and Julius Dusin Gitom

Personal details
- Born: John Wong Soo Kau; 6 June 1969 (age 57) Sandakan, Sabah, Malaysia
- Denomination: Roman Catholic
- Residence: Kota Kinabalu, Sabah, Malaysia
- Education: Pontifical Theological Faculty Teresianum, St. Peter's College, Kuching, Sarawak.
- Motto: Iman Kasih Harapan (English: Faith Love Hope)
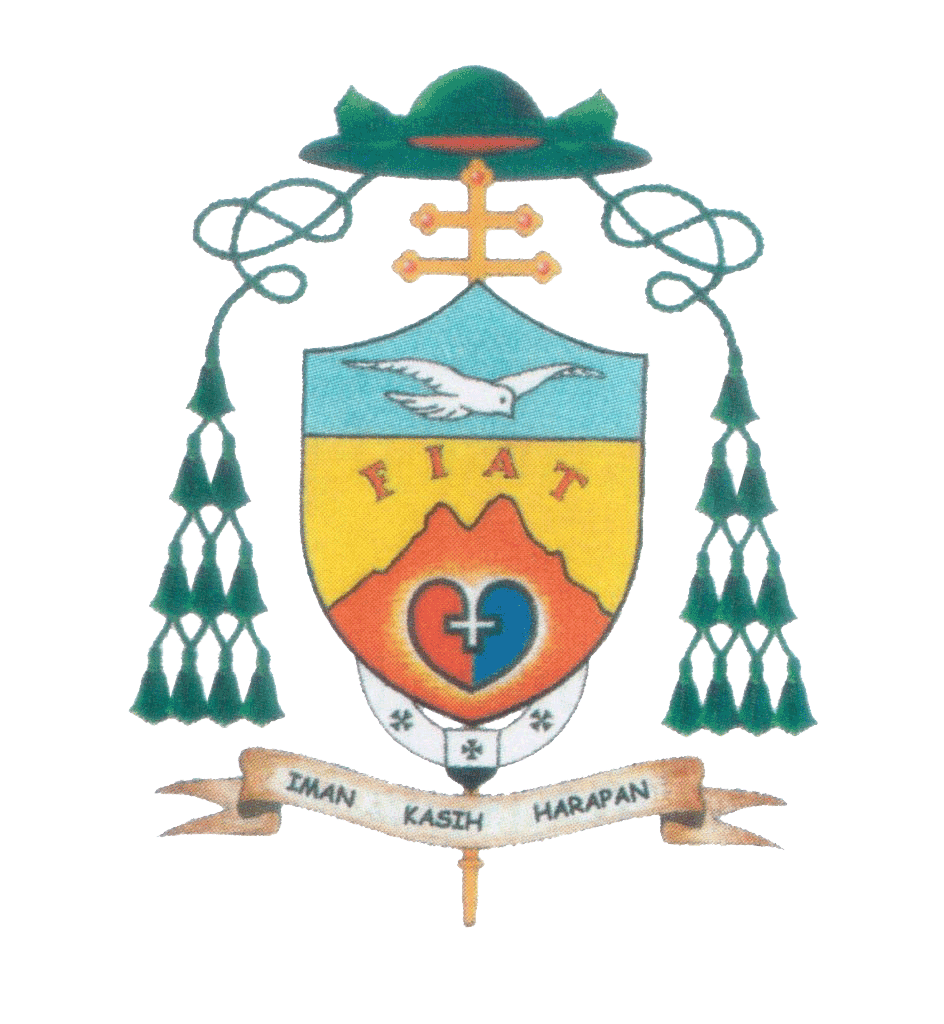
- Coat of arms: John Wong Soo Kau's coat of arms

Styles of John Wong Soo Kau
- Reference style: The Most Reverend
- Spoken style: Your Grace
- Religious style: Archbishop

Ordination history of John Wong Soo Kau
History
Diaconal ordination
- Ordained by: John Lee
Priestly ordination
- Ordained by: John Lee
Episcopal consecration
- Principal consecrator: John Lee
- Co-consecrators: Cornelius Piong; Julius Dusin Gitom

John Wong Soo Kau (born 6 June 1969) is a Malaysian prelate of the Catholic Church. He was named the second metropolitan Archbishop of Kota Kinabalu on 24 January 2013, the Feast of St Francis de Sales, by Pope Francis. He is fully styled as His Grace Most Reverend Datuk John Wong, Archbishop of Kota Kinabalu. Sacred Heart Cathedral in the metropolitan of Kota Kinabalu is the seat of Archbishop Wong, and the cathedral church of the Roman Catholic Archdiocese of Kota Kinabalu.

== Early life and ministry ==
=== Family ===
John Wong was born as the 7th of 11 children (five brothers and five sisters) on 6 June 1968 in Sandakan, Sabah to ethnic Hakka Chinese Catholic parents. His late father, Paul Wong Shui Tshun was a hawker selling yong taufu (stuffed bean curd) and fish balls at the Sandakan Central Market, whilst his late mother, Rose Chung Thiem Yin (1939 – 2025) was a housewife.

=== Vocation ===
Before his seminary formation from 1992 to 1998 at St. Peter's College, Kuching, Sarawak, Wong worked as a salesman from 1987 to 1990. He was ordained a deacon on 8 January 1998 at the Sacred Heart Cathedral and ordained a priest on 22 January 1999 at St. Mary's Church (now Cathedral) by Bishop John Lee.

The late Fr Tobias Chi, the then parish rector of the church in Sandakan, had much influence in his consideration of the priestly vocation, whilst being present during his ordinations. Wong served as assistant parish priest of Sacred Heart Cathedral from 1999 to 2002.

He then continued to study for a licentiate in Carmelite spirituality for two years at the Pontifical Theological Faculty "Teresianum" in Rome, Italy. On his return in 2004, he was appointed as rector of the Catholic Diocesan Centre in Penampang and director of the aspirants until his appointment as archbishop of Kota Kinabalu.

== Episcopal ministry ==
=== Appointment ===
He was rushing to the Bundu Tuhan Retreat Centre at Kundasang on 7 June 2010, a day after his 42nd Birthday, to attend a week-long seminar there. Among the unopened mail he brought along was a letter with a Bangkok post mark, the city where the office of the Apostolic Nuncio of Pope Benedict XVI was located.

He found time to read the letter, and to his shock it informed him of his appointment. He spent the next two days in reflection before answering the call. A few weeks later, on 21 June 2010, Pope Benedict XVI officially appointed him as the Coadjutor Archbishop of Kota Kinabalu.

=== Ordination and Installation ===
His episcopal ordination took place on 1 October 2010. This made him one of the youngest candidates as shepherd in Malaysia, Singapore and Brunei.

Due to the mandatory resignation age of 75 of Archbishop John Lee, on 1 December 2012, Wong was appointed as the 2nd Metropolitan Archbishop of Kota Kinabalu and formally installed on 24 January 2013, just a month after his appointment.

The motto for Wong's episcopacy is "Iman, Kasih, Harapan" (Faith, Love, Hope), a reminder on the growth of the faithful, charitable works, and abounding hope, in fulfilling the mission and vision of the Archdiocese.

=== Obligations ===
He is the current President of the Catholic Bishops' Conference of Malaysia, Singapore and Brunei Episcopal Regional Commission for Family, Laity and Life.

In his tenure as shepherd, he launched the Kadazan Audible Bible together with the former Apostolic Nuncio to Malaysia, Most Rev Joseph Marino, at Holy Family Church, Telipok, in 2016.

The proposal of a RM9.6 million project to build the new Catholic Centre was made in 2018. It has completed the construction of the new Catholic Centre adjacent to the Sacred Heart Cathedral, at the location of a former Chinese primary school. It was officially blessed in early 2021 and opened by the Apostolic Nuncio of Malaysia, Wojciech Załuski, in November 2022.

He was also the main celebrant and spiritual head of celebrations in the first virtual and 5th edition of Sabah Youth Day, originally planned for 2020 but pushed forward to July 2021 due to the pandemic. It brought together more than 2,500 Catholic youths from around Sabah and some from other dioceses in an online setting to discuss Catholic youth life in Sabah.

== Coat of Arms ==
Coat of arms of John Wong Soo Kau
Motto IMAN KASIH HARAPAN (Malay for "FAITH LOVE HOPE") Symbolism The Shield: The shield symbolises the need to rely always on the amour of God, carrying the shield of faith so that it can be used to put out the burning arrows of Satan. The White Dove: It signifies the everlasting presence of the Holy Spirit in the Church, with Light Blue Accent the colour of the Blessed Virgin Mary The Red "FIAT": The Latin word Fiat means Let it be done; the attitude of Mary in accepting the Word of God, resulting in the Word becoming flesh in her. The Mountain: The outline of Mt Kinabalu signifies the location of the Archdiocese. It symbolises Mt Zion the mountain where God has constituted Jesus Christ as King. It is dawned by yellow which signifies the glory of God that is everlasting The Heart with Cross: The emblem of the Sacred Heart Cathedral in Kota Kinabalu, the seat of the Archbishop. The red side represents the Sacred Heart of Jesus while the blue side represents the Immaculate Heart of Mary.

== Honours ==
He has received the award of the Commander of the Order of Kinabalu (PGDK) which carries the title "Datuk" from current Sabah Head of State Tuan Yang di-Pertua Tun Datuk Seri Panglima Dr Juhar Mahiruddin on 1 October 2016, coinciding with his 6th Episcopal Ordination Anniversary.

=== Honours of Sabah ===
- Sabah
  - Commander of the Order of Kinabalu (PGDK) (2016)
