= Simon Michael Fung Kui Heong =

The Right Reverend Datuk Simon Fung D.D., P.G.D.K.
- Bishop of Kota Kinabalu
- Diocese: Kota Kinabalu
- Installed: 19 May 1977
- Predecessor: Peter Chung Hoan Ting
- Successor: John Lee Hiong Fun-Yit Yaw
- Previous posts: Vicar Apostolic of Kota Kinabalu & Titular Bishop of Catabum Castra (1975-1976)

Orders
- Ordination: 29 December 1963 by Rt Rev. James Buis
- Consecration: 14 November 1975 by Rt. Rev. Anthony Denis Galvin

Personal details
- Born: 3 June 1931 Sandakan, Sabah, Malaysia (then British North Borneo)
- Died: 16 November 1985 (aged 54) Melbourne, Australia
- Buried: At Sacred Heart Cathedral, Kota Kinabalu, Sabah, Malaysia
- Denomination: Roman Catholic
- Education: College General Major Seminary, Penang

Simon Michael Fung Kui Heong (3 June 1931 – 16 November 1985) was a Malaysian prelate of the Catholic Church. He was named as the third Vicar Apostolic of the Vicariate of Kota Kinabalu (now Archdiocese) and Titular Bishop of Catabum Castra in 1975, and then was elevated as the first Bishop of the Diocese of Kota Kinabalu in 1977, with both positions given by Pope Paul VI. He was the first Sabahan to ever become a Bishop in Malaysia. He died on 16 November 1985, two days after his 10th episcopal ordination anniversary.

== Priestly ministry ==
Simon Fung was born on 3 June 1931 in Sandakan. He decided to enter the priesthood by entering the College General Major Seminary Penang in 1955 and was ordained a priest in 1963. Some of the posts that he served are Keningau (1964–1966), Tambunan (1966–1968) and Kudat (1968–1970). The prelate then continued his studies to gain his Doctorate in Divinity. He then came back and served at Tenom (1972–1975).

== Episcopal ministry ==
=== Appointments ===
On 14 November 1975, he was chosen to become a bishop by Pope Paul VI and consecrated by Rt. Rev. Anthony Denis Galvin from the Diocese of Miri, Sarawak, at the Sacred Heart Cathedral as the new vicar apostolic of Kota Kinabalu, with the added post of Titular Bishop of Cantabum Castra.

With the elevation of the Vicariate to Diocese on 31 May 1976 by Pope Paul VI, the prelate was officially installed as the first Bishop of Kota Kinabalu on 19 May 1977 under the Metropolitan Archdiocese of Kuching.

=== Actions ===
Under the prelate, additional mission stations were opened. He was instrumental in propelling the physical development of the diocese and the church in Sabah. He also initiated as well as supported the construction of churches and outstation chapels throughout the diocese, including the current Sacred Heart Cathedral (1981).

=== State award ===
On 16 September 1982, the prelate was awarded a Datukship with the Commander of the Order of Kinabalu Award (P.G.D.K.) by Yang di-Pertua Negeri of Sabah, Yang Amat Berbahagia Tun Mohamad Adnan Robert in conjunction with his 65th official birthday celebrations for the recognition of the contributions made by the prelate and the church to the development of the state as a whole.

=== Honours of Sabah ===
- Sabah
  - Commander of the Order of Kinabalu (P.G.D.K.) (1982)

== Death and legacy ==
In November 1985 the prelate died while receiving treatment for stomach cancer in Melbourne, Australia. His remains were returned to Kota Kinabalu, and he was buried at the Mile 4.5 St. Joseph's Catholic Cemetery in Penampang on 22 November 1985. The tomb was relocated at the memorial plot in front of the Sacred Heart Cathedral Blessed Sacrament Chapel in 1987.

Two schools have been named in his honour, the SRS Datuk Simon Fung (primary school) and the Taska/Tadika Datuk Simon Fung (kindergarten), both in the St Simon Educational Complex at Kingfisher, Likas, Kota Kinabalu.

== See also ==
- Roman Catholic Archdiocese of Kota Kinabalu
