= Carlos Cuarteroni =

Spanish mariner and missionary in Southeast Asia (1816–1880)

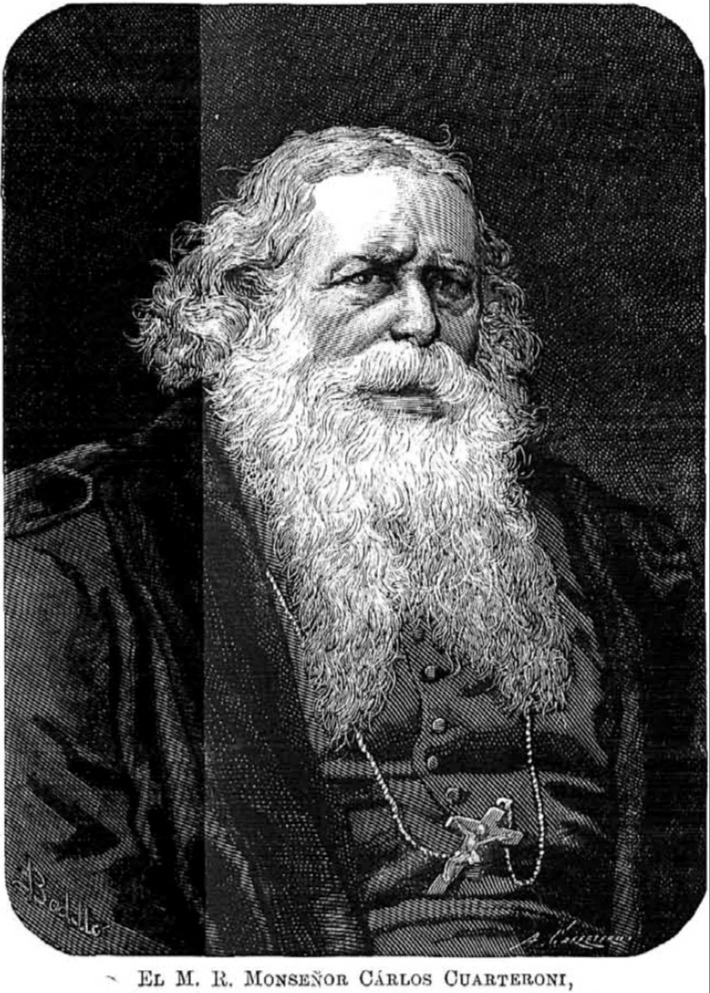
Portrait of Carlos Cuarteroni published in 1880, La Ilustración Española y Americana.

The Reverend Monsignor Carlos Cuarteroni (full name Carlos Domingo Antonio Fernandez Genaro Cuarteroni; 19 September 1816 – 12 March 1880) was a Spanish mariner who later became a priest. He established the first Roman Catholic missions in northern Borneo.

== Biography ==
Born in Cádiz to an Italian father and Spanish mother, Carlos went to sea at 13. He was based in the Philippines and built up his experience on the route between Manila and Macao until he became a full captain in 1841. By February 1844, Carlos bought a 146-ton topsail schooner, Il Martiri de Tunkin. He set out to find and salvage valuable cargo from the wreck of the Christina. He succeeded, surrendered (after some delay) the treasure to its insurers in Hong Kong, and was well rewarded.

He undertook several voyages in the islands south and east of the Philippines, during which he freed several slaves and did some evangelising. He became more interested in missionary work and went back to Europe for support and training. In 1855, he was appointed Priest Apostolic to Borneo by the Pope and left for the east in 1856 with two Italian priests to assist him.

The mission was welcomed in Labuan in 1857 and established stations in Brunei and at Looc Porin (near where Kota Kinabalu is now). However, problems with his assistants left him alone from 1860, and the mission made little progress.

Cuarteron, already ill, resigned his post in Rome in December 1879, then returned to his sister's home in Cádiz, where he died of pneumonia on 12 March 1880.
