= John Lee Hiong Fun-Yit Yaw =

His Grace The Most Reverend Datuk John Lee D.D., P.G.D.K.
- Archbishop Emeritus of Kota Kinabalu
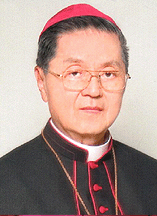
- See: Archdiocese of Kota Kinabalu
- Installed: 26 June 1987
- Term ended: 24 January 2013
- Predecessor: Simon Michael Fung Kui Heong
- Successor: John Wong Soo Kau

Orders
- Ordination: 27 December 1964
- Consecration: 26 June 1987

Personal details
- Born: John Lee Hiong Fun Yit Yaw; 25 October 1933 (age 92) Jesselton, North Borneo
- Denomination: Roman Catholic
- Residence: Archbishop’s Residence, Mile 4.5, Jalan Penampang Lama, Kampung Dontozidon, Nosoob, Penampang
- Profession: Diocesan Priest
- Coat of arms

John Lee was born on 5 October 1933 in Jesselton, North Borneo (now Sabah). He was ordained a priest on 27 December 1964, and appointed Bishop of Kota Kinabalu on 31 March 1987. His episcopal ordination was on 26 June 1987. On 23 May 2008 he was appointed as Metropolitan Archbishop of Kota Kinabalu when the diocese was elevated to an archdiocese. He was the president of the Malaysia-Singapore-Brunei Episcopal Commission for Family Life. He officially retired on 24 January 2013 and was succeeded by John Wong Soo Kau.

== Coat of arms ==
THE CROSS

Aside from the white two-barred cross inside the shield, a bigger one in gold is placed behind the shield. It relates to the archbishop's processional cross and the jurisdiction it symbolises.

HAT AND TASSELS

These are traditional signs of the Church that reflect the Office of Metropolitan Archbishops of the Catholic Church.

THE PALLIUM

The pallium, a woollen vestment with six crosses worn over the shoulders, is a distinctive vestment of metropolitan archbishops and is displayed below the shield.

THE SHIELD

This forms the central part of the armorial bearings.

THE MOUNTAIN

The outline of Mt Kinabalu signifies the location of the Archdiocese of Kota Kinabalu in the State of Sabah in the Federation of Malaysia, since the mountain is one of the most outstanding landmarks of the state.

AI

This Chinese character meaning LOVE is drawn graphically into two parts. The upper part of the character illustrates the simple roof of a shepherd's hut. Taking shelter below it, are the Blessed Virgin Mary and Child Jesus on the manger.

MOTTO

The words: KASIHLAH SATU SAMA LAIN (Malaysian for "Love one another") is adopted as the official motto of the archbishop.

THE COLOURS

The green hat and tassels are the official colours used by the archbishop of an archdiocese.

=== Honours of Sabah ===
- Sabah
  - Commander of the Order of Kinabalu (P.G.D.K.) (1990)

== See also ==
- Roman Catholic Archdiocese of Kota Kinabalu
