= Sacred Heart Cathedral, Kota Kinabalu =

Sacred Heart Cathedral
- Malay: Katedral Hati Kudus
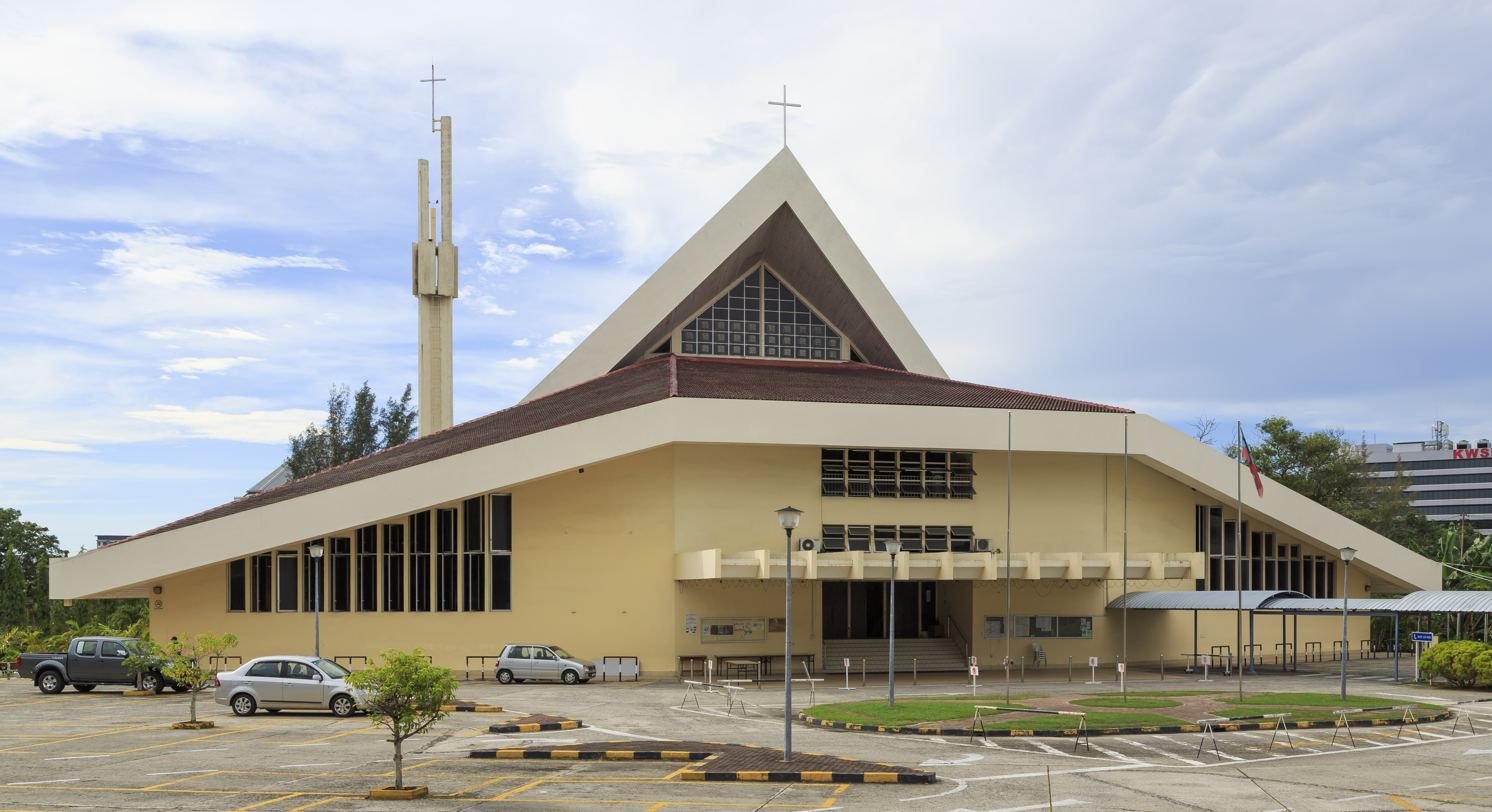
- Sacred Heart Cathedral
- 5°57′54″N 116°04′19.2″E
- Location: Karamunsing, Kota Kinabalu, Sabah
- Country: Malaysia
- Denomination: Roman Catholic
- Website: www.shckk.org

History
- Founded: 1911 (Parish)
- Dedicated: 22 June 1911 (original church); 14 August 1938 (rebuilt church); 11 December 1949 (rebuilt church/cathedral); 21 November 1981 (current cathedral)

Architecture
- Architect(s): Shen Dah Cheong (Principal); Rev. Tobias Chi (advisor)
- Completed: 1911–1938 (original church); 1938–1945 (rebuilt church); 1949–1979 (rebuilt church/cathedral); 1981 (current rebuilt cathedral)

Administration
- Province: Ecclesiastical Province of Kota Kinabalu
- Archdiocese: Kota Kinabalu

Clergy
- Archbishop: John Wong Soo Kau
- Rector: Nicholas Stephen

Sacred Heart Cathedral is the cathedral of the Roman Catholic Archdiocese of Kota Kinabalu, and the seat of its current archbishop, John Wong Soo Kau. The current cathedral was built from 1979 to 1981, with its dedication held on 21 November 1981.

== History ==
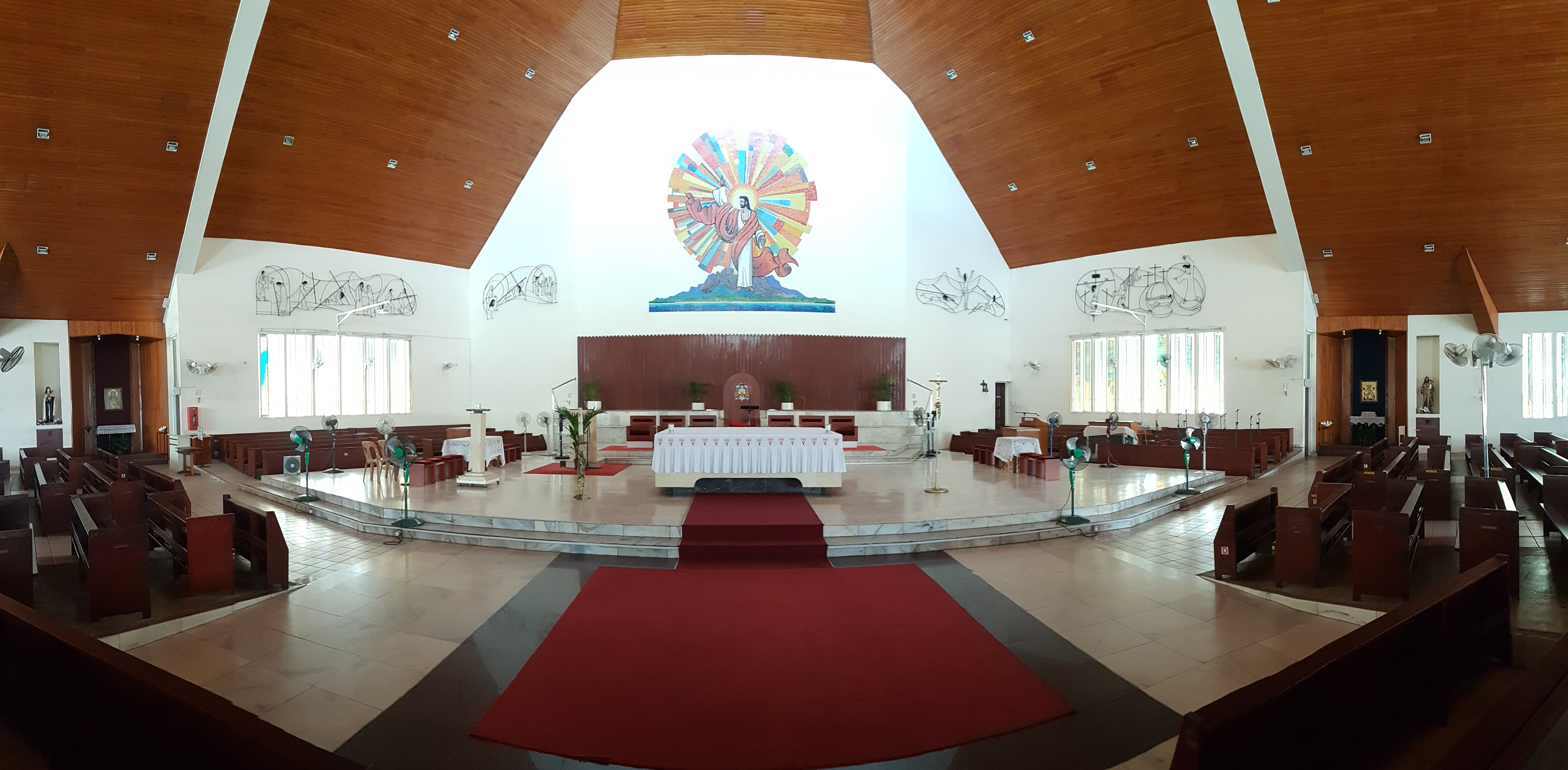
Panorama of the Sanctuary

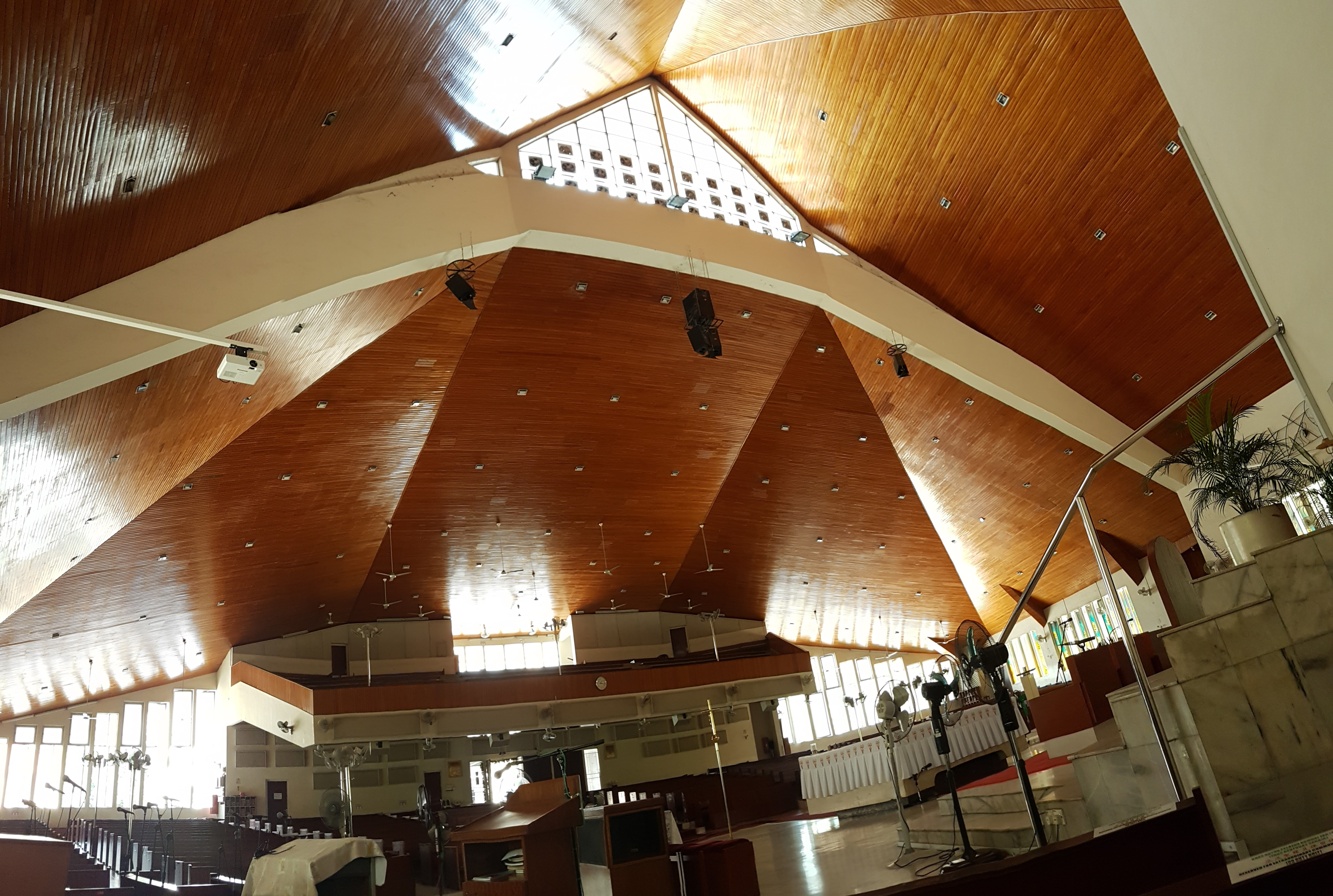
Interior and ceiling of the Cathedral

In early January 1903, Fr. Henry van der Heyden first arrived in Jesselton (present-day Kota Kinabalu). The aggressive policy of importing Chinese workers by the North Borneo Chartered Company Government soon flooded the town with the arrival of hundreds of Chinese immigrants. The bulk of the early Catholic community was made up of poor Hakka farmers in a completely new land striving to adjust to all the harsh conditions of a new life together with some Europeans, Indians, Filipinos and the Kadazan-Dusuns who later formed the backbone of the Catholic community in Jesselton. Surrounded by experience of much struggles and suffering in their daily lives, Fr. Heyden thought of God's compassionate love for His children in Borneo, and remembered that Jesus also suffered and died for them, with the church was then named Sacred Heart after the Sacred Heart of Jesus. The land site of the cathedral was procured by Fr. Goossens and Fr. Prenger under Heyden's name on 9 April 1903. The first cathedral building was built by Mill Hill missionary Fr. Valentine Weber in 1911 and the second by Fr. Arnold Verhoeven in 1938. During World War II, the cathedral was nearly razed to the ground with only some pillars and the foundation survived the Japanese bombing. The church was rebuilt after the war and opened in 1949 by Msgr. James Buis with another major renovation by Fr. Tobias Chi was done in 1981.

== Gallery ==
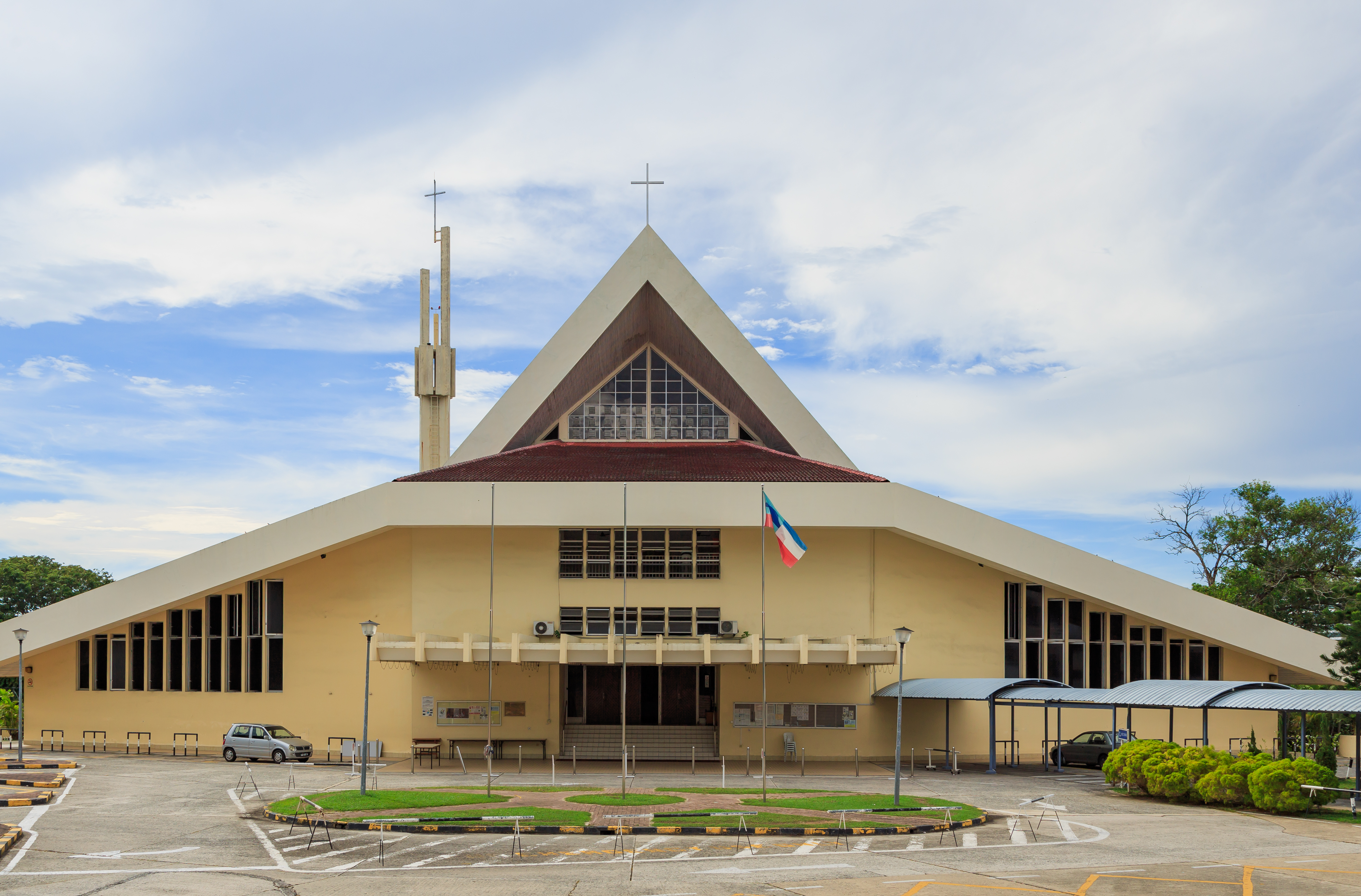
Cathedral Facade

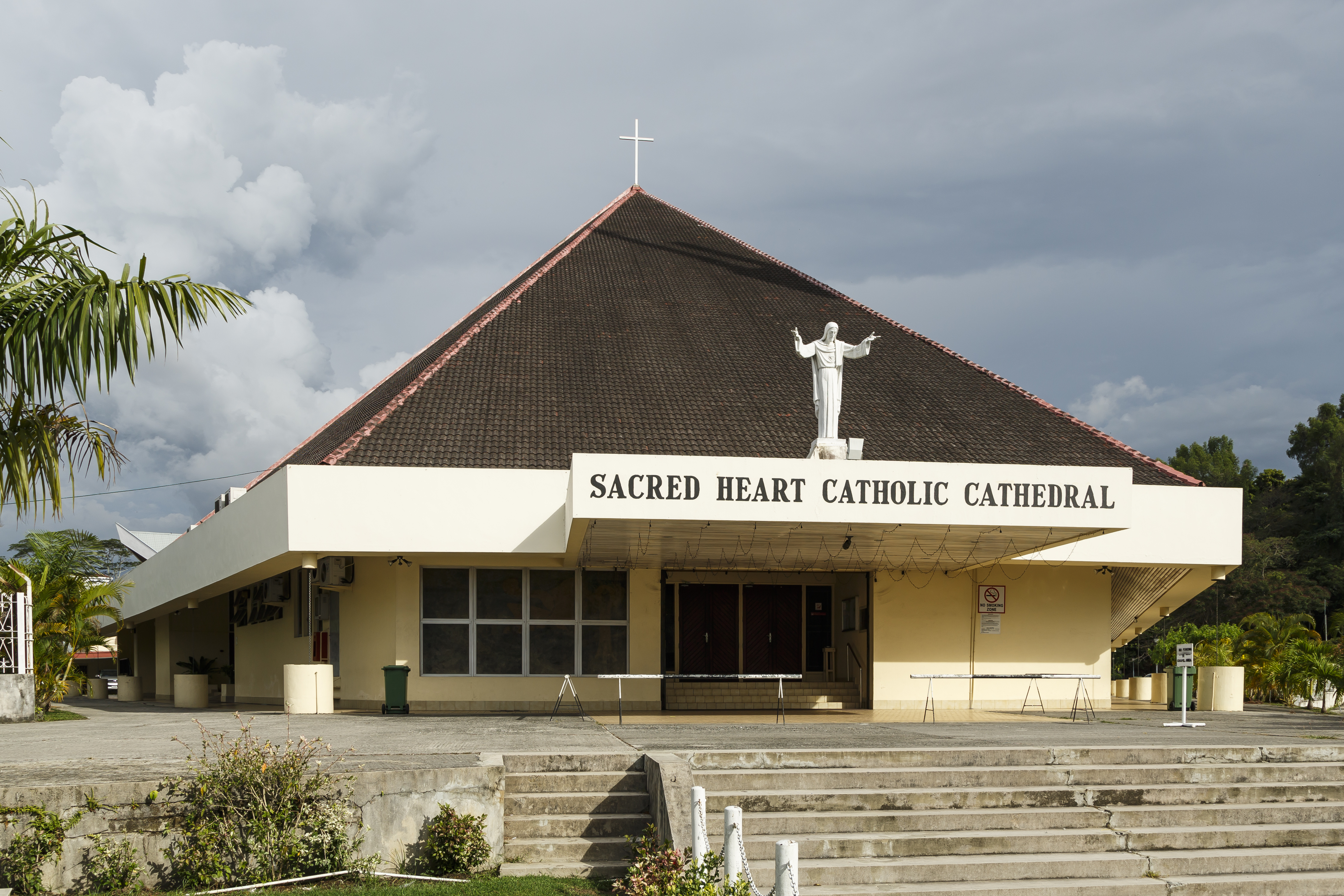
Rear view of the Cathedral

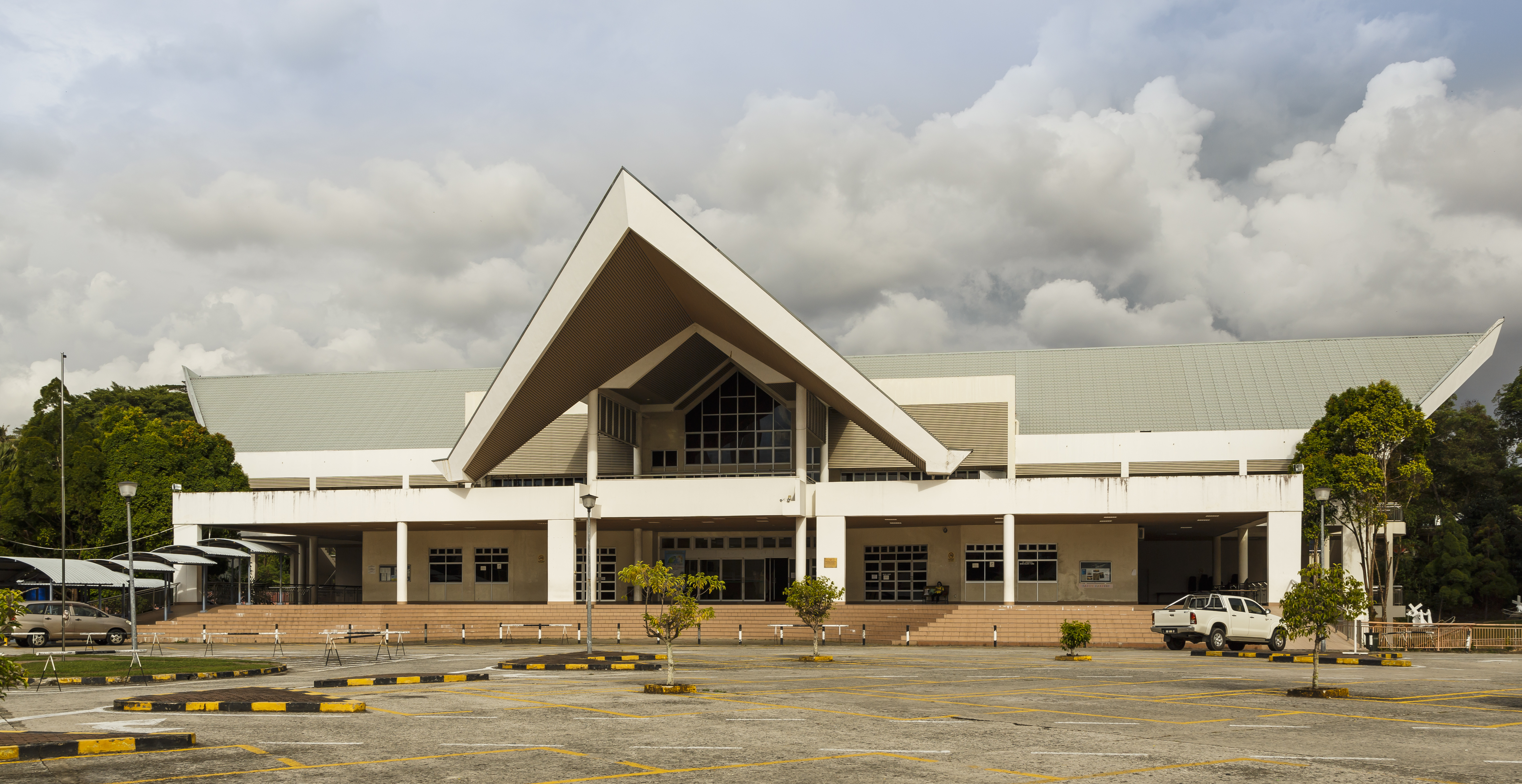
Parish Centre Facade

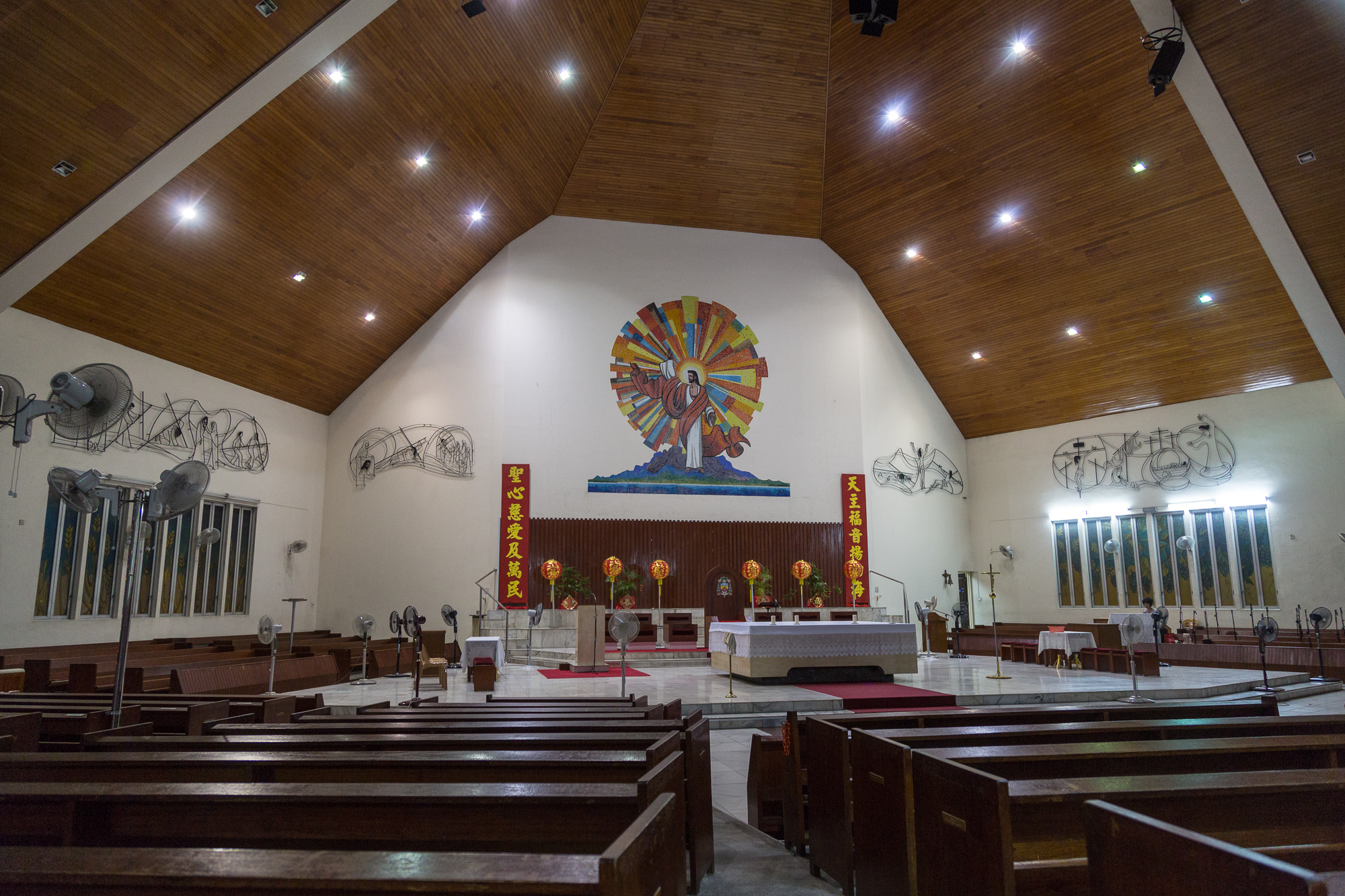
Interior during Chinese New Year Celebrations

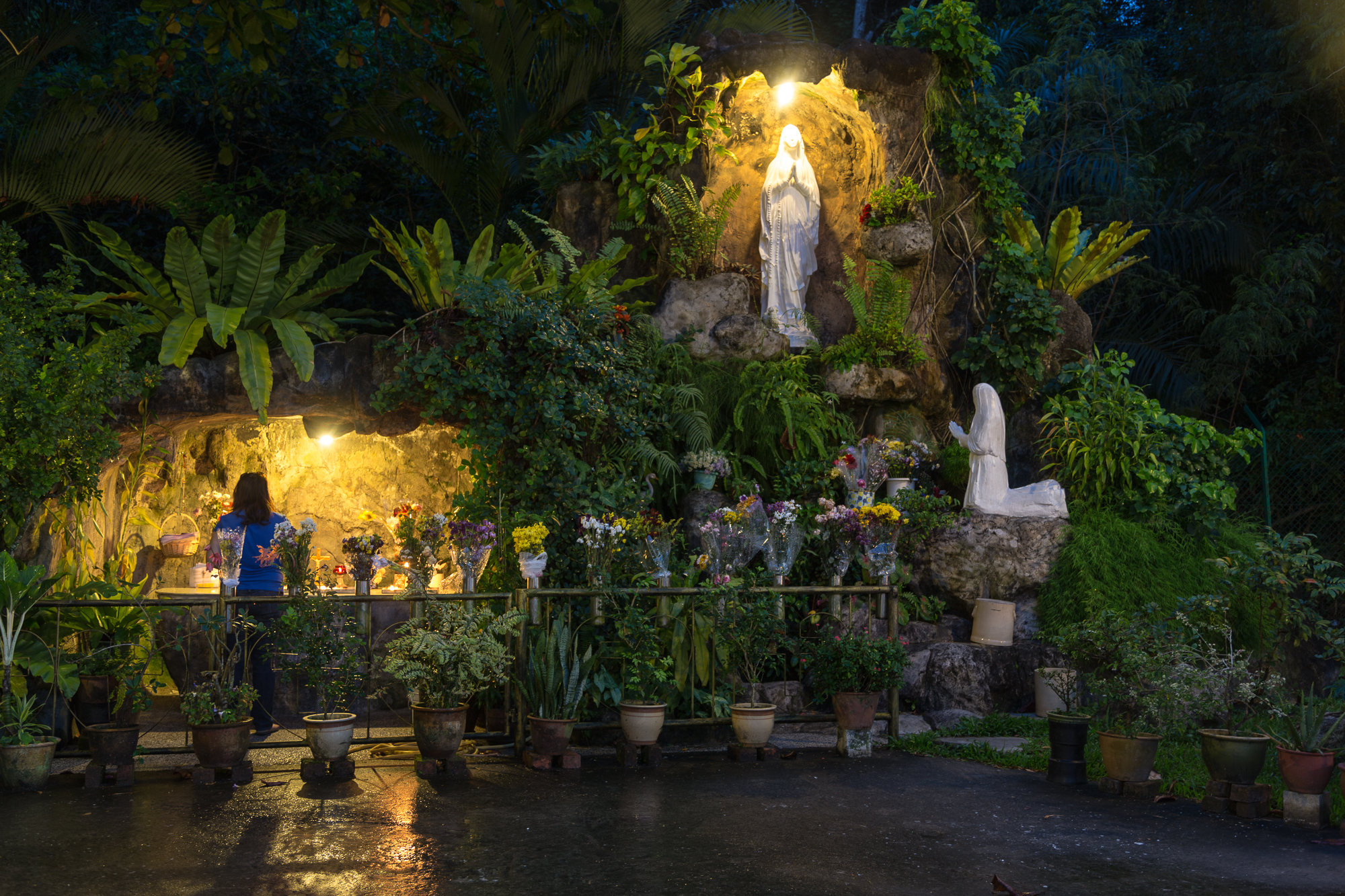
Marian Grotto

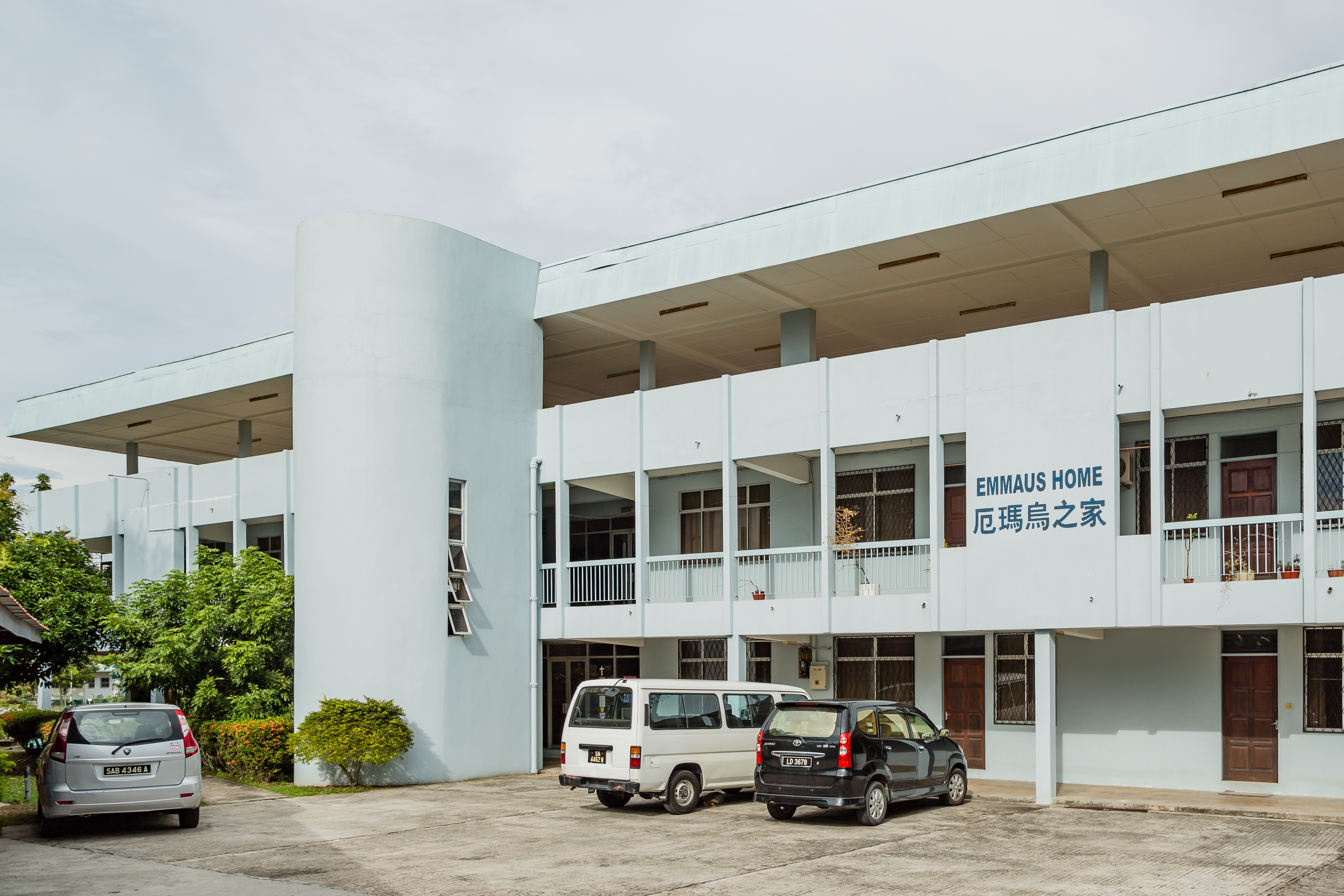
Emmaus Home

== See also ==
- List of cathedrals in Malaysia
