= Greater Kota Kinabalu =

Coordinates: 5.97668°N 116.09184°E

- Metropolitan area
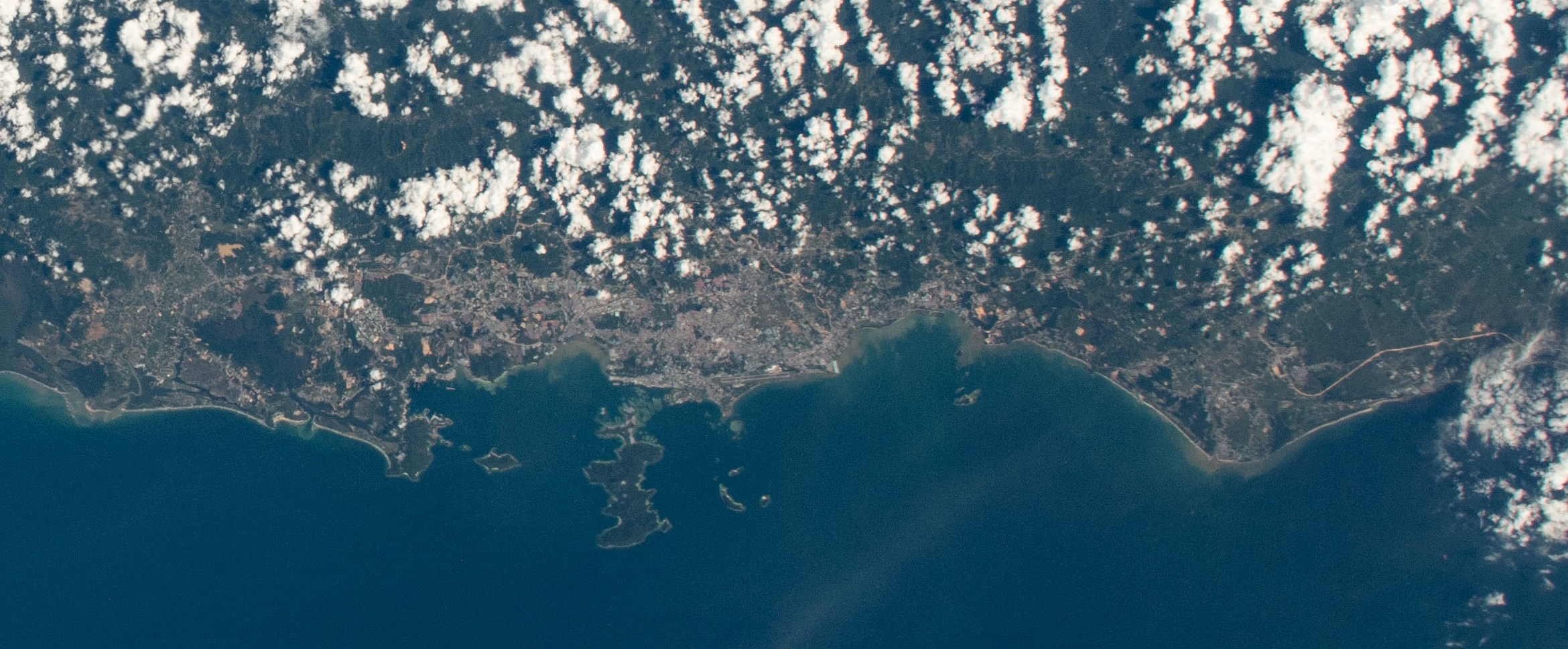
- Kota Kinabalu central business district in 2018.
- Interactive map of Greater Kota Kinabalu
- Country: Malaysia
- State: Sabah
- Division: West Coast

Area
  - Total: 3,277 km^{2} (1,265 sq mi)

Population (2019)
  - Total: 1,092,400
  - Density: 333/km^{2} (860/sq mi)
- Greater Kota Kinabalu Area: Kota Kinabalu; Penampang; Tuaran; Papar

Greater Kota Kinabalu refers to the dense clusters of regional populated areas surrounding the city of Kota Kinabalu in Malaysia. It comprises the districts of Kota Kinabalu (also the largest city and capital of Sabah), Penampang, Tuaran as well as Papar. These districts are also part of the West Coast Division. It was forecasted that in 2020, the combined population of these districts was 1.1 million people, in a combined area of 3,277 km^{2}.

== Definition and coverage ==
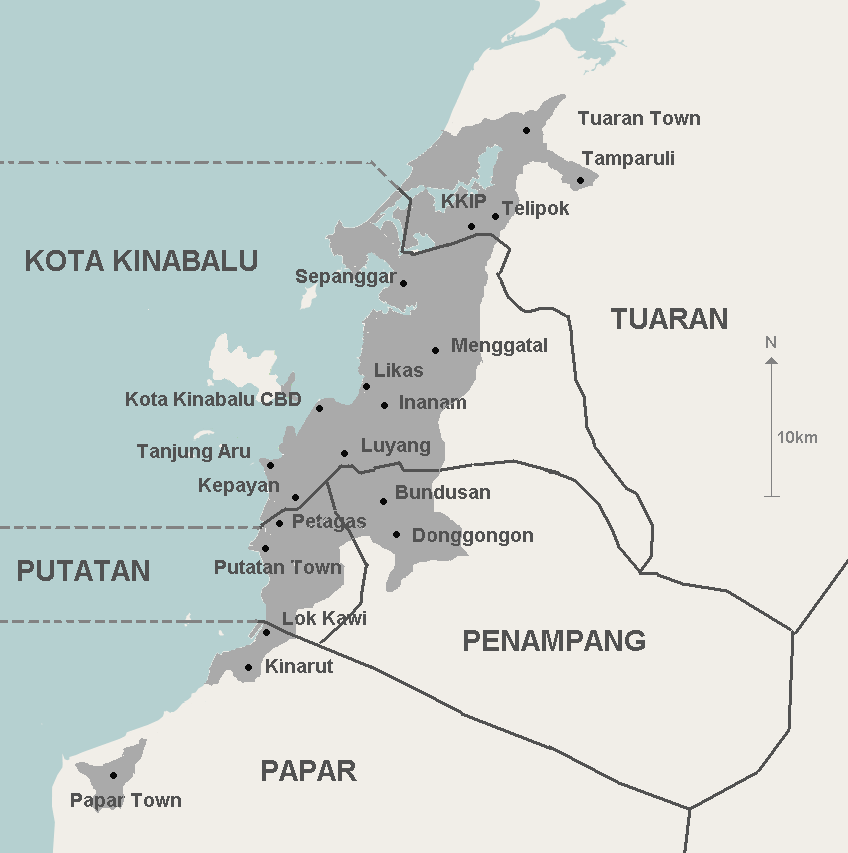
A rough representation of areas within Greater Kota Kinabalu. Lines indicate district boundaries. Grey highlighted areas indicate urbanised or populated areas.

The term was initially coined in a policy action document prepared by Sabah Economic Development and Investment Authority (SEDIA), a special body tasked to spearhead Sabah Development Corridor. The term is also used in the Sabah Structure Plan 2033, a statewide planning policy document that also includes the projected population growth trend in Kota Kinabalu and its immediate areas by the year 2033. Other usage of the term is by the Greater Kota Kinabalu Flood Prevention Committee. A report by the Federal Economic Planning Unit defines Greater Kota Kinabalu as an area comprising the districts of Kota Kinabalu and Penampang. However, the proximity of Greater Kota Kinabalu region to outlying districts of Tuaran and Papar suggests that the region's coverage may also include parts of the latter, as the urban centres of both districts are located within a one-hour commute from Kota Kinabalu Central Business District.

== Geography ==
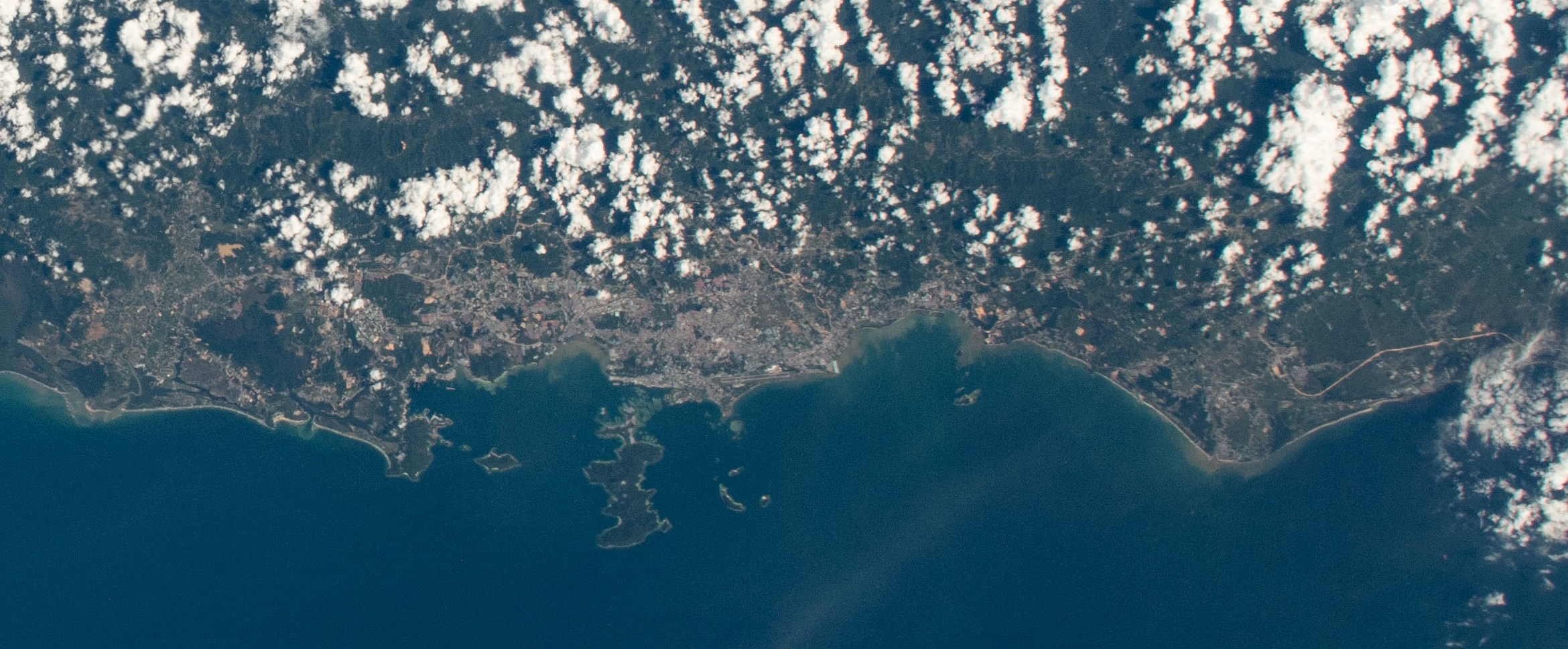
Greater Kota Kinabalu seen from the International Space Station (ISS) in January 2021.

Greater Kota Kinabalu region lies on the central west coast of Sabah. The region is bounded by the Crocker Range mountains immediately to the east and the South China Sea to the west. The region itself consists of a narrow coastal plain with an average width of 10 km, scattered with low-rise hills. The elevation ranges from sea level to near the peak of Mount Alab at 1,951 m above sea level. Offshore, there are several islands close to Kota Kinabalu Central Business District. Significant area of these islands is part of Tunku Abdul Rahman National Park. Mengalum Island is the furthest extent of dry land within Greater Kota Kinabalu region, at 56 km away from the Kota Kinabalu Central Business District.

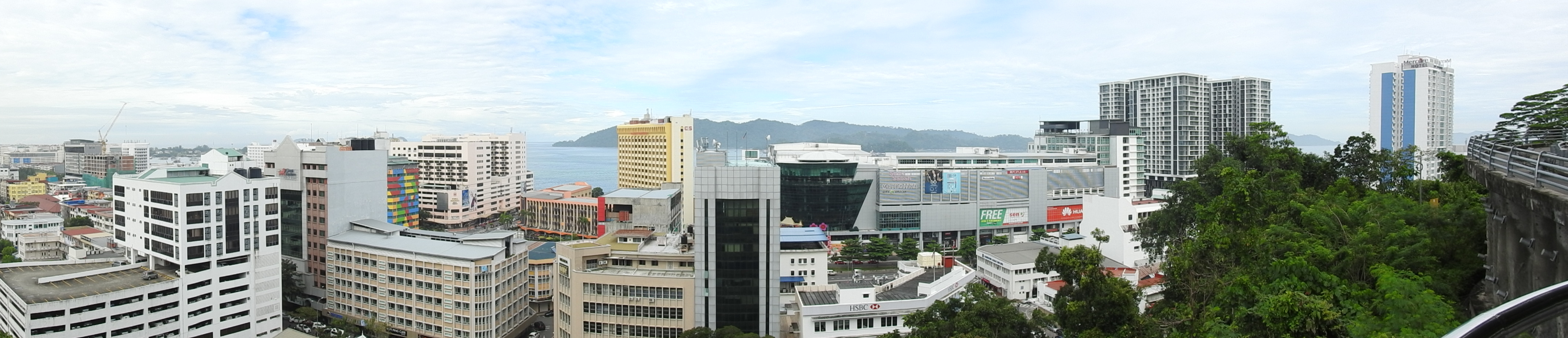
Kota Kinabalu Central Business District

== Population ==
In 2010, the population of Greater Kota Kinabalu was estimated at 855,556. Penampang (combined with Putatan sub-district) is the most densely populated district within the region, followed closely by Kota Kinabalu. It was forecasted that the combined population of these districts in 2020 was nearly 1.1 million.

| District | Area (km^{2}) | Population (2020) | Density (people/km^{2}) | Population (2010) | Density (people/km^{2}) |
|---|---|---|---|---|---|
| Kota Kinabalu | 352 | 572,704 | 1,627 | 452,058 | 1,284 |
| Penampang | 467 | 152,709 | 327 | 121,934 | 261 |
| Tuaran | 1,170 | 128,700 | 110 | 102,411 | 88 |
| Papar | 1,248 | 167,337 | 134 | 124,420 | 99 |
| Greater Kota Kinabalu | 3,277 | 1,092,970 | 3986 | 855,556 | 261 |

== Economy ==
Greater Kota Kinabalu is the primary economic and transportation hub in Sabah. The services sector is a major economic driver in Kota Kinabalu, Penampang, Papar and Tuaran. Since the 2010s, the services sector, particularly in tourism, hospitality and retail, has become a major economic driver in the region. Industrial activities are primarily concentrated in Kota Kinabalu adjacent to the city's primary transshipment port (in Sepanggar). In Tuaran and Papar, agriculture is more prevalent, including rice cultivation and oil palm plantations. Offshore, there are several active oil and gas drilling operations by major energy companies such as Petronas and Royal Dutch Shell.

== Population centres ==
=== Kota Kinabalu city ===
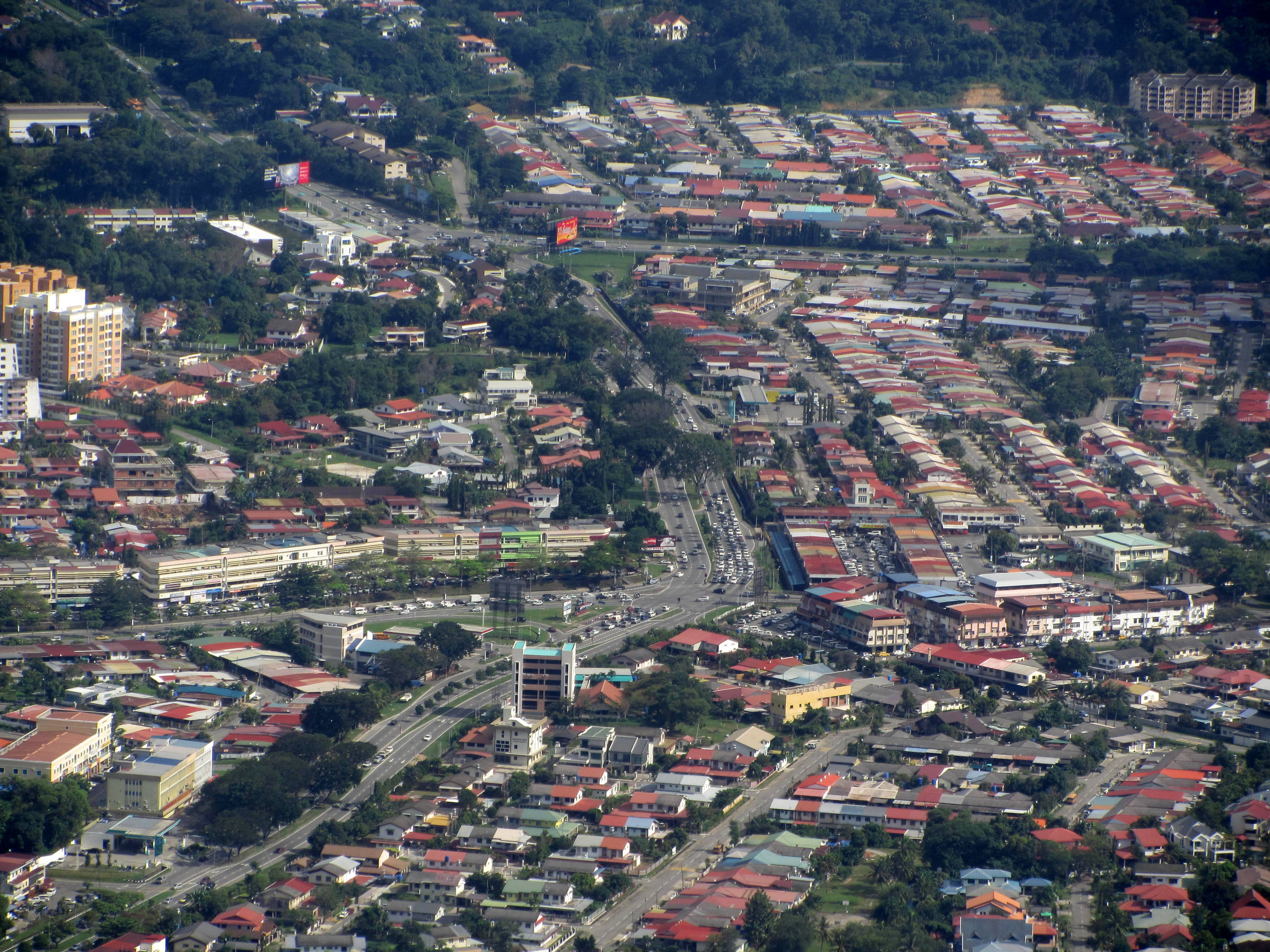
Aerial view of Luyang.

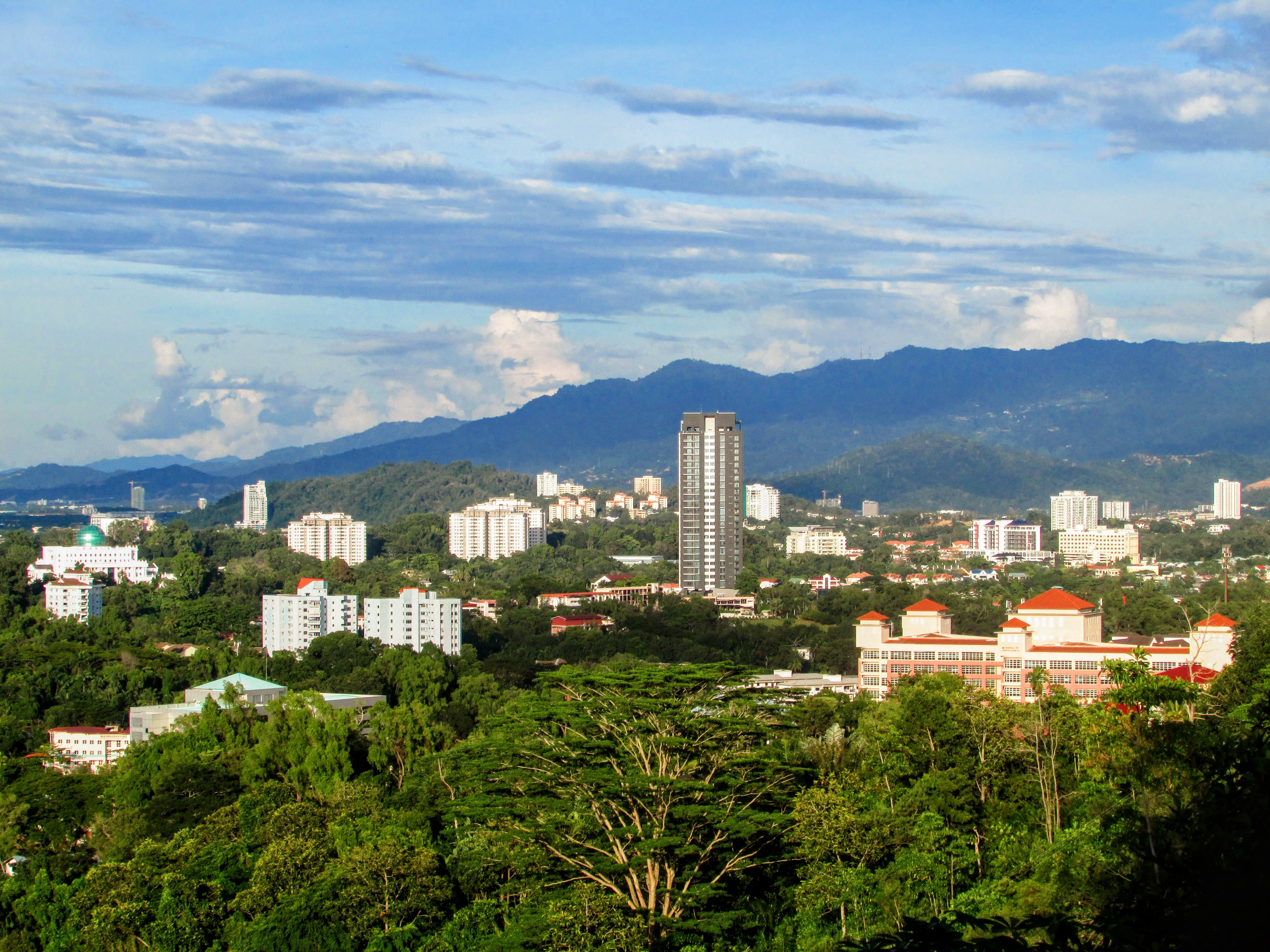
Crocker Range dominates the region to the east.

- Kota Kinabalu Central Business District
- Luyang
  - Damai
  - Lintas
  - Foh Sang
- Sembulan
- Tanjung Aru
- Kepayan
  - Lido/Kepayan Ridge
- Likas
- Inanam
  - Kolombong
- Menggatal
  - Alamesra
  - Sepanggar
- Telipok
  - Kota Kinabalu Industrial Park (KKIP)

=== Penampang municipality ===
- Donggongon
- Bandar Penampang Baru (Koidupan-Noosob-Puluduk)
- Bundusan
- Kasigui

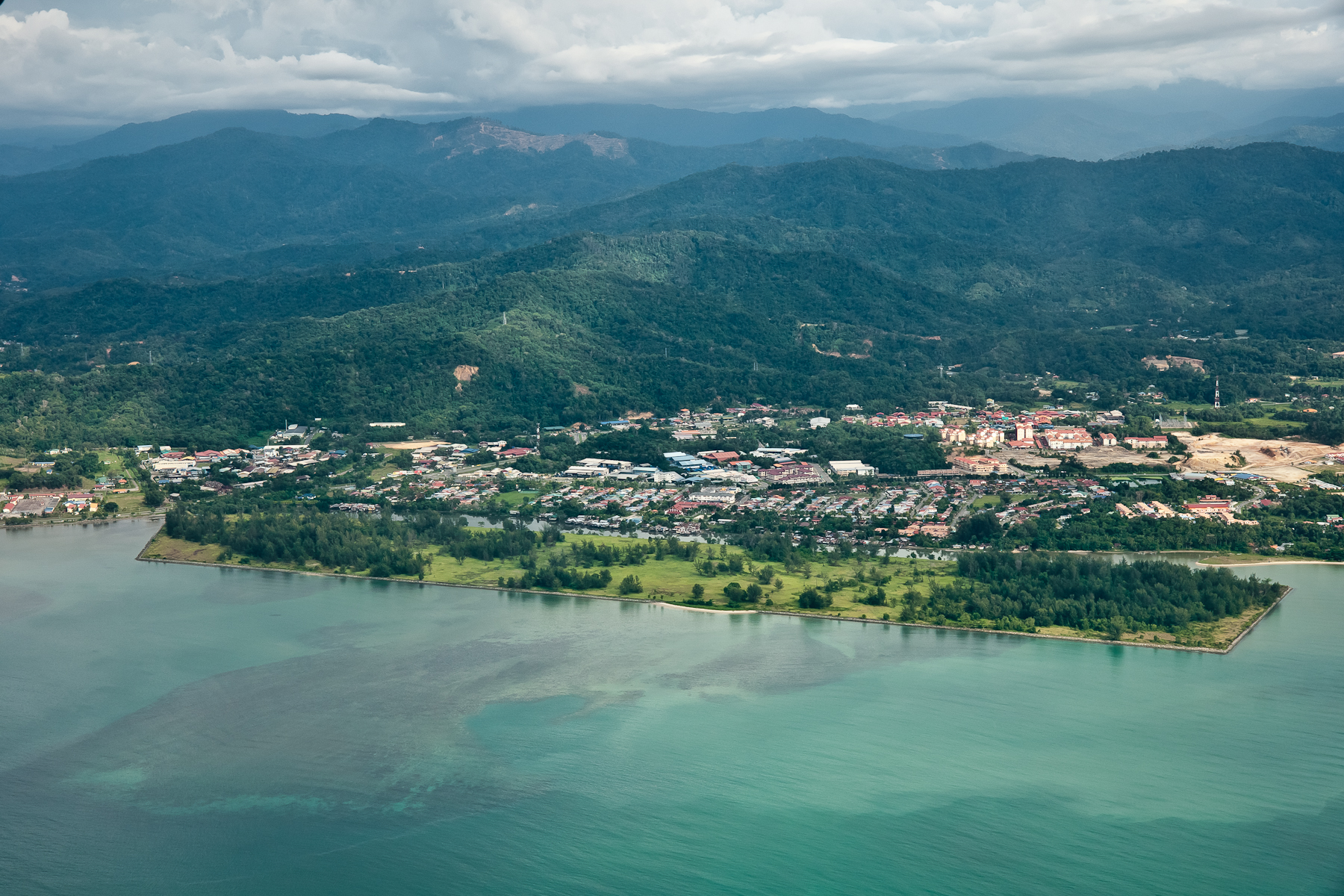
Lok Kawi area in Putatan sub-district of the Penampang municipality.

- Petagas
- Putatan
- Lok Kawi

=== Tuaran district ===
- Tuaran
- Tamparuli
- Kiulu
- Tenghilan

=== Papar district ===
- Kinarut
- Papar
- Benoni
- Kimanis
- Bongawan

== Transportation ==
=== Air ===
- Kota Kinabalu International Airport

=== Sea ===
- Sapangar Bay Container Port
- Sapangar Bay Oil Terminal
- Kota Kinabalu Port
- Jesselton Point Ferry Terminal
- Sabah Oil and Gas Terminal

=== Major roads ===
- FT 1 Federal Route 1 (Sabah)
- FT 22 Federal Route 22
- FT 500 Federal Route 500
- FT 501 Federal Route 501
- FT 503 Federal Route 503

=== Mass transit ===
- Western Sabah Railway Line

== Administration ==
There are four local governments within Greater Kota Kinabalu region:

- Kota Kinabalu City Hall (KK city center area; large parts of KK North comprising Telipok, Sepanggar, Manggatal and Inanam and also most of KK South comprising Tanjung Aru as well as Kepayan)
- Penampang/Putatan Municipal Council (KK South; covering a portion of the Kepayan suburb of Kota Kinabalu city)
- Tuaran District Council (KK North; covers a portion of the Telipok suburb of Kota Kinabalu city since most of it falls under KK City Hall's jurisdiction)
- Papar District Council (KK South)

== Subsequent usage ==
Usage of the term 'Greater Kota Kinabalu' slowly gained traction in recent years, especially in the real estate sector. Because of the separate administrative jurisdictions within Greater Kota Kinabalu, the term is not an officially recognised statistical area by the Department of Statistics Malaysia; therefore population data remains based on individual districts. Despite the usage of the term in some public policy documents, there is no dedicated single body that represents or governs Greater Kota Kinabalu to address shared challenges such as population growth and development impact on sensitive areas. Hence, present socio-economic policies tend to focus on Kota Kinabalu district, rather than the wider area of Greater Kota Kinabalu. The increasing socio-economic integration and interdependency among the districts of Kota Kinabalu, Penampang, Tuaran and Papar have been recognised in other ways, thus suggesting the feasibility of Greater Kota Kinabalu as an inter-dependent socio-economic regional entity.

=== Water resource conflict ===
In 2018, the Sabah government proposed a water supply dam in Upper Papar, a sparsely populated area on the foothills of the Crocker Range in Papar. The proposal was a long-term measure to meet the expected increase in demand on the state's west coast. The Member of Parliament for Papar supported the proposal as a catalyst to increase development in the west coast and attract investment, especially in Papar. The proposal was met with fierce objection by the locals residing in the area, as the project would mean a loss of land settled for generations. The controversy surrounding the project partly contributed to the defeat of the Warisan-led state government in the 2020 Sabah state election. Currently, there is no indication that the project is cancelled.

=== 2020–2021 pandemic movement control order ===
Since October 2020, as part of the strategies to stem COVID-19 infection, inter-district travel restriction has been imposed periodically throughout Sabah. However, the districts of Kota Kinabalu, Penampang and Papar are grouped into a single 'unified' district and residents between these districts are allowed to move freely without restriction. This is because socio-economic activities and movements between these districts are highly intertwined and imposing restriction on a basis of individual district would have caused further economic disruption. As the infection rate slows, the inter-district travel restriction is further loosened into zoning restriction, whereby restriction of movement is based on zones. The entire West Coast Division, comprising the districts of Kota Kinabalu, Penampang, Tuaran, Papar, Kota Belud and Ranau, is grouped into a single zone. Travel between districts within a zone is not restricted.

== See also ==
Metropolitan areas of Malaysia

- Greater Kuala Lumpur
  - Klang Valley
- Greater Kuching
- George Town Conurbation
- Johor Bahru Conurbation
- Kinta Valley
