= KKIA@Kimanis =

Proposed airport in Sabah, Malaysia

- IATA: none; ICAO: none

Summary
- Airport type: Public
- Serves: Greater Kota Kinabalu (also West Coast and Interior divisions of Sabah)
- Location: Kampung Mandahan, Kimanis, Papar, Sabah, Malaysia
- Time zone: MST (UTC+08:00)

KKIA@Kimanis refers to a proposed international airport project in Kimanis, Sabah, Malaysia, intended to replace the existing Kota Kinabalu International Airport (KKIA). The proposed location for the new airport is in Kampung Mandahan, Kimanis, Papar, approximately 59 kilometers from Kota Kinabalu. The feasibility study for the project was undertaken by Berjaya Land, following a Memorandum of Understanding (MOU) signed in June 2022 with Qhazanah Sabah Berhad, a state-owned strategic investment arm of Sabah.

== Development and planning ==
The initial stages of the project involved discussions with various government authorities, including the Public Works Department (Jabatan Kerja Raya, JKR), the Department of Environment (Jabatan Alam Sekitar, JAS), and the Civil Aviation Authority of Malaysia (CAAM). By May 2023, Datuk Dr. Yusof Yacob, Chairman of Qhazanah Sabah Berhad, indicated that a second feasibility study on the relocation of KKIA to Kimanis was nearing completion. By July 2023, the feasibility study had been finalized and submitted to the Sabah Economic Planning Unit (EPU) for review before being forwarded to the State Cabinet for approval.

The proposed development in Kimanis was intended to cover an area of 6,070.5 hectares. Of this, 2,023.5 hectares were designated for the airport, with the remaining land allocated for supporting services, including the development of an airport city, industrial zones, and residential areas. The plans also included expansion programs for Maintenance, Repair, and Overhaul (MRO) services and the establishment of an aviation training center.

== Public and political response ==
The proposal to relocate KKIA to Kimanis was met with widespread opposition. Sabah's Chief Minister, Hajiji Noor, expressed in January 2024 that the current KKIA could remain operational for at least another 7 to 10 years, thereby negating the immediate need for relocation. He also dismissed the notion of relocating the airport solely to facilitate the construction of more skyscrapers in Kota Kinabalu.

In March 2024, the Federal Minister of Transport, Anthony Loke, confirmed in Parliament that the Malaysian Federal Government had no plans to pursue the relocation. Instead, the government would focus on expanding the current airport to meet future needs. Loke cited concerns over the distance of the proposed site from Kota Kinabalu and the significant financial costs involved in the construction of a new airport.

== Criticism ==
The proposal for the new airport faced substantial criticism from various stakeholders, including the general public, transportation experts, and politicians from multiple parties. Common concerns included:

- Necessity: Critics questioned the need for a new airport, as data did not indicate that the current KKIA was operating at or near capacity.
- Location: The rural location of the proposed site, approximately 60 kilometers from Kota Kinabalu, was deemed inconvenient, especially due to the lack of public transportation between the two locations.
- Cost and Inconvenience: The added expenses and inconveniences of traveling between Kota Kinabalu and the new airport were highlighted as major drawbacks.
- Public Transport: The absence of public transportation between Kota Kinabalu and the proposed site was a significant concern, with no assurances from the state government that such infrastructure would be developed.
- Priorities: Critics argued that Sabah had more pressing infrastructural needs, and limited resources should be allocated to those projects.
- Current Airport Benefits: The existing KKIA’s proximity to downtown Kota Kinabalu and its seaside location, which facilitates future expansion, were cited as strong reasons to retain the airport in its current location.
- Economic Impact: Concerns were raised about the potential economic impact on Kota Kinabalu, including the loss of job opportunities, should the airport be relocated.

Many viewed the proposed new airport as an unnecessary project that could become a "white elephant" — a costly but underused or abandoned infrastructure.

== Political opposition ==
The proposal also faced political backlash. Political parties such as UMNO and Parti Warisan Sabah voiced their opposition, as did Chan Foong Hin, the Member of Parliament for Kota Kinabalu. Chan raised concerns about the transparency of the appointment process for Berjaya Land, which had been awarded the feasibility study, alleging that multiple contracts had been awarded to the company without an open tender process.

== Facilities and connectivity ==
If constructed, the new airport would have featured at least two runways and additional hangar facilities for general aviation. The airport would have been connected to Kota Kinabalu via the Pan-Borneo Highway (WP04) and Malaysia Federal Route 1. However, at the time of the proposal, no public transportation links between Kota Kinabalu and the proposed site had been established or confirmed.

== Conclusion ==
As of March 2024, the plan to relocate Kota Kinabalu International Airport to Kimanis has been effectively shelved, with both state and federal authorities opting to focus on expanding the existing airport instead. The widespread opposition, both from the public and within political circles, played a significant role in halting the project.

== See also ==
- Kota Kinabalu International Airport
- Kimanis
