= Malaysia Monument =

Monument in Kota Kinabalu

- Tugu Peringatan Malaysia 馬來西亞建國紀念
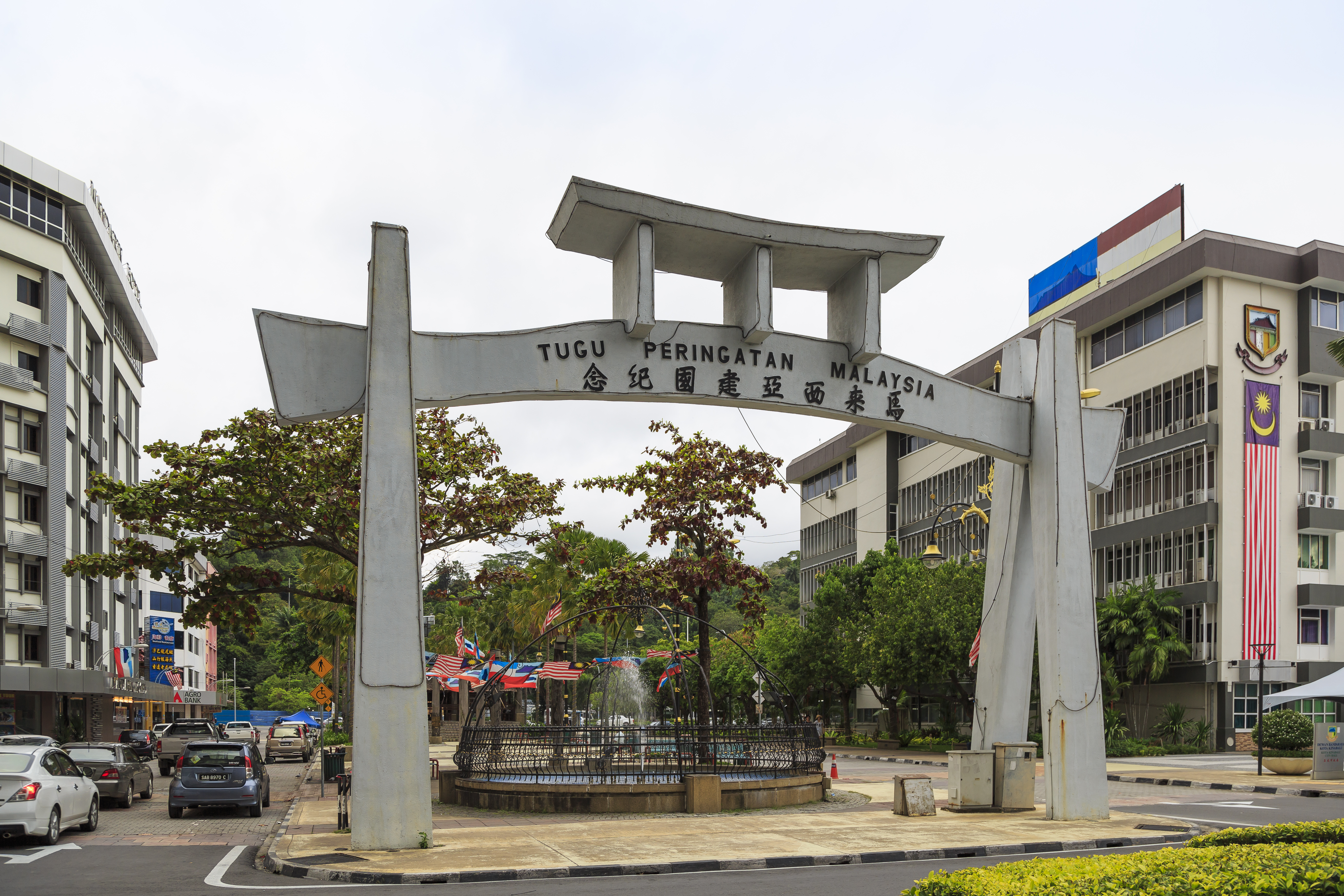
- Interactive map of the Malaysia Monument area

General information
- Type: Monument
- Location: Kota Kinabalu, Sabah, Malaysia
- Coordinates: 5°58′56″N 116°04′32″E
- Completed: 16 September 1963
- Cost: $11,000
- Management: Kota Kinabalu City Hall

The Malaysia Monument is a structure in Kota Kinabalu, Sabah, erected to commemorate the formation of Malaysia in 1963. The monument was sponsored by the local Chinese community and is located near the Kota Kinabalu City Hall, where it is still used as part of Malaysia Day celebrations.

== History ==
In 1963, the Malaysia Agreement was signed, which saw North Borneo (now Sabah) join the Federation of Malaya to form Malaysia. The Chinese community of Jesselton (now Kota Kinabalu), the capital of North Borneo, discussed several proposals to commemorate the union, eventually agreeing 20 days before the expected union date of 16 September (what would become Malaysia Day) to erect a permanent memorial. A monument was quickly constructed in time for the event. It was unveiled by the first governor of Sabah, Datu Mustapha Datu Harun.

The monument degraded over time, and its original plaque went missing, perhaps being stolen. Restoration works funded by government funds allocated to Assemblywoman Christina Liew finished before Malaysia Day in 2019. These added a fountain and coloured lights near the monument. Liew was at the time Deputy Chief Minister and Minister of Tourism, Culture and Environment and noted the monument's relevance to local history and tourism.

The monument continues to play a role in local Malaysia Day celebrations. There are proposals to designate the monument as a cultural heritage site. It is currently managed by the city council.

== Location ==
The monument is located in Deasoka Square, a busy area near the Kota Kinabalu City Hall. It was initially built near the Keng Chew Association.

== Design ==
The monument cost $11,000. It reflects Chinese design and has text in Chinese, English, and Malay.

A plaque on the monument is inscribed in English and Chinese with "Sponsored By North Borneo Chinese Association & Jesselton Chinese Chamber of Commerce. This Monument Is Built By The People Of Jesselton To The Founding of Malaysia on 16th September 1963".

== Gallery ==
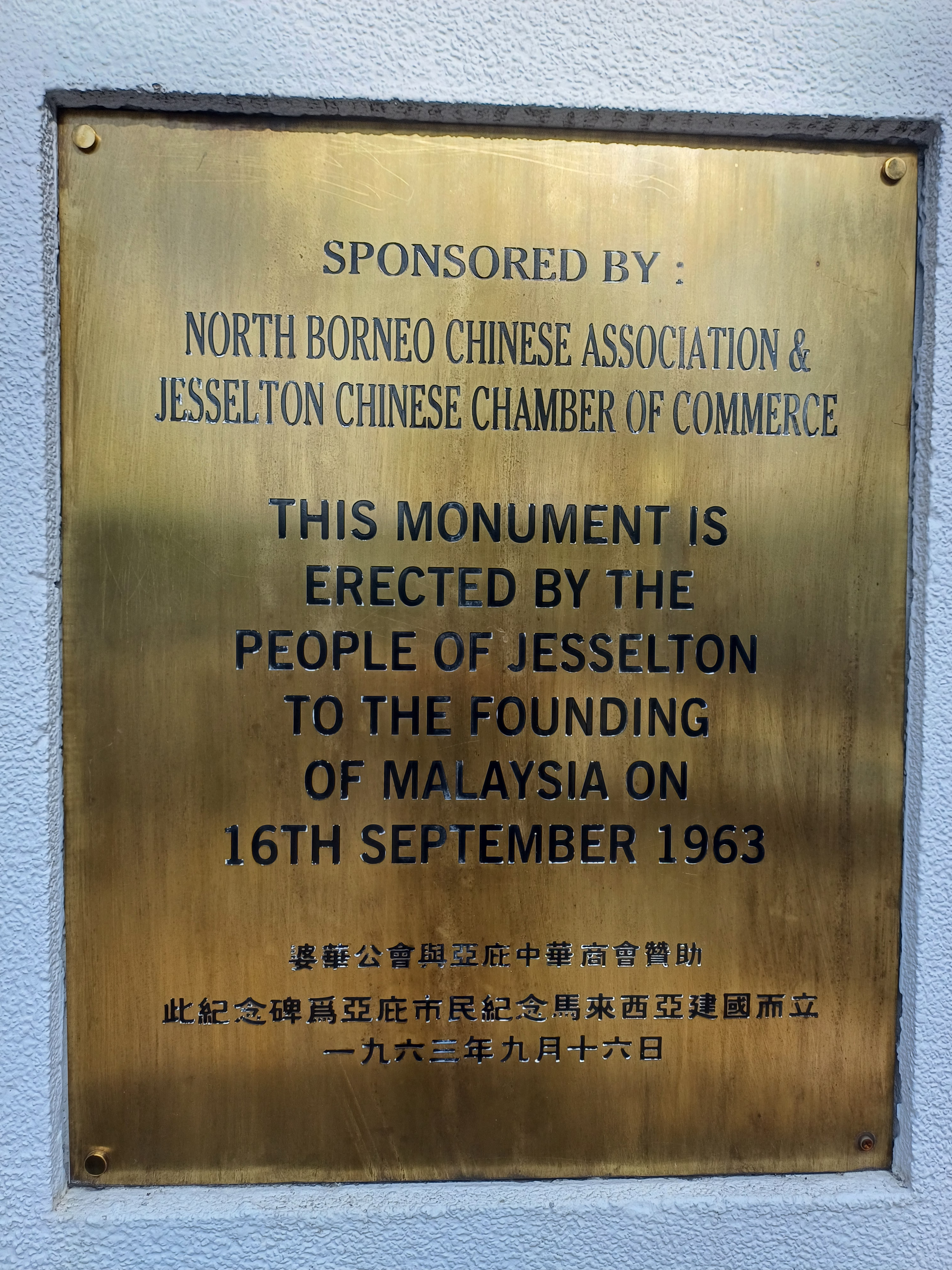
Plaque on the monument

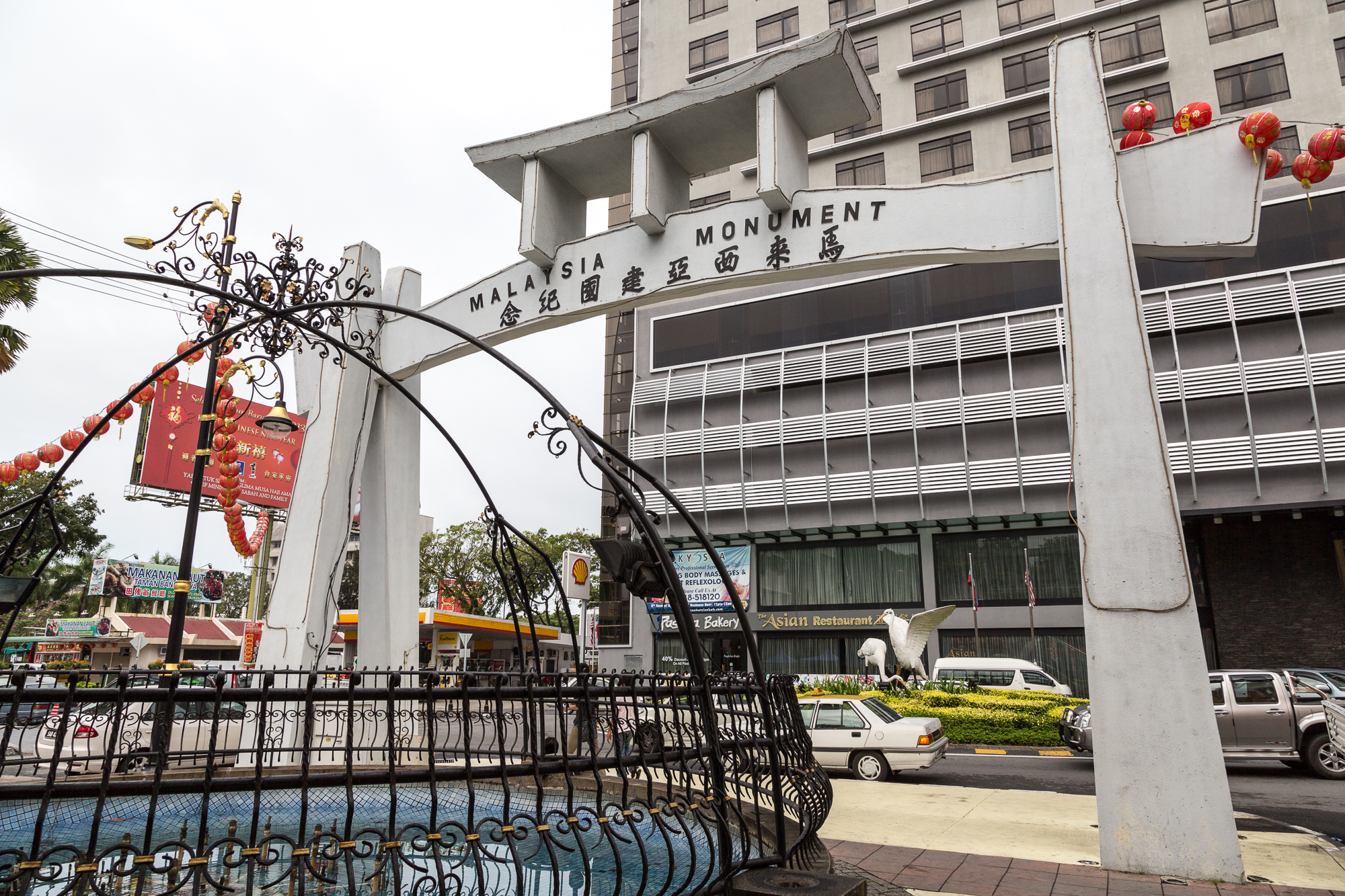
Fountain in front of the monument
