= Alamesra =

- Urban Area
- Alamesra; Alamesra
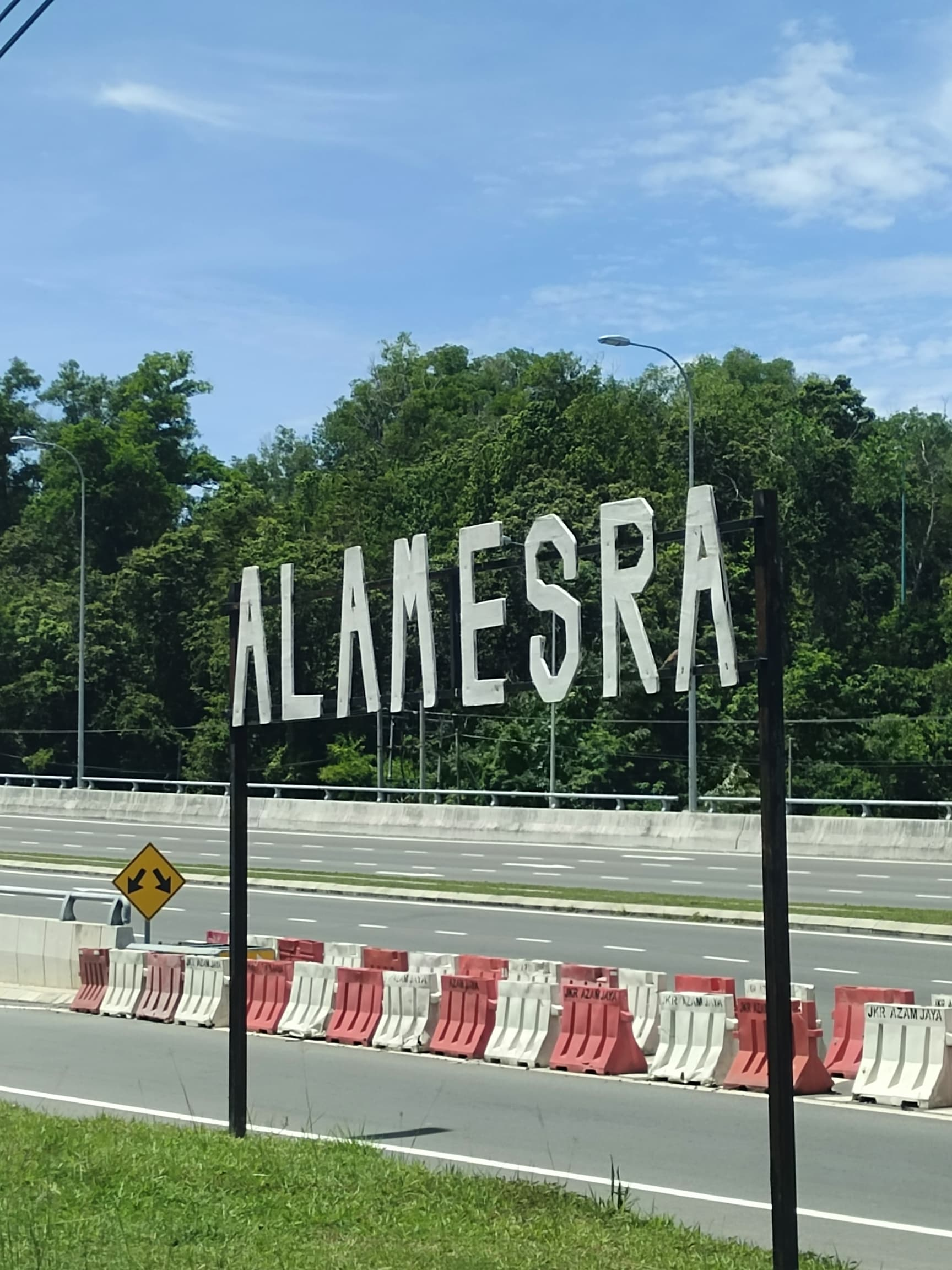
- Alamesra sign along the Sulaman-Coastal Highway
- Country: Malaysia
- State: Sabah
- Division: West Coast
- District: Kota Kinabalu
- Administration: Kota Kinabalu City Hall

Government
  - Body: Kota Kinabalu City Hall
- Time zone: UTC+8 (MST)
- Postal code: 88XXX
- Area code: 088
- Neighbourhood Area: Sepanggar, Manggatal, Kingfisher Plaza

Alamesra is an urban area located in Kota Kinabalu District, Sabah. Strategically situated in the new Kota Kinabalu Industrial Park (KKIP) development corridor along the Sulaman-Coastal Highway. It is located opposite the University Malaysia Sabah (UMS) campus and adjacent to 1-Borneo, a popular shopping mall. Situated in Alamesra, Kota Kinabalu, Alamestra Plaza Utama is a commercial complex made up of 7 blocks of three- to four-storey shop offices with 55 units. The development was completed in November 2016.
