= Sabah Oil and Gas Terminal =

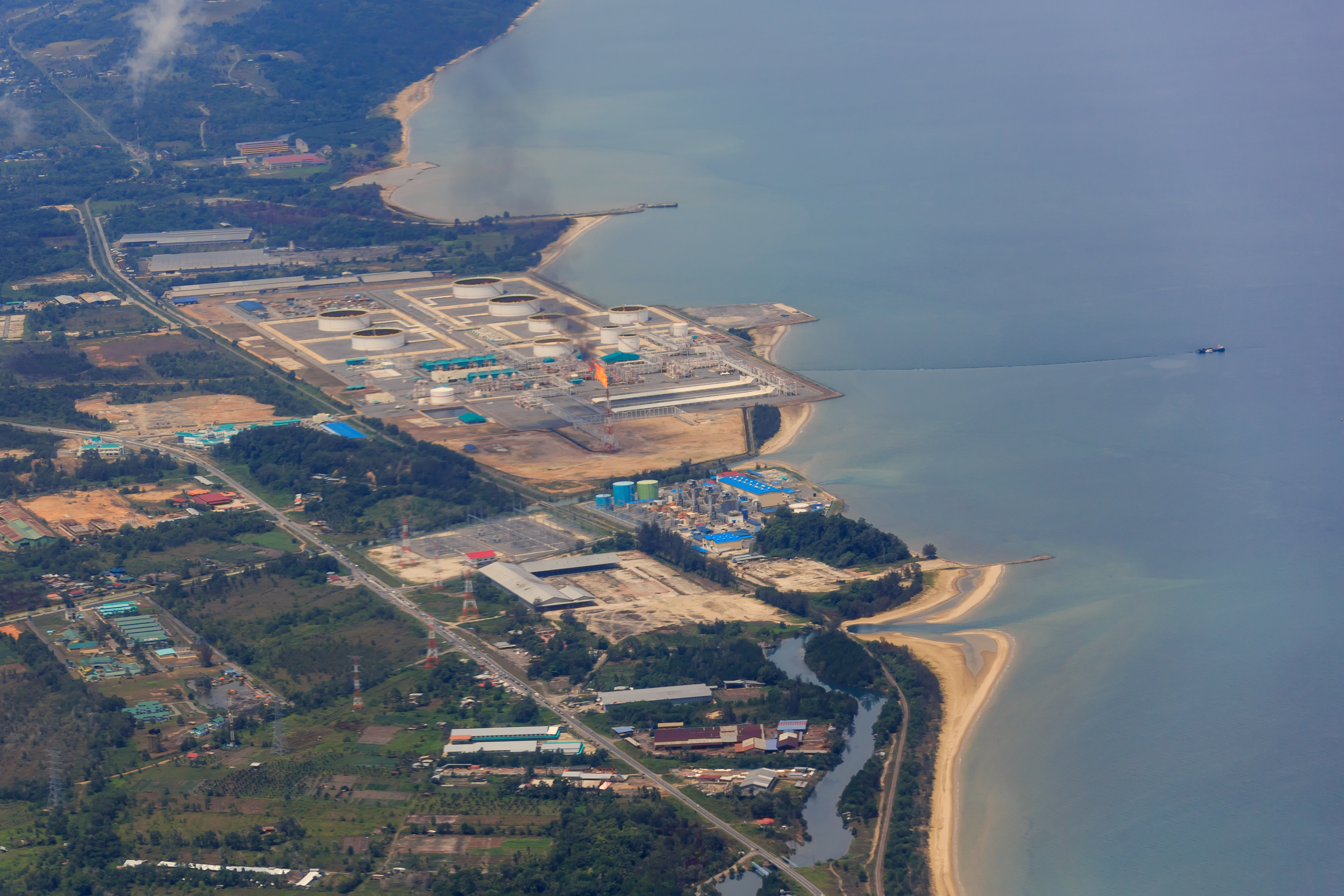
- The terminal as photographed in 2014.
- Interactive map of the Sabah Oil and Gas Terminal area
- Alternative names: SOGT

General information
- Type: Oil and gas terminal
- Coordinates: 5.6367°N 115.8885°E
- Current tenants: Petronas
- Groundbreaking: 2007
- Construction started: 2011
- Completed: 2014
- Cost: RM2.4 billion ($752.16 million)
- Owner: Sabah State Government

Sabah Oil and Gas Terminal (SOGT) is a terminal located in Kimanis, Papar District, Sabah, Malaysia. The terminal handles the production of oil and gas from the West Coast Field in South China Sea facing the western coast of Sabah, which covering the operations of Sabah Gas Terminal, Labuan Crude Oil Terminal and the Labuan Gas Terminal. Covering an area of about 250 acres, with a capacity to handle up to 300,000 barrels of crude oil per day and 1.0 billion standard cubic feet of gas per day. The terminal stores oil before it is transported by tanker. The terminal is also connected to another terminal in neighbouring Sarawak through the Sabah–Sarawak Gas Pipeline.

== History ==
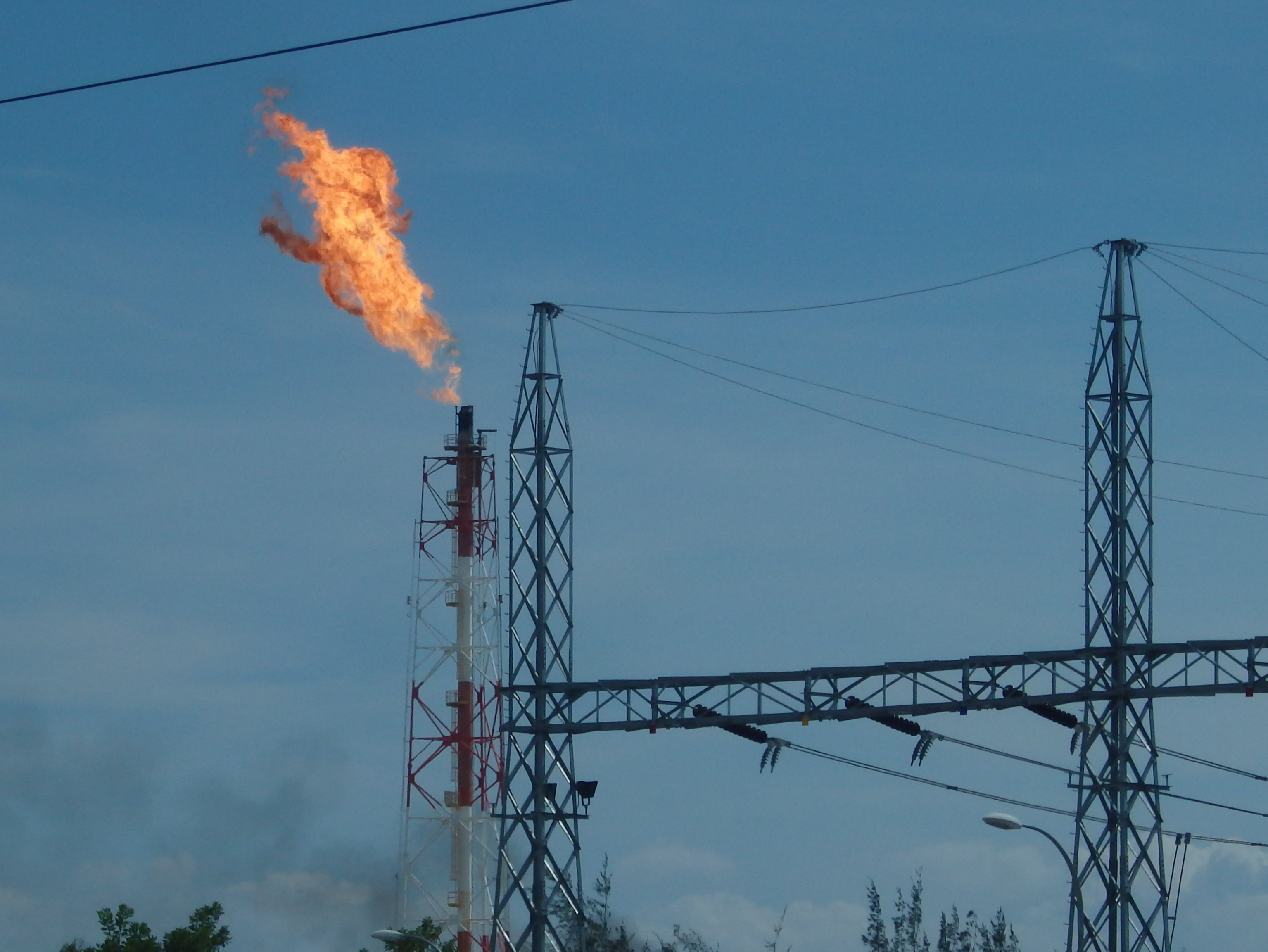
Oil refinery fire tower at the terminal.

The proposal to build the terminal has been put forward since 2005. The ground-breaking was officiated by Prime Minister Abdullah Ahmad Badawi in 2007. In 2010, South Korean-company Samsung Engineering signed a $770 million contract with Petronas to jointly develop the project. A Sarawak-based Malaysian construction company, Naim Holdings Berhad also entered the joint venture with the project was finally complete in 2014.
