= Kota Kinabalu International Airport =

Airport serving Kota Kinabalu, Sabah, Malaysia

Kota Kinabalu International Airport Lapangan Terbang Antarabangsa Kota Kinabalu
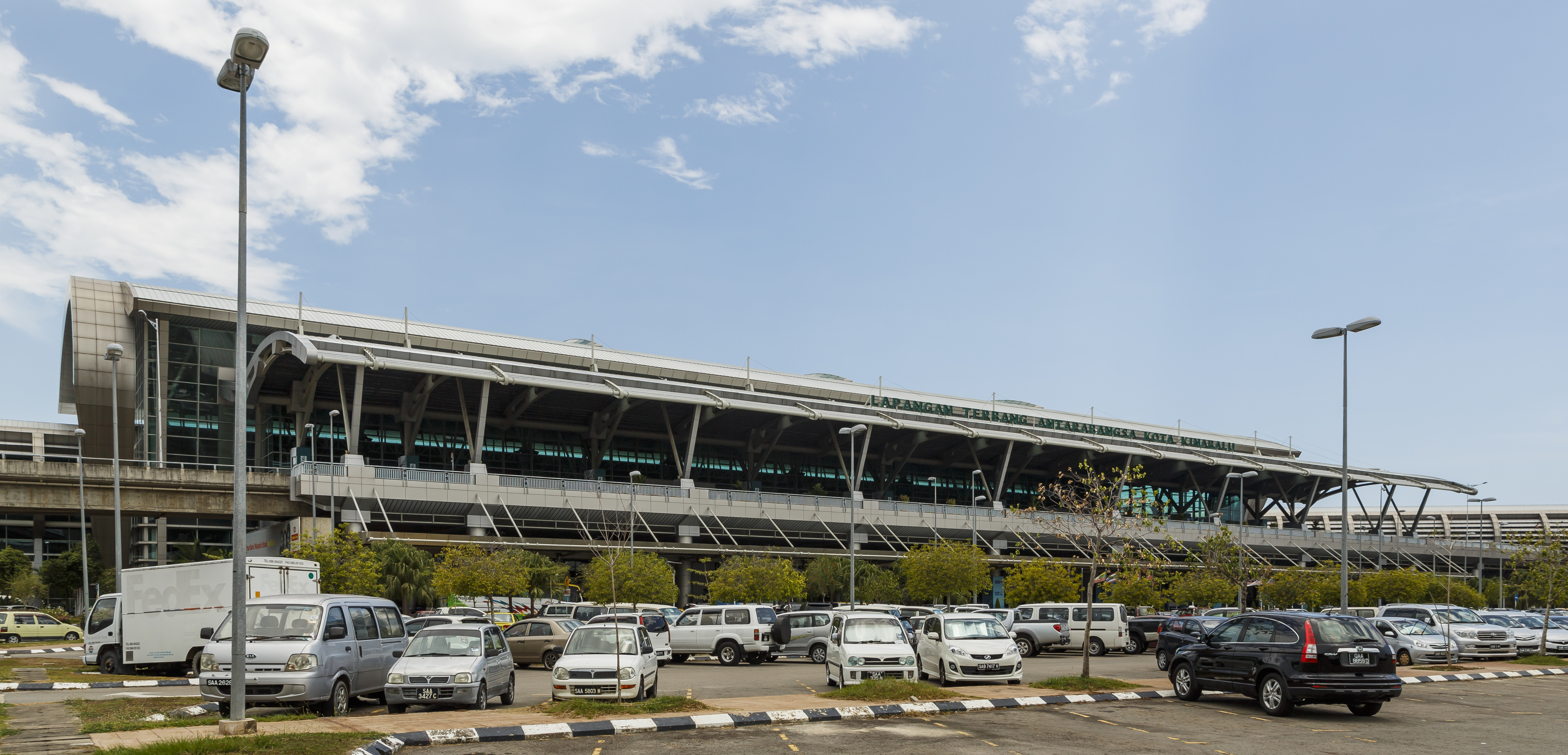
- IATA: BKI; ICAO: WBKK; WMO: 96471

Summary
- Airport type: Public
- Owner: Khazanah Nasional
- Operator: Malaysia Airports
- Serves: Greater Kota Kinabalu (also West Coast and Interior divisions of Sabah)
- Location: Kepayan and Tanjung Aru, Kota Kinabalu, Sabah, Malaysia
- Hub for: AirBorneo; Firefly; Malaysia Airlines
- Operating base for: AirAsia
- Time zone: MST (UTC+08:00)
- Elevation AMSL: 10 ft (3.0 m)
- Coordinates: 5°55′57″N 116°2′57″E
- Website: airports.malaysiaairports.com.my/kota-kinabalu

Map
- Location in Sabah state Location in East Malaysia Location in Borneo Location in Malaysia Location in Southeast Asia

Runways
Direction	Length		Surface
Direction	m	ft	Surface
02/20	3,780	12,402	Asphalt

Statistics (2024)
- Passengers: 7,954,338 (▲11.44%)
- Cargo (tonnes): 54,154 (▼4.8%)
- Aircraft movements: 63,260 (▲4.38%)
- Source: official website AIP Malaysia

Kota Kinabalu International Airport (KKIA) (IATA: BKI, ICAO: WBKK) is an international airport in Kota Kinabalu, the state capital of Sabah, Malaysia, approximately 8 km (5.0 mi) southwest of the city centre. In 2024, the airport handled over 7.95 million passengers, making it the second busiest airport in Malaysia after Kuala Lumpur International Airport in terms of both passenger and aircraft movements, though the number fell short of its peak in 2019, when it recorded over 9 million passengers. It is also the third busiest in Malaysia for cargo.

As the primary gateway to East Malaysia, KKIA serves as the main hub for MASwings and a secondary hub for Firefly and Malaysia Airlines. Additionally, it is the second largest hub for AirAsia Malaysia, after KLIA2. The airport is also home to several general aviation companies, including Sabah Air Aviation, Sabah Flying Club, Sazma Aviation and Layang Layang Aerospace, which have established their main bases at KKIA.

== History ==
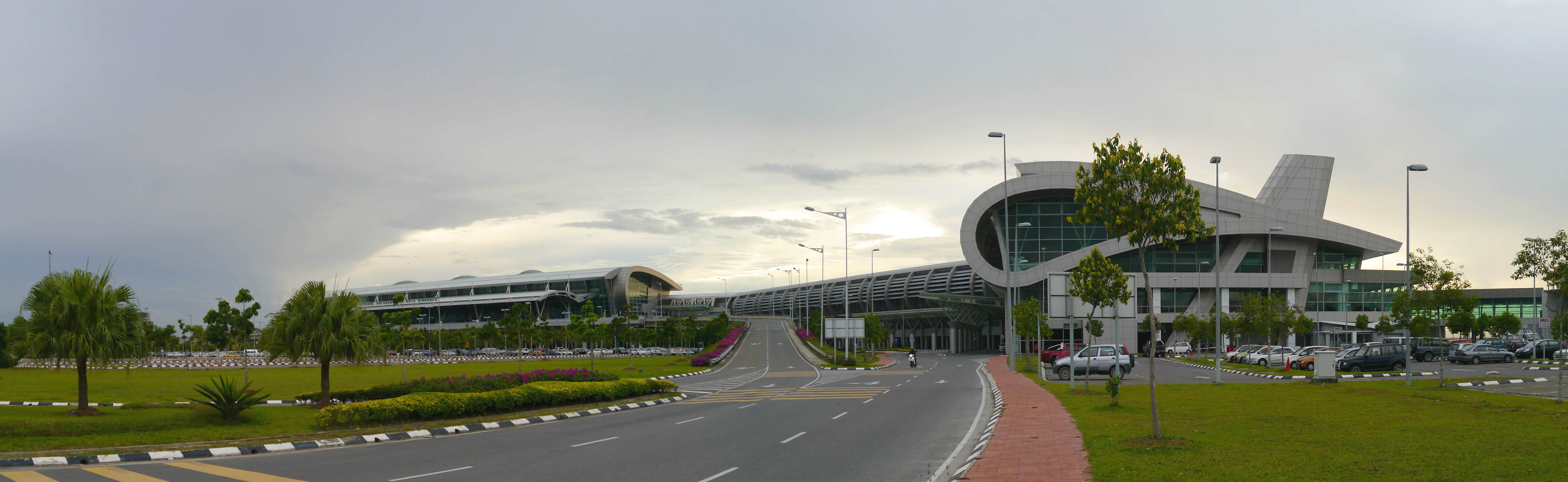
Wide shot of Terminal 1.

=== Military airfield and post-war development ===
The airport began as a military airfield built by the Imperial Japanese Army during World War II. It was originally known as Jesselton Airfield, with Kota Kinabalu then being called Jesselton. The airfield suffered significant damage from Allied bombings towards the end of the war. After the war, the Department of Civil Aviation (DCA) of North Borneo, which later became part of Malaysia's Sabah state, took over the airport's operation and maintenance.

With the end of the war, Jesselton Airfield was rehabilitated for civilian use. The Department of Civil Aviation began overseeing its operations and maintenance. This marked the beginning of its transition from a military installation to a public airport, laying the foundation for future commercial air travel in the region.

=== Transition to civil aviation ===
Regular passenger services commenced in May 1949 with a weekly flight operated by Malayan Airways from Singapore, stopping at Kuching and Labuan. The route was extended to Sandakan in September 1949. By 1950, the airport became a stopover point for biweekly flights between Hong Kong and Labuan, via Manila and Sandakan, operated by Cathay Pacific.

As domestic air travel grew, Sabah Airways Limited (later known as Borneo Airways) started operations in 1953, connecting Kota Kinabalu to other towns in Sabah, including Sandakan, Kudat, Ranau, Keningau and Tawau. This expansion significantly boosted the airport's importance as a regional hub.

With increasing air traffic and the need to accommodate larger aircraft, the airport began significant infrastructure upgrades. By 1957, the airport's original grass strip runway was resurfaced with bitumen, and a new terminal was constructed. This marked the beginning of the airport's transformation into a modern facility capable of handling more frequent commercial flights.

The runway underwent further extensions in the following years. By 1959, the runway was lengthened to 1,593 meters, allowing the operation of turboprop aircraft like the Malayan Airways turboprop Viscount aircraft. In 1963, the runway was lengthened again to 1,921 meters to accommodate the Comet 4 operated by Malaysian Airways.

As passenger traffic grew, the need for a larger terminal became apparent. In 1967, Cathay Pacific began operating a twice-weekly Convair 880 jet service to Hong Kong with a stop in Manila.

=== Corporatisation and modernisation ===
In 1992, the Department of Civil Aviation of Sabah was corporatised, and Malaysia Airports Holdings Berhad took over the management of KKIA. A major expansion project for both terminals began in 2006, with Terminal 1 undergoing renovation and the runway extended to 3,780 meters, allowing the airport to accommodate larger aircraft like the Airbus A380.

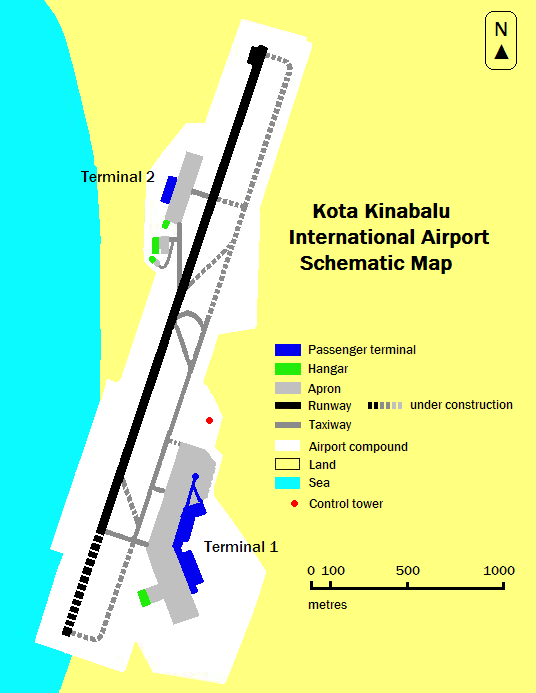
Schematic map of the airport

A major renovation and expansion of Terminal 1 was approved in mid-2005 by the Malaysian federal government, with the project costing RM1.4 billion. The runway was extended from 2,988 m (9,803 ft) to 3,780 m (12,402 ft), and the size of Terminal 1 was increased 34,000 m^{2} (370,000 sq ft) to 87,000 m^{2} (940,000 sq ft). The airport's air traffic control tower was relocated to a new standalone structure. The expanded Terminal 1 can accommodate four Boeing 747s, one Airbus A330, seven Boeing 737s, three Fokker 50s and three Dorniers at any given time. It has 12 jetways for passenger use.

The expansion allowed KKIA to handle the world's largest passenger aircraft, the Airbus A380. As a result, the airport's capacity increased to 12 million passengers annually—9 million for Terminal 1 and 3 million for Terminal 2.

Terminal 2, originally known as "Airport Lama," was the first terminal at Kota Kinabalu International Airport. After most operations moved to the new terminal in the 1980s, it remained inactive until 2006, when it was renovated to accommodate Low-cost carriers. The renovation was completed ahead of schedule, and the terminal reopened on 1 January 2007, in conjunction with Visit Malaysia Year 2007.

Due to congestion and limited space, all operations were eventually consolidated into Terminal 1, leading to Terminal 2's closure on 1 December 2015. The terminal is now used for cargo, charter flights, and general aviation.

=== Future developments ===
In July 2023, Malaysia Airports Sdn Bhd (MASB) announced a RM8.4 million allocation for a facelift program. The project includes refurbishing public toilets, resurfacing the runway, upgrading commercial lots and modernising the public address (PA) system to improve passenger comfort and operational efficiency.

In October 2023, Transport Minister Anthony Loke revealed long-term expansion plans aimed at increasing the airport's capacity from 9 million to 15.4 million passengers annually. As part of these efforts, the Transport Ministry is exploring the acquisition of adjacent land to facilitate the expansion under the 12th Malaysia Plan. The development is currently in the master planning phase, with consultations involving architecture and development firms. Currently developers and architecture companies are on the masterplanning phase for this project.

By the first quarter of 2024, Malaysia Airports unveiled a detailed three-year action plan for the airport's expansion, divided into two phases. Planned upgrades include extending the international terminal building by adding one additional gate, constructing new aircraft bays and developing a multi-level car park. Additionally, significant improvements to both landside and airside facilities will be implemented. These upgrades will boost Terminal 1's capacity from 10 million to 12 million passengers annually and enable the airport to accommodate up to 33 aircraft simultaneously.

On 13 November 2024, the Transport Ministry approved a RM442.3 million investment for the airport's expansion and modernisation. This funding will support infrastructure enhancements to ensure KKIA remains equipped to handle increasing passenger volumes and play a pivotal role in supporting Sabah's tourism and business sectors, as well as regional economic growth. Work commencement is set to begin in Q3 2025 with the final phase of the project to conclude in 2028.

== Proposed relocation to Kimanis ==
In June 2022, Berjaya Land and Sabah's Qhazanah Sabah Bhd signed a memorandum of understanding to explore relocating Kota Kinabalu International Airport (KKIA) to Kimanis, about 60 km from the city. By July 2023, Qhazanah Sabah's chairman reported positive feedback from a feasibility study presented to the Sabah Economic Planning Unit and Transport Ministry, though final approval awaited the State Cabinet's decision.

The proposal involved developing 6,070.5 hectares for the new airport, airport city and related infrastructure. However, it faced widespread criticism for its necessity, the proposed site's rural location, the inconvenience to passengers, and the lack of public transportation. Critics also argued the existing airport could be expanded and that relocation would economically disadvantage Kota Kinabalu.

By early 2024, Sabah's Chief Minister Hajiji Noor and Federal Minister of Transport Anthony Loke confirmed there were no plans to relocate, citing the current airport's sufficiency and the high costs of the new site.

== Terminals ==
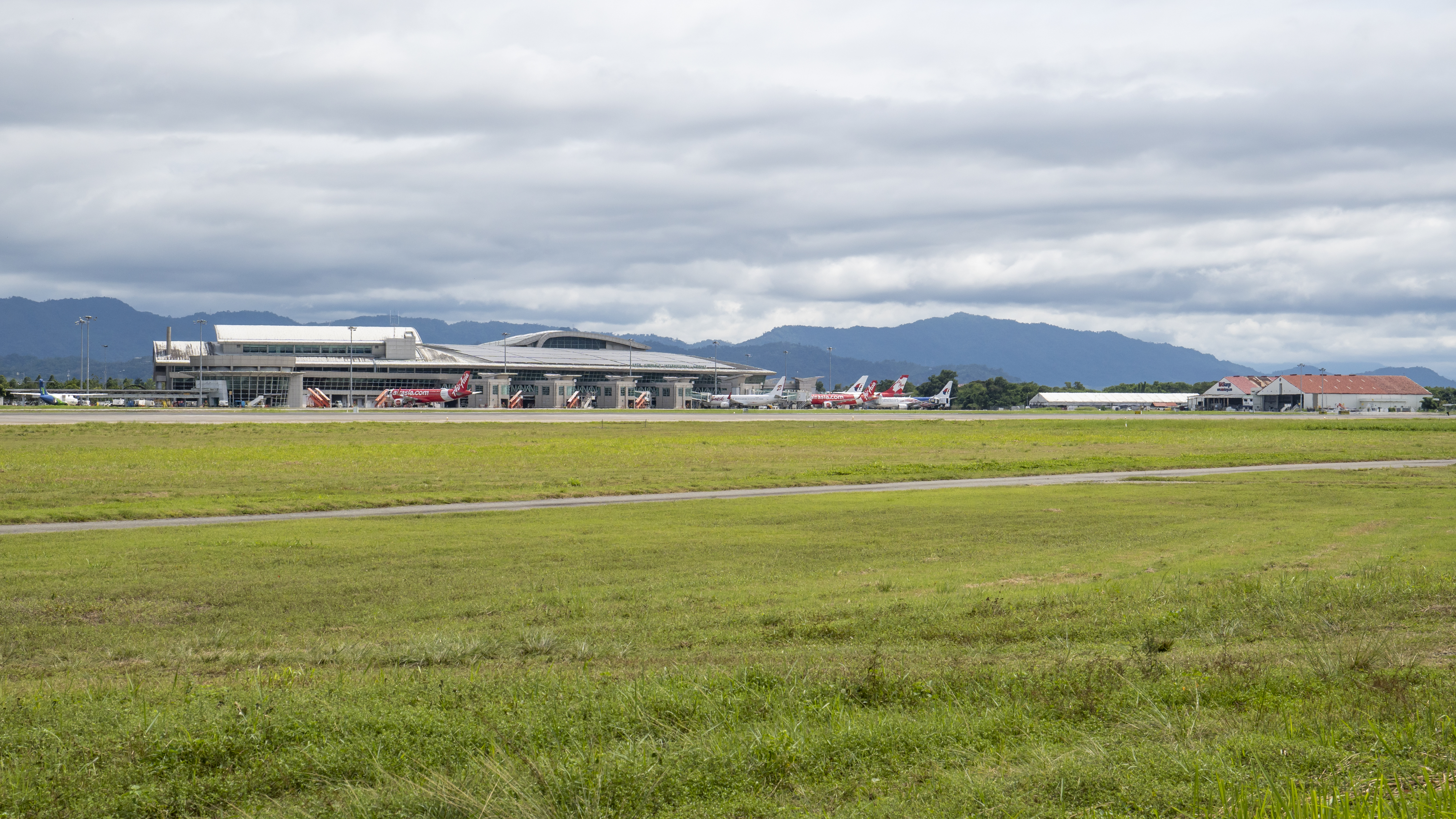
Overview of Kota Kinabalu International Airport Terminal 1

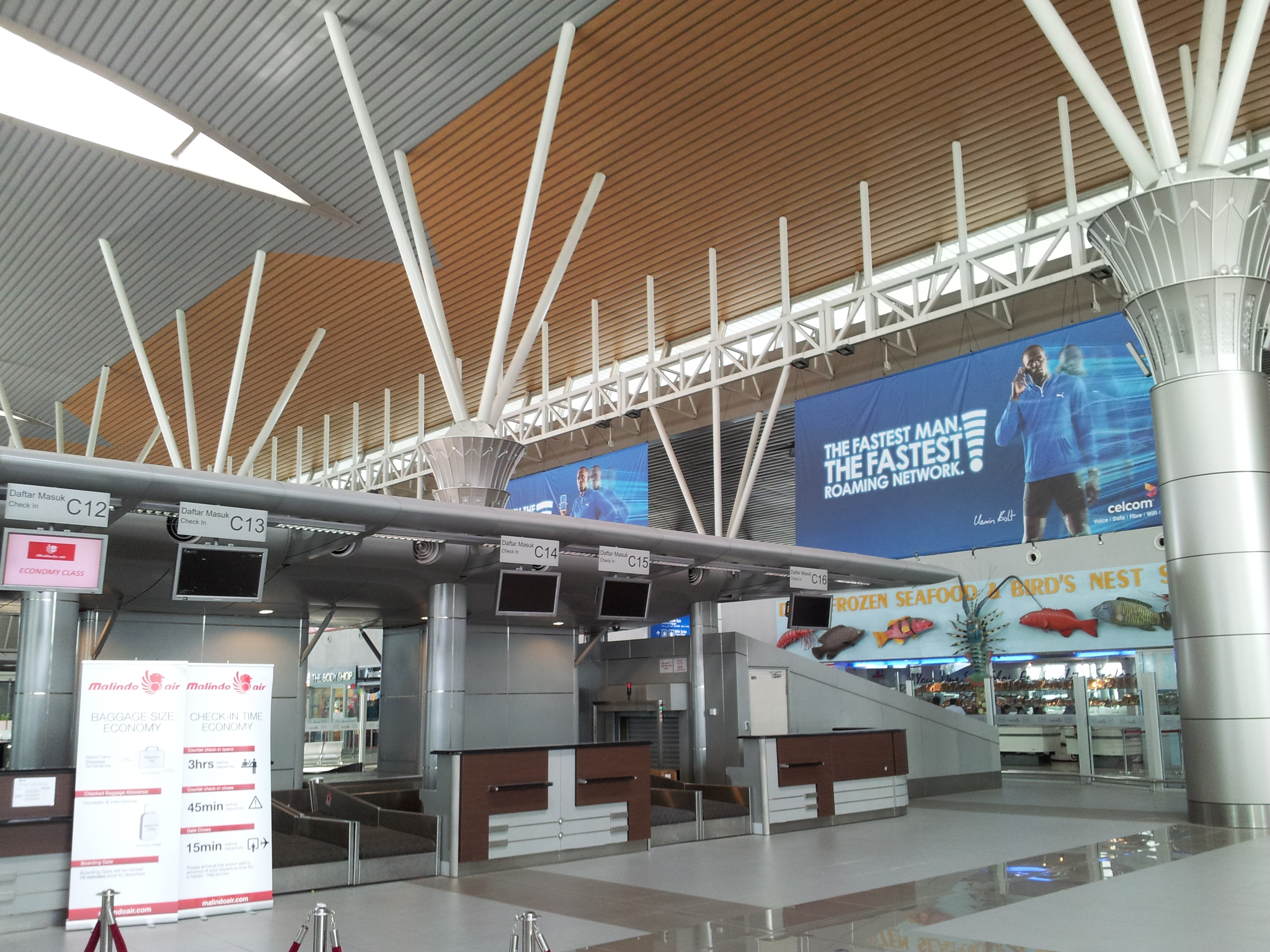
Check-in counters, Terminal 1

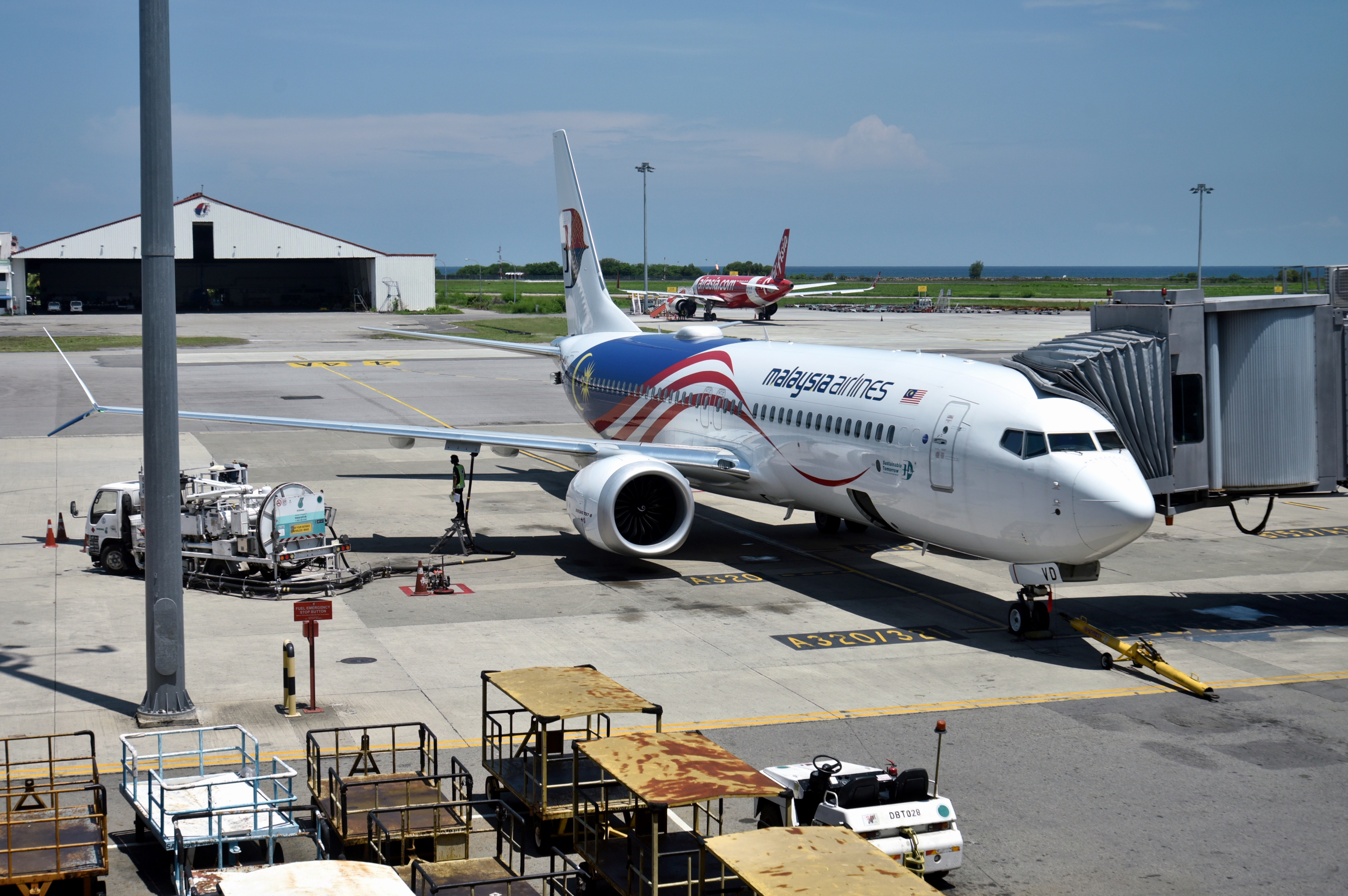
Narrow-body gate view of terminal 1 and hangar

=== Terminal 1 ===
Terminal 1 is the newer and the main terminal of KKIA. It can be accessed via Jalan Kepayan, Jalan Lintas and Jalan Putatan located in the suburb or township of Kepayan. The terminal is capable of handling 9 million passengers per annum and is equipped with the following facilities:

- 64 check-in counters for international and domestic flights
- Two baggage x-ray check-in machines and five hand luggage x-ray machines (three for departures, one for VIPs and one for staff)
- 36 immigration counters (16 for departures and 20 for arrivals)
- Six baggage carousels
- Five floors (first floor: arrival hall, second floor: airline offices and inter-state departures, third floor: check-in counters and domestic/foreign departures, fourth floor: Malaysia Airports office, fifth floor: Malaysia Airports administration office)
- 12 aerobridges (to provide jetway facilities for landing arrangements of either five widebody aircraft along with two narrowbody aircraft or 12 narrowbody aircraft)
- 22 aircraft parking bays capable of accommodating wide-body, narrow-body and turboprop aircraft
- 1,400 car parking bays

The Departure Hall column head design is inspired by the 'Wakid' basket design. A 'Wakid' is, in Sabahan tradition, a symbol of preparing for a meaningful journey. Some ethnic patterns of the Rungus and Bajau ethnic groups are also incorporated into the design of the floor tiles.

The first flight to depart at the new wing was MH2637 to Kuala Lumpur at 06:50 while the last flight at the old wing was at 00:25. Malaysia Airlines is the main operating airline in this terminal.

Generally, flights operating into and out of KKIA Terminal 1 are serviced by narrow-body aircraft. However, during peak travel periods, airlines such as Malaysia Airlines, AirAsia, Batik Air Malaysia and Jin Air will upgrade their equipment to wide-body aircraft such as the Airbus A330-300 and Boeing 777-200LR.

Additionally, KKIA was the first airport in Malaysia to welcome the Boeing 787 Dreamliner, operated by Royal Brunei during several product introductory flights in November 2013. As to date, the largest aircraft to have utilize the terminal are the B777-300ER and Airbus A350 XWB.

Prior to the COVID-19 pandemic, KKIA experienced issues during peak periods where aircraft parking is limited. A temporary workaround by Malaysian Airports was the introduction of a few new aircraft remote bays situated beside the MASkargo hangar. The remote bay allows either three additional narrowbody aircraft or one widebody and one narrowbody aircraft at any given time. Also introduced was the revision on current turboprop aircraft to narrowbody jet parking to allow more B737/A320 aircraft.

=== Terminal 2 ===
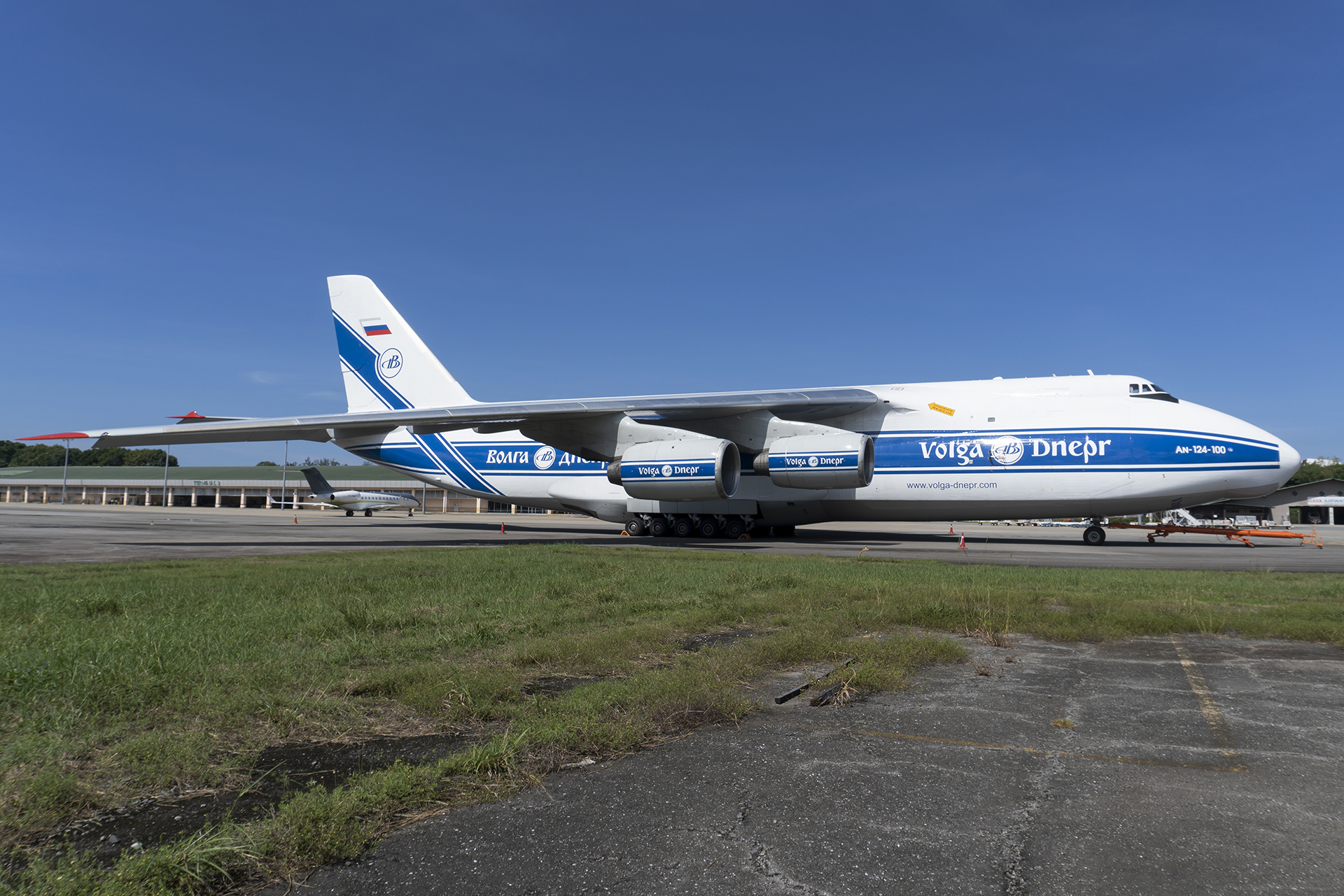
A Volga-Dnepr Antonov An-124 at Terminal 2

Terminal 2 was the original terminal building of the airport when it was first built. It is accessed via Jalan Mat Salleh in Tanjung Aru and is located on the other side of the runway from Terminal 1. Terminal 2 served charter and low-cost carriers, the main airline utilizing the terminal being AirAsia.

In 2006, Terminal 2 underwent a major renovation and extension to accommodate low-cost carriers, reopening on 1 January 2007 in conjunction with Visit Malaysia Year 2007. The works were completed 27 months ahead of schedule. It had 26 check-in counters for domestic and international flights and nine parking bays capable for narrow-body aircraft as well as seven luggage x-ray machines, a VIP room and 13 immigration counters. The terminal had the capacity to handle 3 million passengers annually.

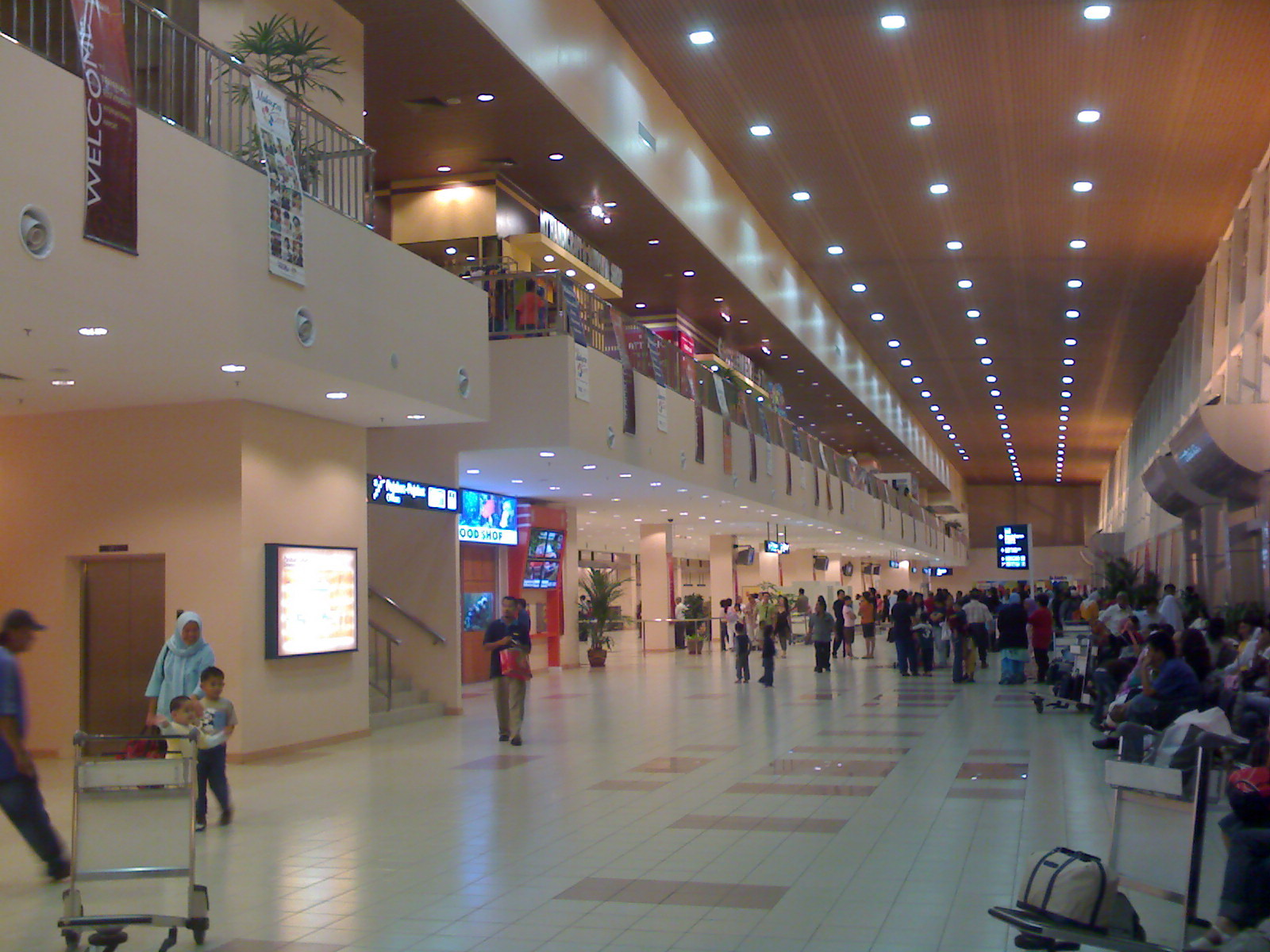
The lobby hall at Terminal 2 during its operation

However, with limited expansion space and the congestion at Terminal 2, as well as to consolidate all airlines operations in one terminal, airlines at Terminal 2 was ordered to move to Terminal 1. The decision was opposed by AirAsia, and the airline refused to move despite a government directive to do so, missing the deadline five times as of 1 August 2015. The issue was resolved when AirAsia agreed to move to Terminal 1 on 1 December 2015, and Terminal 2 was closed at midnight that day. The terminal will be converted for cargo, charter, VIP flights and general aviation use.

The Terminal currently serves for cargo operators such as Raya Airways and several General Aviation companies such as Weststar and Layang-Layang. Recently, during a state event with many VIPs in attendance, private jets on charter were moved to Terminal 2 to avoid congestion aircraft parking bays on Terminal 1. This includes a Boeing BBJ2 and Boeing 747-8 (BBJ).

== Airlines and destinations ==
=== Passenger ===
Airlines	Destinations
9 Air	Haikou; Charter: Guiyang
Air Busan	Busan
AirAsia	Beijing–Daxing, Bintulu, Fukuoka, Guangzhou, Hangzhou, Ho Chi Minh City, Hong Kong, Johor Bahru, Kota Bharu, Kuala Lumpur–International, Kuching, Miri, Penang, Sandakan, Seoul–Incheon, Shanghai–Pudong, Shenzhen, Sibu, Singapore, Taipei–Taoyuan, Tawau
AirBorneo	Labuan, Lahad Datu, Lawas, Limbang, Mulu
Asiana Airlines	Seasonal: Seoul–Incheon
Batik Air Malaysia	Kuala Lumpur–International, Kuala Lumpur–Subang, Singapore, Tawau; Seasonal: Zhangjiajie; Seasonal charter: Osaka–Kansai
China Southern Airlines	Guangzhou
Chongqing Airlines	Chongqing
Firefly	Kuala Lumpur–International
HK Express	Hong Kong
Indonesia AirAsia	Jakarta–Soekarno-Hatta
Jeju Air	Seoul–Incheon
Jin Air	Busan, Seoul–Incheon
Malaysia Airlines	Kuala Lumpur–International
Philippines AirAsia	Manila
Qingdao Airlines	Seasonal charter: Chengdu–Tianfu
Royal Brunei Airlines	Bandar Seri Begawan
Scoot	Singapore
Shanghai Airlines	Shanghai–Pudong
Spring Airlines	Shanghai–Pudong
XiamenAir	Fuzhou, Xiamen

=== Cargo ===
Airlines	Destinations
Kargo Xpress	Hong Kong, Kuala Lumpur–International, Shenzhen
MASkargo	Bandar Seri Begawan, Hong Kong, Kuala Lumpur–International, Kuching
Raya Airways	Kuala Lumpur–International, Nanjing
Teleport operated by AirAsia	Hong Kong, Kuala Lumpur–International
World Cargo Airlines	Kuala Lumpur–International, Kuching, Miri

== Traffic and statistics ==
=== Traffic ===
Annual passenger numbers and aircraft statistics
Year	Passengers handled	Passenger % change	Cargo (tonnes)	Cargo % change	Aircraft movements	Aircraft % change
1994	2,096,241	Steady	24,270	Steady	40,608	Steady
1995	2,554,181	▲21.8	29,537	▲21.7	43,882	▲8.0
1996	2,622,190	▲2.7	23,099	▼21.8	45,726	▲4.2
1997	2,732,146	▲4.2	37,203	▲61.1	49,148	▲7.5
1998	2,393,431	▼12.9	27,942	▼24.9	38,716	▼21.2
1999	2,752,207	▲15.0	27,087	▼3.1	40,634	▲5.0
2000	3,092,326	▲12.3	27,347	▲1.0	41,411	▲2.0
2001	3,036,196	▼1.8	24,887	▼9.0	40,157	▼3.0
2002	3,256,212	▲7.2	28,112	▲13.0	44,528	▲10.9
2003	3,302,366	▲1.4	25,638	▼8.8	44,748	▲0.5
2004	3,918,201	▲18.6	27,191	▲6.1	52,352	▲17.0
2005	3,975,136	▲1.4	25,473	▼6.3	51,824	▼1.0
2006	4,015,221	▲1.0	28,356	▲11.3	52,055	▲0.4
2007	4,399,939	▲9.6	35,638	▲25.7	52,047	▼0.01
2008	4,689,164	▲6.6	34,532	▼3.1	54,317	▲4.4
2009	4,868,526	▲3.8	25,079	▼27.4	53,554	▼1.4
2010	5,223,454	▲7.3	26,733	▲6.6	55,241	▲3.2
2011	5,808,639	▲11.2	28,534	▲6.7	59,638	▲8.0
2012	5,848,135	▲0.7	23,563	▼17.4	58,366	▼2.1
2013	6,929,692	▲18.5	21,922	▼7.0	67,601	▲15.8
2014	6,792,968	▼2.1	23,769	▲8.4	73,074	▲8.1
2015	6,573,461	▼3.2	24,768	▲4.2	71,209	▼2.6
2016	7,263,339	▲10.5	28,764	▲16.1	70,138	▼1.5
2017	8,006,446	▲10.2	27,372	▼4.8	73,237	▲4.4
2018	8,622,488	▲7.7	28,039	▲2.4	79,044	▲7.9
2019	9,445,494	▲9.5	28,664	▲2.2	83,580	▲5.7
2020	2,302,514	▼75.6	41,724	▲45.6	32,081	▼61.6
2021	1,123,673	▼51.2	63,104	▲51.2	23,634	▼26.3
^{Source: Malaysia Airports Holdings Berhad}

=== Statistics ===
Busiest flights out of Kota Kinabalu International Airport by frequency as of July 2024
Rank	Destination	Frequency (weekly)
1	Kuala Lumpur	168
2	Tawau	57
3	Sandakan	35
4	Kuching	29
5	Lahad Datu	28
6	Seoul	25
7	Labuan	21
8	Guangzhou	21
9	Penang	17
9	Johor Bahru	17
10	Hong Kong	15
11	Shanghai	14
12	Singapore	13
13	Miri	12
14	Bandar Seri Begawan	8
15	Beijing	7
15	Hangzhou	7
15	Mulu	7
15	Shenzhen	7
15	Sibu	7
15	Taipei	7
15	Wuhan	7
16	Bintulu	5
17	Busan	4
17	Manila	4
17	Jakarta	4
18	Fuzhou	3
18	Kota Bharu	3
18	Limbang	3

== Accidents and incidents ==
- 6 June 1976 – A chartered Sabah Air aircraft carrying several government ministers crashed in nearby Sembulan upon descending towards the airport, killing 11 passengers including the then-Chief Minister of Sabah Tun Fuad Stephens.
- 4 September 1991 – A chartered Grumman Gulfstream II aircraft crashed into a hill while on approach to the airport, killing all 12 people on board.

== See also ==
- KKIA@Kimanis
