= Sabah–Sarawak Gas Pipeline =

Natural gas pipeline in Malaysia

Location
- Country: Malaysia
- State: Sabah, Sarawak
- Direction: Western Coast
- Start: Kimanis, Sabah
- To: Bintulu, Sarawak

General information
- Type: Natural gas
- Operator: Petronas
- Construction started: 2011
- Expected: 2013
- Commissioned: 2014
- Decommissioned: before 2027 (Lawas–Limbang–Miri–Bintulu pipeline)

Technical information
- Length: 500 km (310 mi)

Sabah–Sarawak Gas Pipeline (SSGP) is a 500 kilometre Malaysian natural gas pipeline that linked Kimanis in Sabah to Bintulu in Sarawak. The pipeline is part of the Petronas development project of "Sabah–Sarawak Integrated Oil and Gas Project", and has start operating since early 2014. Due to the unstable geographic location of the pipeline with frequent soil movement and subsidence that is causing frequent gas leaks, the pipeline between Lawas to Bintulu is in the process of being fully decommissioned from 2025 until 2027.

== History ==
The pipeline was constructed in 2011 with a total of RM4.6 billion (US$1 billion) been allocated to complete the project.

=== Gas leak incidents (2014–2022) ===
There have been four reported gas leaks along the line, two resulting explosions. On 11 June 2014, the pipeline located in between Lawas and Long Sukang in Sarawak exploded that caused the temporary shutdown of the line. No casualties were reported in the incident. On 10 January 2018, the line along Long Luping of Lawas District in Limbang Division was leaked although no impact to surrounding communities and environment are being reported. In the early morning of 13 January 2020, there was another explosion which resulted in a fire in the vicinity of the Penan village of Long Selulong, Ulu Baram, Sarawak. On 21 September 2022, a pipeline leak in the vicinity of KP201 due to soil movement which resulted to a safety shutdown on the gas supply. On 17 November 2022, a pipeline located in Long Ugui, Lawas, exploded. One casualty and two injuries were reported in the incident.

=== Lawas to Bintulu pipeline decommissioning process (2025–2027) ===
On 28 January 2025, Petronas announced the decommissioning of the pipeline of Lawas, Limbang, Miri, and Bintulu that will be done in stages and set to be completed before 2027 due to the unstable geographic location of the pipeline location with frequent soil movement and subsidence that frequently causes gas leaks. The decommissioning plans include the plugging and abandonment of approximately 153 wells and the abandonment of about 37 offshore facilities and one onshore facility, which is the pipeline.

== See also ==
- List of natural gas pipelines
