= Kimanis =

- Town
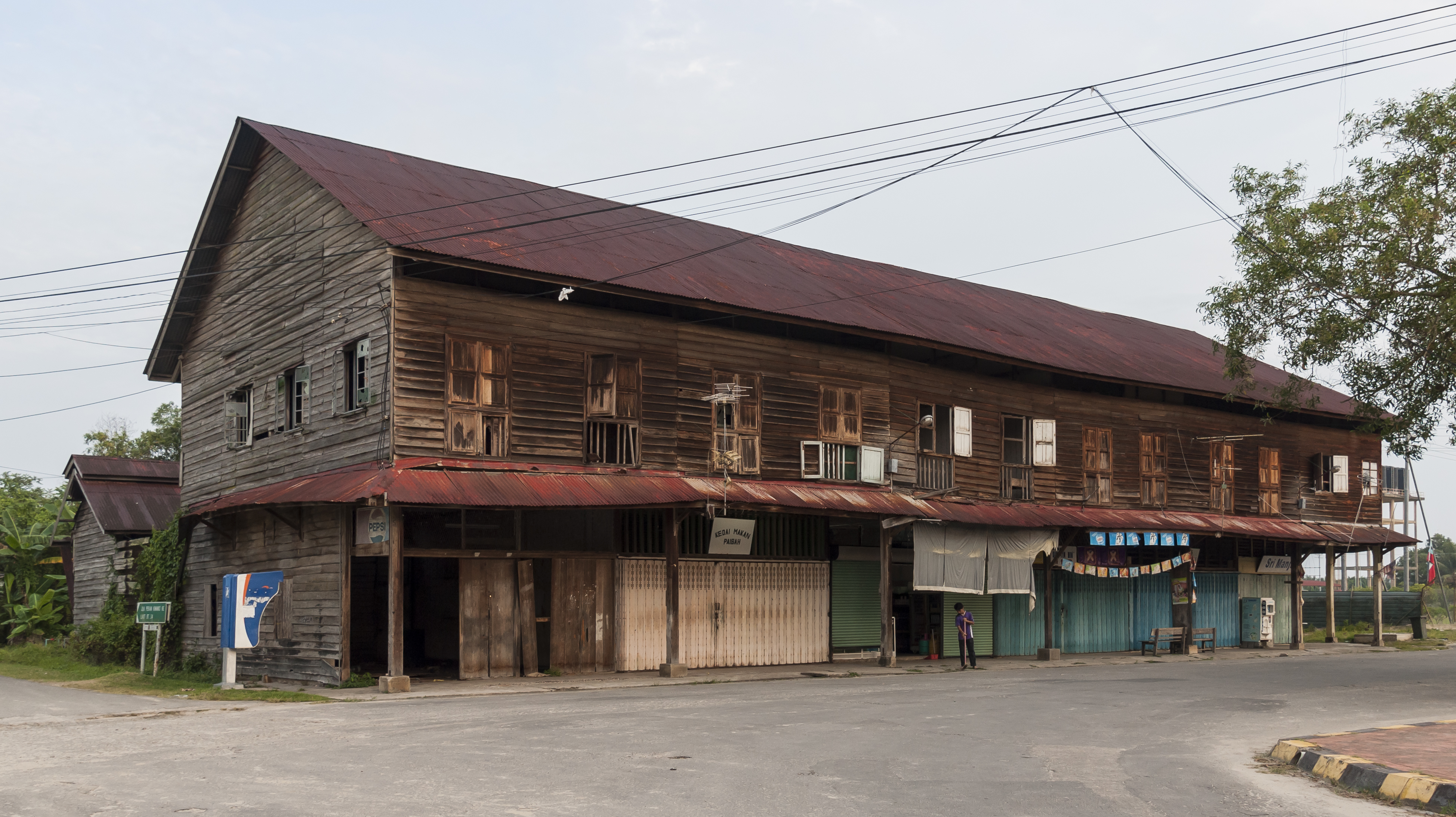
- Colonial-era shoplots in Kimanis town

- Location of Kimanis Town in Papar District

- Location within Borneo
- Coordinates: 5°37′N 115°53′E
- Country: Malaysia
- State: Sabah
- Division: West Coast
- District: Papar
- Administration: Papar District Council

Government
  - Body: Papar District Council
- Time zone: UTC+8 (MST)
- Neighbourhood Area: Bongawan, Papar, Benoni

Kimanis (Chinese: 金馬利) is a Malaysian town and a parliamentary constituency of Papar District on the west coast of Sabah. It is located approximately 45 kilometres south of the city of Kota Kinabalu, halfway between Papar and Beaufort.

== History ==
Kimanis was part of the Brunei Sultanate until the 1800s. During the Brunei Civil War from 1660 to 1673, the Sultan of Brunei at that time, Sultan Muhyiddin offered Kimanis to the Sultan of Sulu for his assistance in ending the war, but Sulu had dishonored the agreement made and Sultan Muhyiddin retracted all promises made to the Sulu Sultanate. The Sulu Sultanate then issued a false claim that the Sultan of Brunei ceded the entire Sabah to Sulu.

During the reign of Sultan Abdul Momin, Kimanis was leased as the base for the American Trading Company of Borneo owned by Joseph William Torrey, Thomas Bradley Harris and Chinese investors, which obtained a lease over part of the northern Borneo area from the Sultanate of Brunei in the late 19th century. The area was then taken over by the British under the administration of North Borneo. The British built a railway track, the Kimanis railway station which became one of the stops on the present-day Sabah State Railway.

In 2006, there was a proposal to relocate the current Kota Kinabalu International Airport to Kimanis. However, the government decided it was economically more feasible to renovate and extend the present airport. The national oil and gas company, Petronas constructed a terminal there known as Sabah Oil and Gas Terminal (SOGT) which was completed in 2014, mainly to process and transport oil and gas from the West Coast Field in South China Sea; the terminal is also connected with another oil and gas terminal in Sarawak through the Sabah–Sarawak Gas Pipeline (SSGP).

In November 2024, it was reported that a new solar glass manufacturing plant would be constructed that would further boost the economy growth in the town and create new jobs in the community.

== Local government ==
Kimanis is within the municipal area of the Papar District Council (Majlis Daerah Papar).

== See also ==
- KKIA@Kimanis
