= Telipok =

Other transcription(s)
  - Simplified Chinese: 打里卜
  - Traditional Chinese: 打裡卜
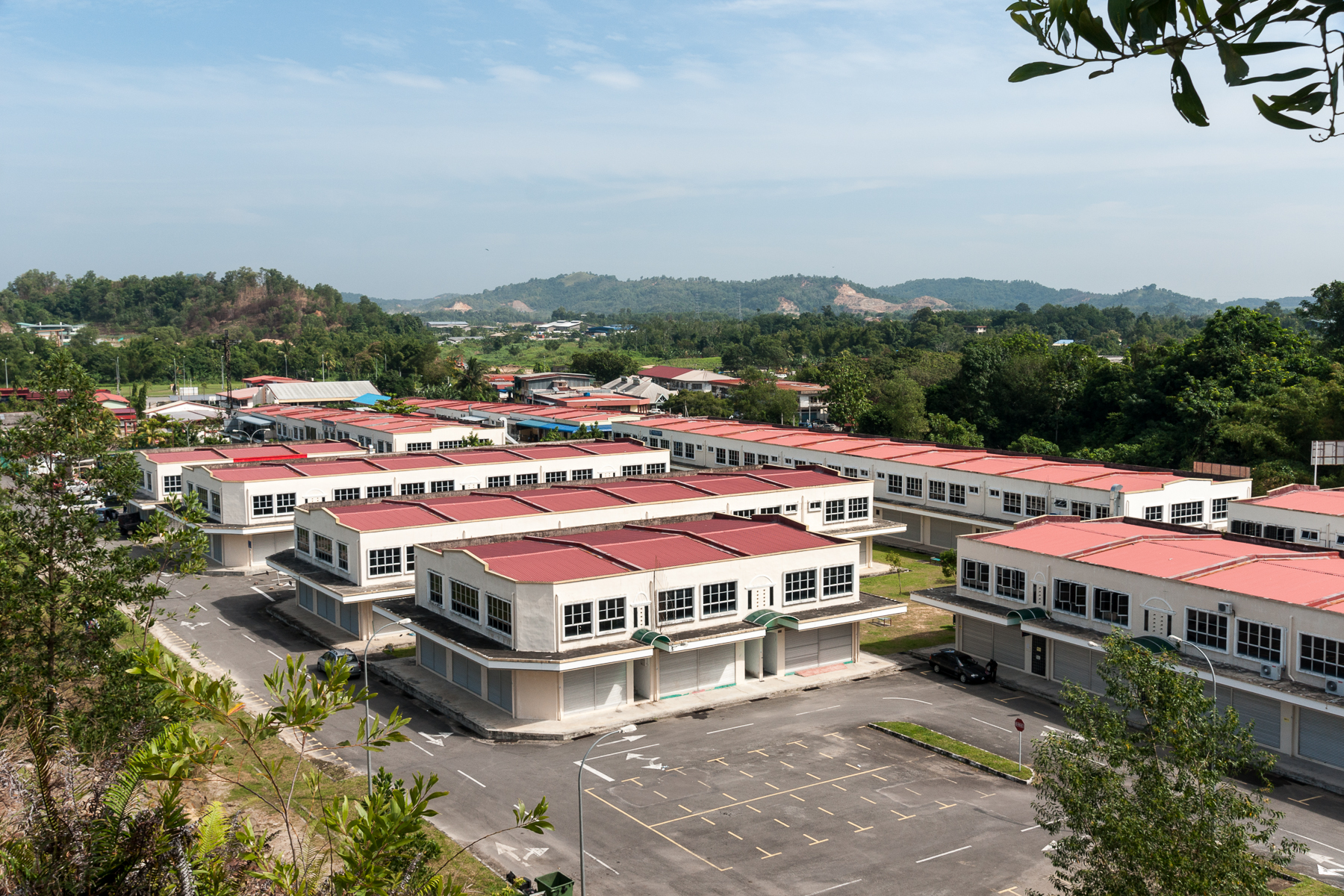
- Shoplots in Telipok town

- Location within Borneo
- Coordinates: 6°05′0″N 116°12′0″E
- Country: Malaysia
- State: Sabah
- Division: West Coast
- District: Kota Kinabalu
- Administration: Kota Kinabalu City Hall

Government
  - Body: Kota Kinabalu City Hall
- Elevation: 168 m (551 ft)

Population (2010)
  - Total: 432
- Time zone: UTC+8 (MST)
- Area code: 088

Telipok is a town located approximately 15 kilometres north of Kota Kinabalu, the state capital of Sabah, Malaysia. The town is within the administration of Kota Kinabalu City Hall and is a sub-district of the city. It is also part of the urban expanse of Kota Kinabalu, and of its metropolitan area. It is situated near Kota Kinabalu Industrial Park, and is within 5 kilometres of the towns of Manggatal, Sepanggar, and Tuaran.

== History ==
During World War II, Telipok served as a military base where the Kinabalu Guerillas led by Albert Kwok actively operating to fight the Japanese.

== Refugees slum ==
Telipok is notoriously known for its slums where Filipino refugees reside, where frequent crimes such as robbery and cable theft happen. Due to rampant criminal activity, there have been many proposals to repatriate all refugees back to their country of origin or to move them to an island on the border.

== Infrastructure ==
Telipok act as a major transit stop settlement for the Pan Borneo Highway of Federal Route 1 in Sabah, also have industrial infrastructure. Telipok also have secondary route (Jalan Norowot) which connects to Sulaman and Sepanggar, and interior route (Jalan Bongaliou Longkou Lama Timpok) which connects to both Kiulu and Ranau, located behind the town of Telipok near the Crocker Range.
