= Kepayan =

Neighbourhood in Kota Kinabalu, Sabah, Malaysia

Coordinates: 5°55′26.4″N 116°03′55.7″E

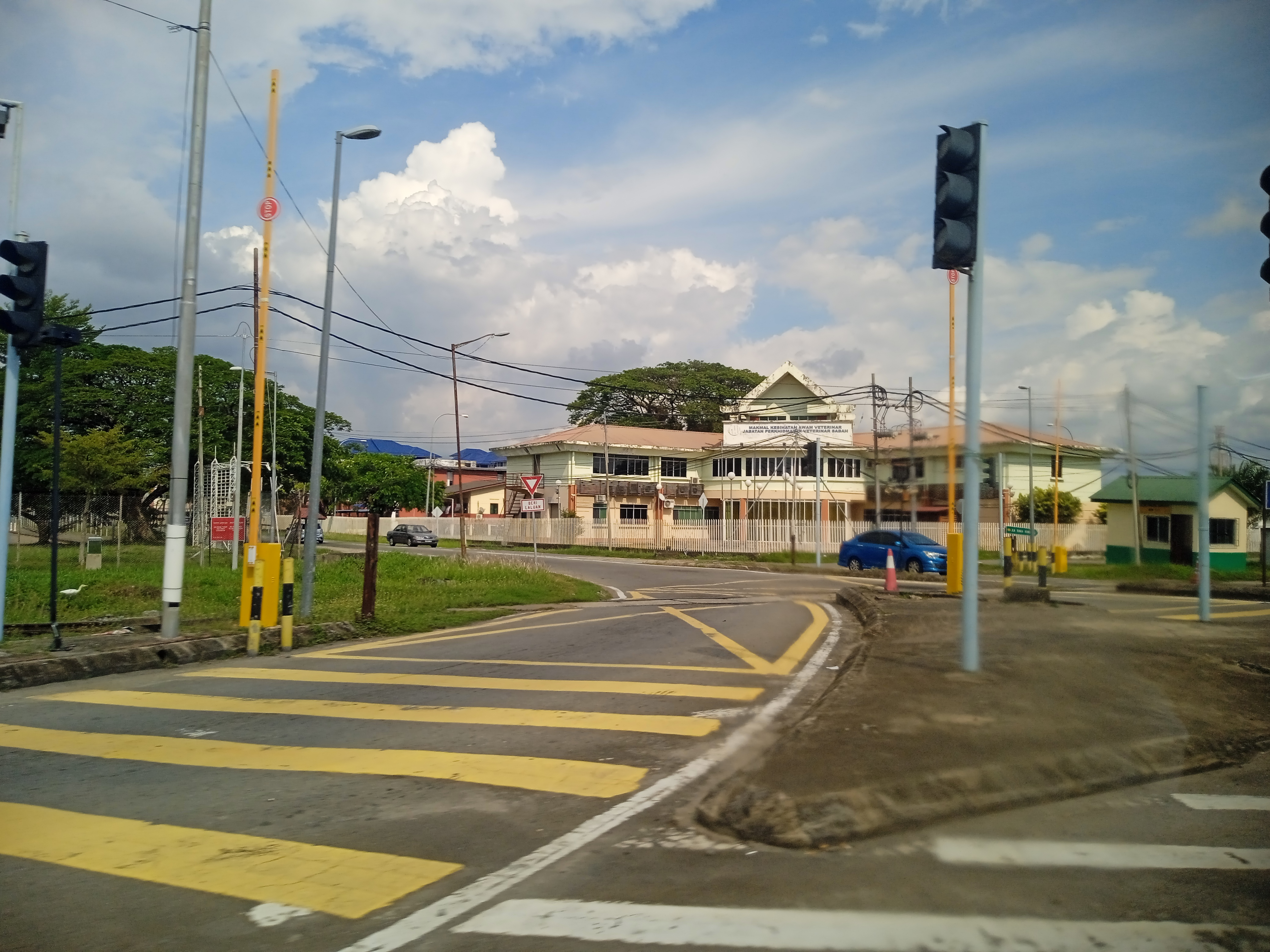
Jalan Pahlawan in Kepayan

Kepayan is a sub-district, or a neighbourhood, within the city of Kota Kinabalu in Sabah, Malaysia. It is located within Kota Kinabalu city district, and borders with the district of Penampang (which certain parts of this neighbourhood are jurisdictionally located under the Penampang Municipal Council since most of it is administered by the Kota Kinabalu City Hall). The Kota Kinabalu International Airport, Sabah Contingent Police Headquarters as well as the Kota Kinabalu Central Prison, are all located in Kepayan.
