= Manggatal =

Menggatal/Manggatal

Other transcription(s)
  - Simplified Chinese: 孟加达
  - Traditional Chinese: 孟加達
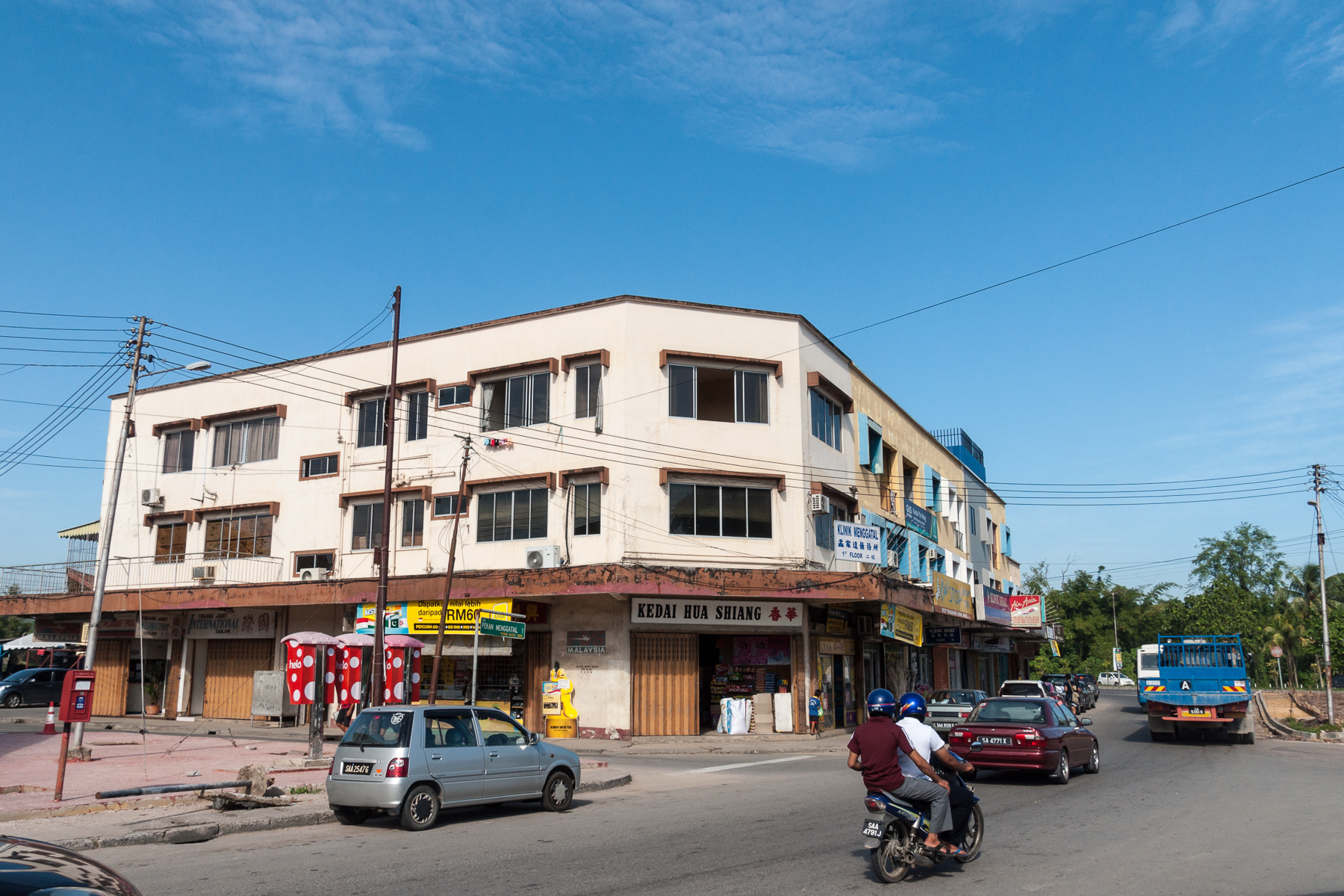
- Manggatal town

- Location within Borneo
- Coordinates: 6°01′N 116°09′E
- Country: Malaysia
- State: Sabah
- District: Kota Kinabalu
- Division: West Coast
- Elevation: 15 m (49 ft)
- Highest elevation: 900 m (3,000 ft)

Menggatal or Manggatal is a Malaysian town, sub-district and suburb of Kota Kinabalu District on the west coast of Sabah. It is a suburb of the state capital, Kota Kinabalu, and is under the jurisdiction of Kota Kinabalu City Hall. It is located along Jalan Tuaran Lama, which is the main road leading north from Kota Kinabalu city centre to neighbouring Tuaran District.

The town is notable for being one of few towns in Sabah where wooden pre-World War II era shophouses still stand. The sub-district area's land prices are constantly rising up as most of the land area in the coastal Kota Kinabalu have already been occupied. Many developers have key interests in this sub-district area as the population of the capital district is steadily increasing.

== Etymology ==
The name "Manggatal" or "Menggatal" does not derive from hypothetical Malay word meaning "going itchy", but instead from the English language during the British North Borneo Company era. Those two words of the English language are "mango" and "town" in which the latter had since evolved into just "tal" due to the fast spoken linguistic nature of the native Dusuns residing in the sub-Jesselton area. This area of present-day Kota Kinabalu was referred to as "Mango Town" by the British colonials due to the infamous abundance of mangoes grown by the native Dusuns and Hakka Chinese community. Since then, interactions between the native Dusuns, Bajaus and Hakka Chinese have turned the name of town into just 'Manggatal'.

== History ==
During the World War II, Manggatal is also the base where the Kinabalu Guerillas led by a Sarawak-born Chinese, Albert Kwok actively operating to fight the Japanese. During the late 1990s, many native Dusuns were made instant millionaires when their Native Title (NT) lands were claimed by the government to be made into highways; the Tuaran Bypass Highway and the old Jalan Tuaran Lama Highway that links Manggatal and Inanam to Tuaran district. In the present day, many landowners in Manggatal, which are mainly native Dusuns, have also been forced to relocate from their ancestral lands due to the Pan Borneo Highway. They are reimbursed in the form of cash funded by the Federal Government.

== Demography ==
Manggatal was originally populated sparsely by native Dusuns of the Bundu tribe or Central Dusunic stock who are ethnolinguistically interrelated to their kinsfolk in the highland/riverine lowland districts of Kota Marudu, Tambunan, Keningau, Telupid, Beluran, Kota Belud and also Ranau as well as the Bajaus. In the late 19th and early 20th centuries, this native population was supplemented by Chinese migrants, most of whom were Hakkas. The Chinese community of Manggatal, which is still dominated by Hakkas, plays an important role in the town's economy as its members own most of the shops in the town.

Starting in the 1970s, Manggatal has witnessed a drastic increase in the population of Filipino and Indonesian immigrants, many of whom have been naturalised (both legally and illegally) and live in squatter colonies.

== Education ==
The state's main institution of learning, Universiti Malaysia Sabah, is located in a coastal part of Manggatal sub-district, in the nearby Sepanggar neighbourhood. Among other educational institutions are Institut Sinaran, Kota Kinabalu Sixth Form College, SMK Tebobon, Kota Kinabalu Indonesian School, SMK Bandaraya (once an elite school formerly known as SMK Manggatal), SK Rampayan, SK Darau, SK Unggun, SK Kokol, SK Malawa, SK Pengkalan TLDM Teluk Sepanggar, SK Tebobon, SJK(C) Lok Yuk Manggatal and also SJK(C) Good Shepherd.

== Place of interest ==
=== Kokol Hill ===
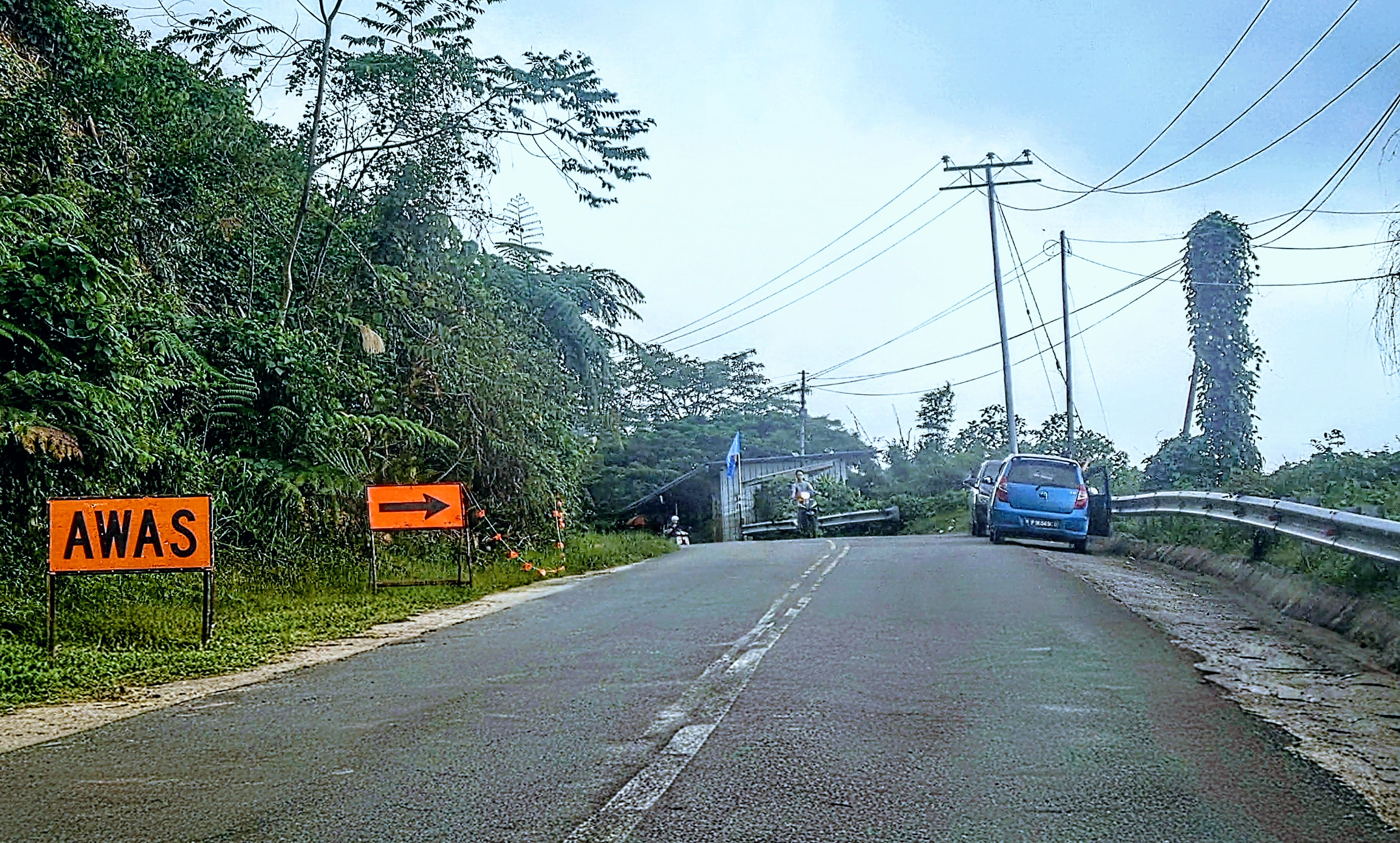
Jalan Kokol Poring-Poring.

Kokol Hill is a scenic highland retreat. Located around 800m to 900 m (3,000 ft) above sea level, it was part of the Crocker Range within the Kota Kinabalu District. It is popular for its cafe, hotel, farmstay, homestay and resort located on top of the highlands. Kokol Hill is accessible by roads via Jalan Kokol Poring-Poring from the main town of Menggatal. It is also accessible by roads from Kiansom, Inanam, though it is much steeper (up to 18%) than the one from Menggatal and is generally unpaved. The Mount Kinabalu can also be seeing from certain location.

=== Bongkud Waterfall ===
A hidden gem which offering a rewarding jungle trek through lush greenery. It was also located within the Crocker Range, and it was quite close to Kokol Hill. Nearby roads can also leads to Telipok, Kiulu and Tamparuli, though it is generally unpaved.
