= Kota Kinabalu City Hall =

City Council of Kota Kinabalu in Sabah, Malaya

Kota Kinabalu City Hall Dewan Bandaraya Kota Kinabalu
- Emblem

Type
- Type: City council of Kota Kinabalu

History
- Founded: 2 February 2000
- Preceded by: Kota Kinabalu Municipal Council

Leadership
- Mayor: Dr. Sabin Samitah
- Director-General: Sr. Lifred Wong

Meeting place
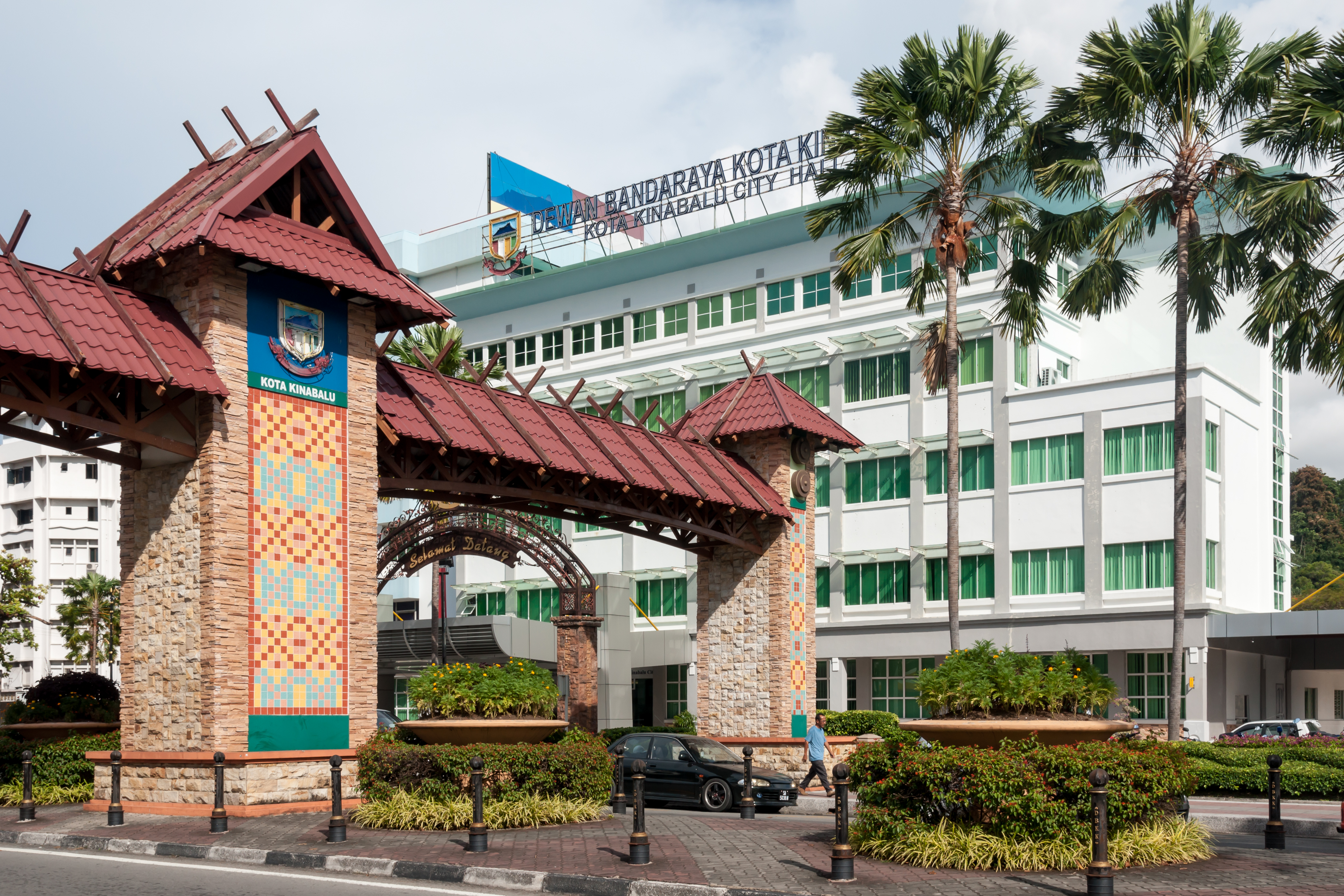
- Kota Kinabalu, Sabah

Website
- www.dbkk.sabah.gov.my

The Kota Kinabalu City Hall (Malay: Dewan Bandaraya Kota Kinabalu, abbreviated DBKK) is the city council which administers the city and district of Kota Kinabalu in the state of Sabah, Malaysia. The council consists of the mayor plus twenty-four councillors appointed to serve a one-year term by the Sabah State Government.

== History ==
The history of the town of Jesselton can be traced to the administration of British North Borneo Company (BNBC) in 1881. Throughout the administration under the Federation of Malaysia since 1963, the town was subsequently renamed Kota Kinabalu and a council was later established after it was granted city status on 2 February 2000. Kota Kinabalu was formerly administrated by Majlis Perbandaran Kota Kinabalu (MPKK) or the Kota Kinabalu Municipal Council. Their jurisdiction covers an area of 351 square kilometres encompassing the sub-districts, suburbs and/or towns such as Tanjung Aru, Kepayan, Kota Kinabalu city, Luyang (including Damai and Foh Sang neighbourhoods), Inanam, Menggatal, Telipok, Likas, Alamesra and Sepanggar.

=== Appointed mayors of Kota Kinabalu ===
Since 2000, the city has been led by seven mayors. The previous mayors are listed as below:

No	Mayor	Term start	Term end
1	Abdul Ghani Abdul Rashid	2 February 2000	1 February 2005
2	Iliyas Ibrahim	2 February 2005	1 February 2011
3	Abidin Madingkir	2 February 2011	1 February 2016
4	Yeo Boon Hai @ Arling bin Ukau	2 February 2016	31 December 2018
5	Nordin Siman	1 January 2019	31 December 2020
6	Noorliza Awang Alip	1 January 2021	31 December 2023
7	Dr. Sabin Samitah	1 January 2024	Incumbent

Mayor of Kota Kinabalu
- Incumbent; Datuk Dr. Hj. Sabin Samitah since 1 January 2024
- Seat: Kota Kinabalu
- Term length: One year term only, renewable at Chief Minister's pleasure
- Constituting instrument: Sabah State Government
- Inaugural holder: Abdul Ghani Abdul Rashid
- Formation: 2 February 2000
- Deputy: Director-General of Kota Kinabalu City Hall
- Website: www.dbkk.sabah.gov.my

== Mascot ==
The official mascots of Kota Kinabalu are:

- Ardeidae/Egretta alba
- Orchidaceae/Phalaenopsis amabilis
- Casuarinaceae
