= Gaya Island =

Island of Sabah, Malaysia

Native name: Pulau Gaya/Gayo/Goyoh
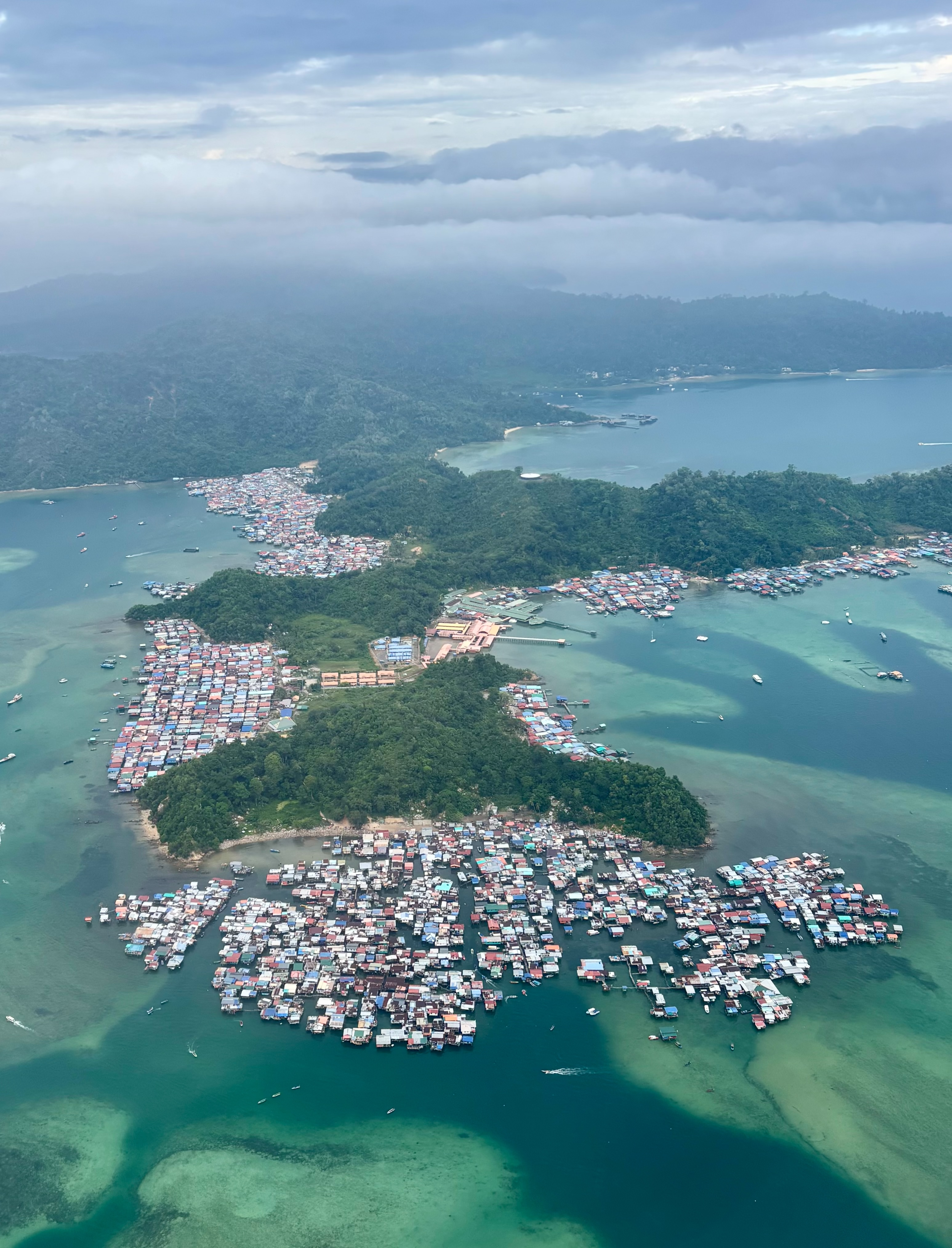
- Aerial view of Gaya Island, taken in 2026
- Interactive map of Gaya Island

Geography
- Location: Tunku Abdul Rahman Park
- Coordinates: 6°1′5″N 116°2′7″E
- Archipelago: Borneo (Greater Sunda Islands)
- Adjacent to: South China Sea
- Highest elevation: 300 m (1000 ft)
- Highest point: Gaya Island High Point (300 metres (980 ft))

Administration
- Malaysia
- State: Sabah
- Division: West Coast
- District: Kota Kinabalu

Demographics
- Population: est. 20,000–30,000 (Note: Out of an estimated total population of nearly 20,000–30,000, only about 1,000 of the residents of Gaya Island are from the families of the original Gaya inhabitants, the local Bajaus (West Coast Bajaus and Ubian), while the rest are illegal immigrants from the southern part of the Philippines who arrived in the 1970s, encouraged by the United Sabah National Organisation (USNO)-led Sabah government to seek refuge from war in the southern Philippines, which subsequently led to an influx of migrants, which changed the island's demographics significantly to this day.) (2024)

Gaya Island (Malay: Pulau Gaya; Kadazan Dusun: Gayo; West Coast Bajau: Goyoh) is a sizeable island located in the West Coast Division of Kota Kinabalu District, Sabah in the South China Sea in Malaysia. With a size of 1,483 hectares (3,665 acres), the island forms part of the Tunku Abdul Rahman Park (TARP) with an elevation of up to 300 metres (980 ft). Several ridges rise more than 180 metres (590 ft), peaking at 300 metres (980 ft), along the backbone of the island.

Historically, Gaya Island was the settlement harbour of the British North Borneo Chartered Company (NBCC). Faced with various problems with the lack of streams and rivers, infertile soils, and the island position sheltered from winds, Gaya did not flourish as expected and was further razed to the ground by local resistance leader Mat Salleh during a rebellion on 9 July 1897 and never thereafter rebuilt. It has been gazetted as a forest reserve since 1923, during the administration of British North Borneo. In 1974, the TARP became Sabah's second national park gazetted after the Kinabalu Park. Gaya is the largest island gazetted within the TARP, is closest to the state capital and is covered with dense virgin tropical forest.

The island has 20 kilometres (12 mi) of hiking trails and three five-star resorts named Gayana Marine Resort, home to the Marine Ecology Research Centre; the neighbouring Gaya Island Resort (by YTL Hotel Group); and the Bunga Raya Island Resort on the northeast part of the island. The island is known as a paradise for snorkellers, and divers while also offering paddleboarding, zip lining and guided treks on its lush forests. In the 2010s, there has been a plan to turn Gaya Island into a city island and tourism hub. A cable car line has also been proposed before to connect with the city centre. In 2024, the island has an estimated population of 30,000, with only 1,000 belonging to the original island inhabitants, while the rest were illegal immigrants arriving in the 1970s.

== Etymology ==
Gaya Island derived its name from the word "gayo", which means "big" in the Kadazan-Dusun, as well as "goyoh" in the Bajau languages. According to J. H. Macartney, a former local British Secretary for the Local Government in North Borneo, the name "gaya" comes from the local Bajau word "goyoh", which is translated as "big" in English. Therefore, Gaya Island literally translates as "Big Island" by the British. The island soil is described as bright red clay.

== History ==
A 1907 British Admiralty Chart, featuring the island of Gaya on western coast of North Borneo mainland

As with most islands in northern Borneo, Gaya Island was once under the thalassocracy of the Sultanate of Brunei. In 1765, British navigator Thomas Forrest, serving under the East India Company (EIC), made a survey on the island. On 29 December 1877, Sultan Abdul Momin of Brunei made a cession and conferred the title of "Maharaja of Gaya and Sandakan" to German adventurer, businessman and diplomat Baron von Overbeck, and the following year, on 22 January 1878, Sultan Jamal ul-Azam of Sulu also made a cession and conferred the title of "Dato Bendahara and Raja of Sandakan" to him. This resulted in Overbeck having the authority over the area in northern Borneo, from Kimanis to Sibuku Bay, as well as islands such as Gaya Island, Ambong Island and Marudu. When Overbeck left, all rights were passed into British colonial merchant and entrepreneur Alfred Dent, who later formed the North Borneo Chartered Company (NBCC).

=== British acquisition ===
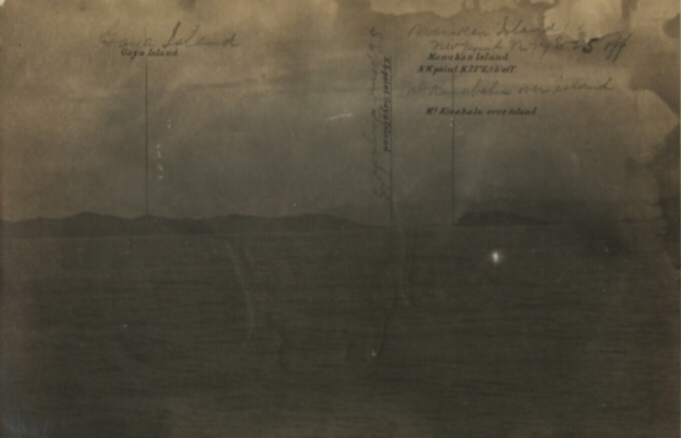
Gaya (on the left) with the Manukan and Mount Kinabalu view, British North Borneo, c. 1900s

The foundation of Gaya Island as an early trading settlement is associated with the foundation of the town of Jesselton. Before the Europeans' arrival, the island was inhabited by the local Bajau people. In 1882, the NBCC set up an early British trading settlement on the island with the focus on the development of infrastructure for it to become the central administration of North Borneo as well as the collection site for raw materials gathered from the western coast. Therefore, NBCC provided various infrastructure facilities such as administrative buildings, jetty warehouses, rows of shops and housing areas based on non-permanent materials such as nibong (oncosperma tigillarium) and rumbia (metroxylon sagu) roofs. Based on the book of "Exploration of Mount Kina Balu, North Borneo" by English explorer and naturalist John Whitehead in 1893, he summarised the condition of the island infrastructure as follows:

Gaya Island on 9 April 1885 had several Chinese shops built in a row facing the sea on a flat area of several acres, but the resident of Gaya Island at that time felt that the 'Town Lot' on the island would not achieve progress because a year later when the island was revisited, it was found that the shops, houses and administrative buildings were in a dilapidated condition and no longer suitable for use since the structure were only made based on ordinary materials found on the island.

The NBCC settlement on the island did not last longer than expected as a result of various problems such as extremely hot temperatures, shallow waters, difficulty in obtaining clean water resources and destruction caused by Mat Salleh's rebellion in 1897. This situation caused the British to start looking for a new settlement area to replace the island's role as the administrative centre and port for the western coast of North Borneo. As a result, Gantian was deemed a suitable location but due to its mangrove swamps that made it difficult to build a railway system and difficult shipping routes with declining trade, mainland Jesselton was founded in 1899 as the most suitable replacement of Gaya Island, named in honour of Charles Jessel, a manager of the NBCC.

=== Post-war and present history ===
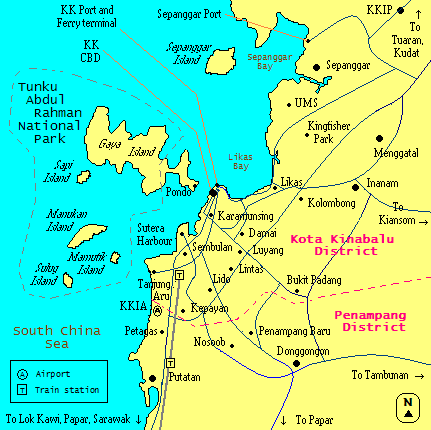
Location of Gaya Island within the Tunku Abdul Rahman Park (TARP)

Throughout World War II, the island was spared from destruction, and until the formation of the Malaysian federation, the island administration was passed down by the British to Sabah and subsequently under Malaysian sovereignty. In 1974, the major part of Gaya and Sapi islands was gazetted as TARP, covering an area of 8,990 acres (36.4 km^{2}). In 1979, the park was increased to 12,185 acres (49.31 km^{2}) with the inclusion of the three nearby islands of Manukan, Mamutik and Sulug. The park is spread over 4,929 hectares (49.29 km^{2}), two-thirds of which cover the sea. In present days, the park is managed by Sabah Parks, with many of its areas classified under protected areas; this includes sites for educational nature trails, nature and wildlife conservation and proboscis monkey preservation through the Gaya Island Resort Wildlife Centre. The Gaya Island Resort Marine Centre, meanwhile, advocates for coral reef restoration, turtle rescue, and conservation through education. Starting from the 2010s, there have been proposals to develop the island as the city tourism hub with the construction of facilities such as cable cars, a police base and the resettlement of the refugee inhabitants.

==== 1970s illegal settlement ====
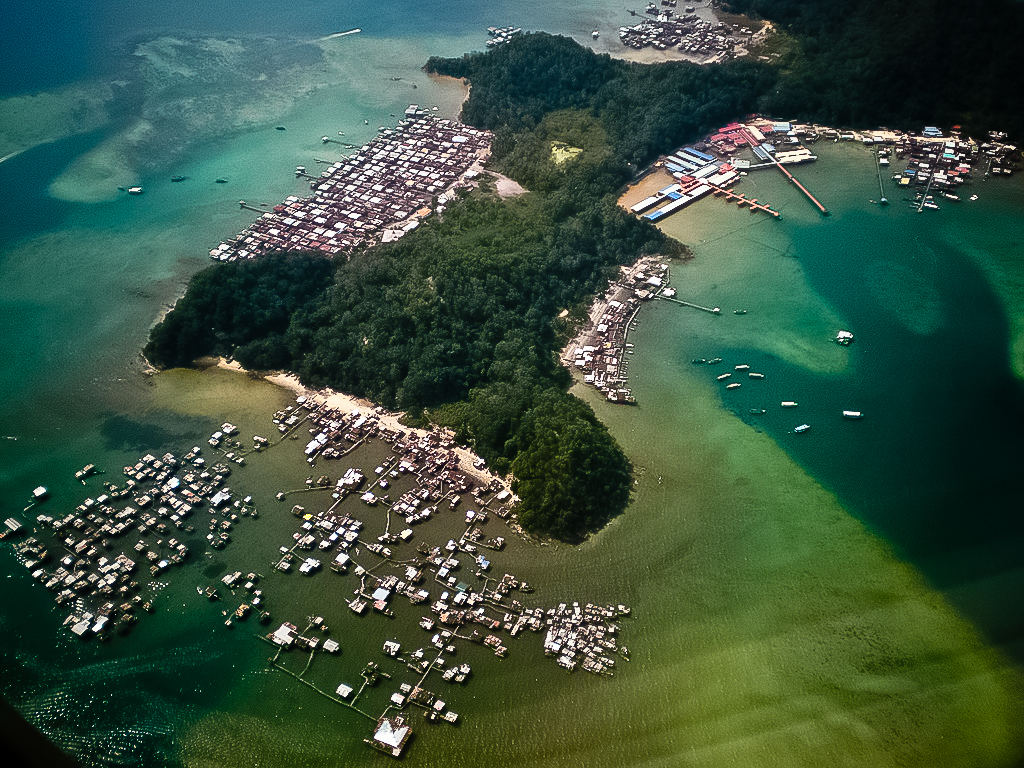
Pondo Village, with a huge colony of illegal immigrants housed in Gaya Island, pictured in 2007

Starting in the 1970s, Filipino-Moro refugees comprising Tausūg and Bajau peoples began to inhabit the island in their bid to escape from the war in the southern Philippines. Their massive presence started throughout the administration of the Muslim-led United Sabah National Organisation (USNO) of Mustapha Harun. Despite this legacy, until present, neither the Malaysian federal government nor the Sabah state government officially recognises the settlement and the inhabitants, as they are known as illegal immigrants. The eastern shore of Gaya Island supports a well-known illegal Filipino colony, called Kampung Lok Urai (Lok Urai Village), with stilt houses girdling the beach as far as the eye can see. It has a large floating population of largely Muslim Filipinos who provide the capital city of Kota Kinabalu with a source of cheap labour. It is considered a dangerous, high-crime or "no-go" area by both the police and Sabahan locals. The stilt houses are linked by walkways of weathered planks. As the population grew, new houses spread seaward, with no regard for sanitation. The population on the island have also been criticised for their rubbish-throwing attitude, where most of the rubbish will be found floating around the sea near their settlements. Three fires in 1994, 1998 and 2014 have wiped out nearly half of Pondo Village.

The Sabah state government has since been working to end the Filipino squatter problems that have become the main cause for rampant crimes, terrorism and drug trafficking in the state, especially in Kota Kinabalu, as their location is too close to business areas, by relocating these squatters to a proper place for proper management, while many of the problematic, illegal immigrants will be deported back to the Philippines and their further entry will be prevented. After the fire in Pondo Village in 2014, the Sabah state government has proposed to move the illegal immigrants on the island to Kinarut with a better facility of modern houses. This proposal has been vehemently opposed by Sabahan citizens, including some demands addressed to the Chief Minister at the time, Musa Aman, to resign for mishandling his power. In late 2016, the state government submitted recommendations to the Malaysian federal government through the Main Committee on Management of Foreigners to move any refugee placement schemes in the state to other more suitable locations far from the towns and industrial development areas. The squatters' relocation is in line with the Kota Kinabalu metropolitan development to turn Gaya Island into a city island and tourism hub. In 2024, Chief Minister Hajiji Noor urged for an immediate relocation of the island residents to the mainland to allow the island to be transformed into a tourist destination, by which the early original island inhabitants of West Coast Bajaus and Ubian, supported by indigenous Kadazan-Dusuns member of parliament (MP) Marcus Mojigoh, would distance the original inhabitants from the illegal immigrants by opposing the relocation plan from their ancestral lands.

== Geography ==
The island is situated off the western coast of northern Borneo, opposite the city of Kota Kinabalu and the Likas residential and commercial district, the former Likas Plain. Its geographical characteristic is a hilly, forested island with coral reefs, mangrove forests, and beaches. With a size of 1,483 hectares (3,665 acres), it is the largest island within the Tunku Abdul Rahman Park (TARP). Before the Ice Age, the islands of the present TARP, including Gaya, formed part of the Crocker Range formation, consisting of a mass of sandstone and sedimentary rock on the mainland of northern Borneo. Around a million years ago, the melting ice brought about changes in the sea level, and parts of the mainland were cut off by the sea to form the five islands of Gaya, Sapi, Manukan, Mamutik, and Sulug, which can be seen from the exposed sandstone of the coastline forming the cliffs, caves, honeycombs, and deep crevices. The highest point on the island is located in the centre, the Gaya Island High Point (Malay: Puncak Tinggi Pulau Gaya), at a height of 300 metres (980 ft).

It features a high biodiversity, with mammal species such as the red giant flying squirrel, proboscis monkey, long-tailed macaque, Sunda pangolin, Bornean wild boar, and reptile such as monitor lizards. The island also became the home for several bird species, such as the oriental pied hornbill, the collared kingfisher, and the rare Philippine megapode. The surrounding waters feature a variety of fish species, such as the black-blotched porcupinefish and two-lined monocle bream, along with various corals, crustaceans, and seagrass.

=== Climate ===
The island features a tropical rainforest climate (Af), characterised by high temperatures and humidity year-round, with average temperatures between 25 °C (77 °F) and 32 °C (90 °F). Two monsoon seasons occur on the island, from March to early September, which is suitable for activities like snorkelling and diving, while the second monsoon season, from November to February, is marked by heavy rainfall and rougher seas.

=== Conservation sites ===
Since 1923, the island has been gazetted as a forest reserve by the authority of British North Borneo. Further, in 1974, the island was gazetted as TARP by Sabah Parks. The areas within the TARP also became the rehabilitation site of the marine ecosystem, with Gaya Island Resort Marine Centre initiating its turtle rescue programme, especially for endangered turtle species such as the green sea turtle and hawksbill turtle. Through collaboration with Reef Check Malaysia, an organisation that promotes coral reef conservation and management in the country, the marine centre also works in part on the coral reef restoration within the island. The Gaya Island Resort Wildlife Centre focuses on its land wildlife habitat conservation, such as the proboscis monkey, with an estimate of a hundred living around the island.

== Demographics ==
The island is inhabited by several ethnic groups, the most being the West Coast Bajau, Kagayan and Ubian, the Bruneian Malays, Bisaya, Rungus, Chinese and Suluk, including recent migrants of Moro ethnic groups arriving from the southern part of the Philippines due to the Moro conflict in the 1970s. In 1884, prior to the establishment of British settlement on the island, the population stood around 384 people, with around 70 Chinese people. By 2024, the population had increased to over 20,000–30,000, with only 1,000 of the residents being born from the original inhabitants throughout the British administration and before the massive influx of migrants.

== Economy ==
The main sources of income for the Gaya Island inhabitants are fishing and harvesting marine life such as sea cucumbers, shells, and clams, including pufferfish, with their catch sold to the markets in mainland Kota Kinabalu, such as the Anjung Kinabalu. Others also work in the boat transport sector and boat making, the island resort and hotel sector, while the islander women do mat weaving and craft-making from sea produce. The close proximity to the state capital also provides the city with cheap labour from the island.

== Facilities ==
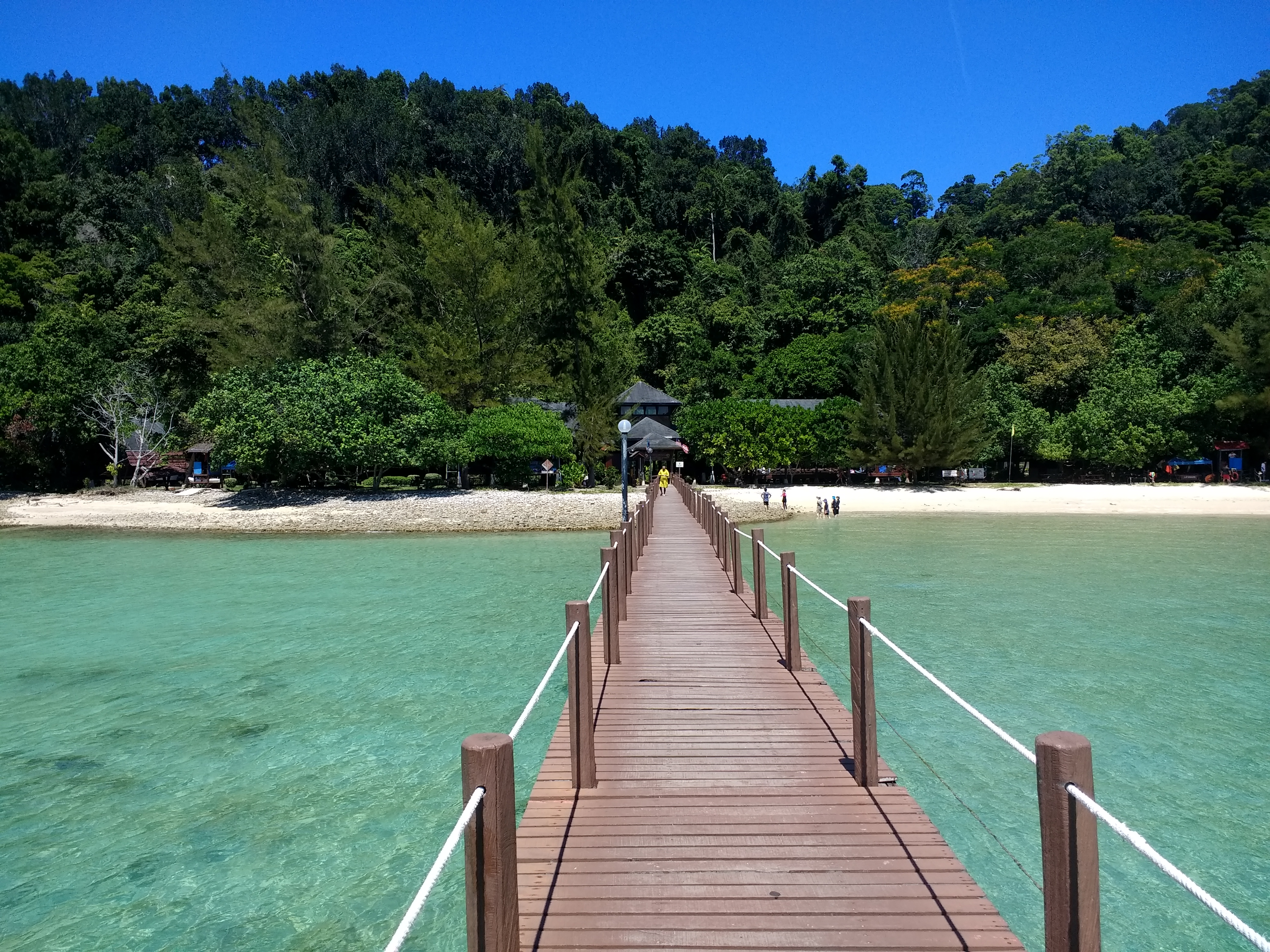
Jetty of the TARP on Gaya Island

The island once housed various administration buildings during the British period. Since the relocation of many government infrastructures to the mainland in the 1800s, the island houses the Sabah Parks jetty and other tourism facilities aside from the islanders' stilt houses. The site on the edge of Gaya Island nearest to neighbouring Sapi Island is used by the park authority, which offers a small, quiet beach for public recreational use. There are two schools serving for the education of the islanders: the primary school of SK Pulau Gaya and the secondary school of SMK Pulau Gaya. There are around three mosques within the settlements on Gaya Island, with the Al-Alif Mosque being the main mosque. In 2019, a clinic also started to be established to improve the basic health of island residents; one such clinic is the Medisinar Clinic. A zip line connecting Gaya and neighbouring Sapi Island is also available within the TARP.

=== Transportation ===
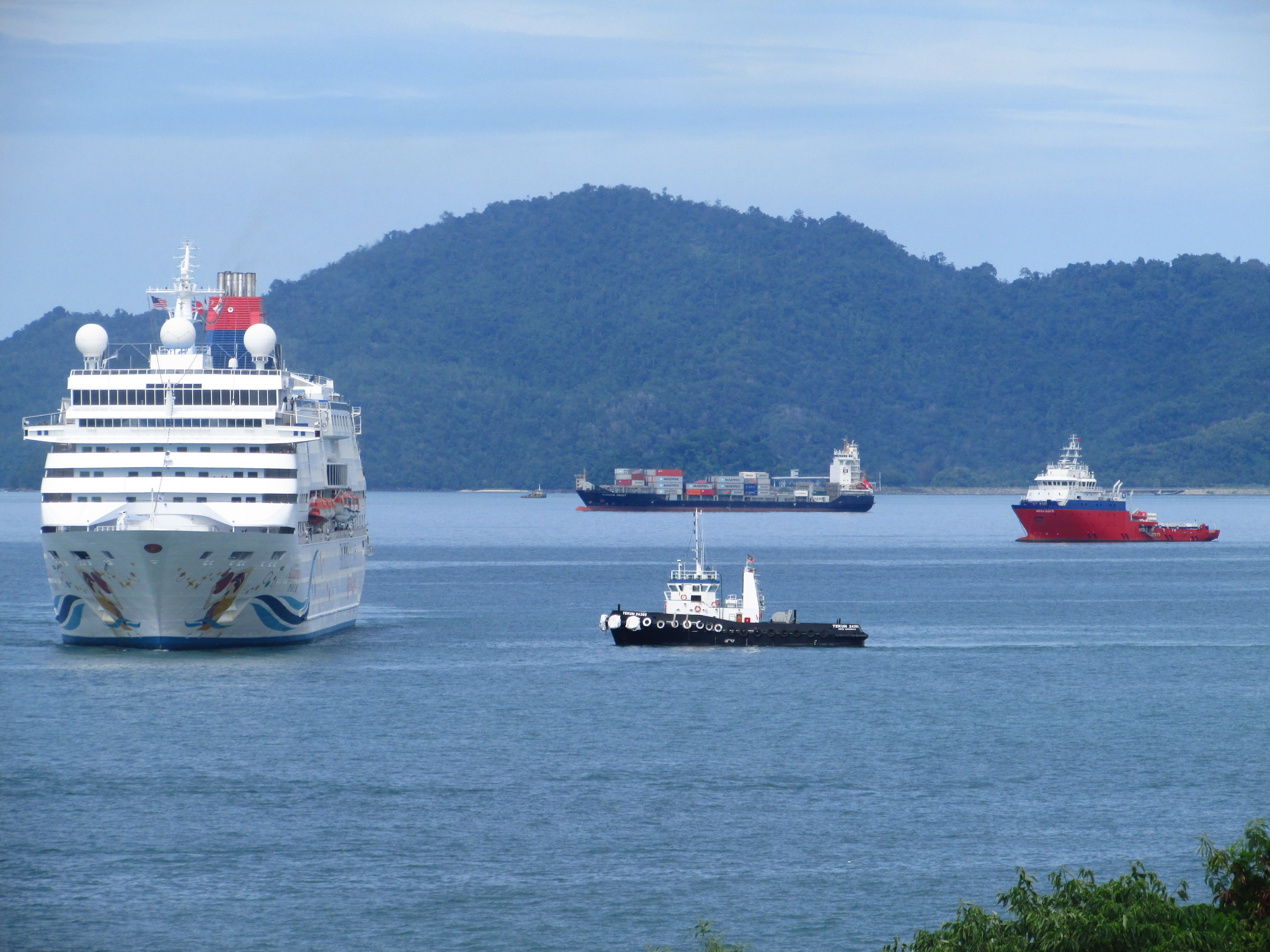
Vessels in the Gaya Bay

Jesselton Point Waterfront in the mainland of Kota Kinabalu serves as the main ferry terminal for the islands within the TARP and the resorts on the islands, such as the Bunga Raya Island Resort, Gaya Island Resort, and the Gayana Marine Resort. In 2025, the Kota Kinabalu City Hall (DBKK) opened a new tourist jetty to serve as the main transportation to the city's TARP, while ensuring safer and higher-quality transportation for tourists.

== See also ==
- List of islands of Malaysia
