= Anjung Kinabalu =

Night market in Sabah, Malaysia

Anjung Kinabalu AKINA
- Multipurpose shopping centre and night market
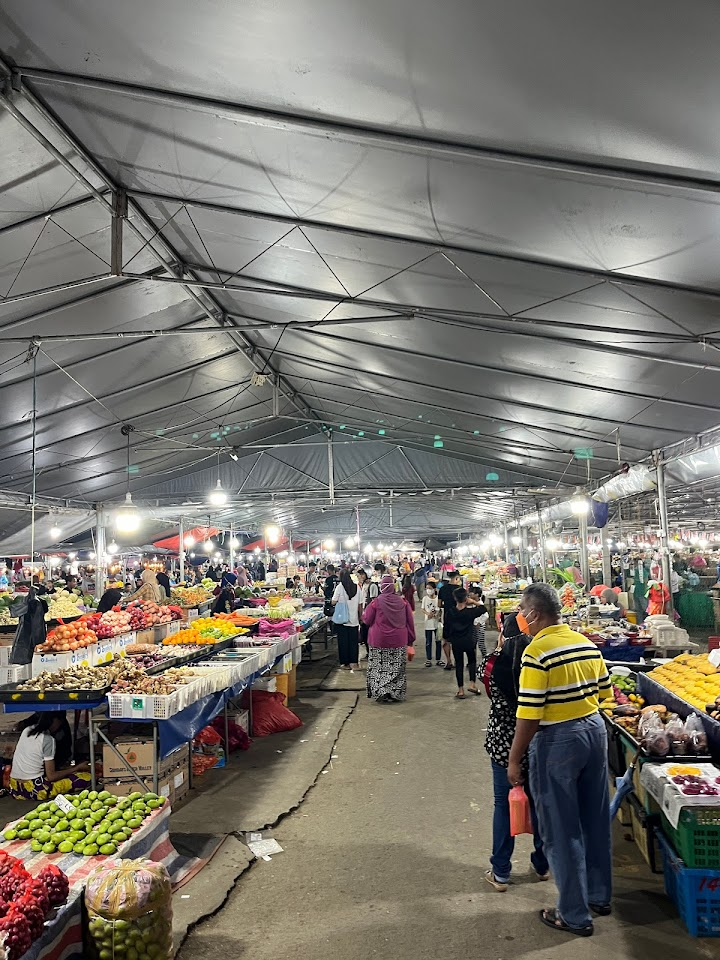
- The market in 2024

- Location within Malaysia
- Coordinates: 5°58′41″N 116°4′18″E
- Country: Malaysia
- State: Sabah
- Division: West Coast Division
- Area: Near Oceanus Mall and Wisma Merdeka, Kota Kinabalu, Sabah
- Community Organisation: Anjung Kinabalu Organisation (AKINA)

Government
  - Maintained by: Kota Kinabalu City Hall (DBKK / KKCH)
- Elevation: 572 m (1,877 ft)
- Highest elevation: 581 m (1,906 ft)

Population (2024)
  - Total: 1,150
- Time zone: GMT +08:00
- Neighbours shopping mall: Centre Point Sabah, Oceanus Mall, Wisma Merdeka, Plaza Shell
- Weekly morning market: Everyday (more kiosk will open at nights)

Anjung Kinabalu, also known as Anjung Kinabalu KK Night Market (formerly known as Night Market of Kota Kinabalu until 2024, rebranded as Anjung Kinabalu in August 2024), is a Malaysian night market located in Kota Kinabalu, Sabah, East Malaysia, showcasing the culture and foods of Sabah. The market opens as the sun sets. Anjung Kinabalu is also a spot to shop for local handicrafts and souvenirs. The market is particularly popular on weekends.

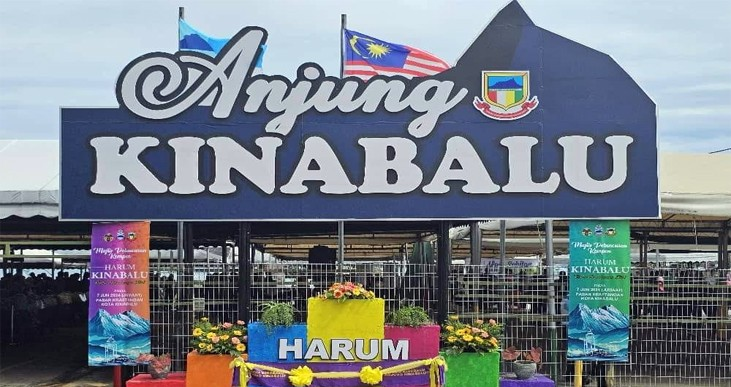
Picture of Anjung Kinabalu main entrance

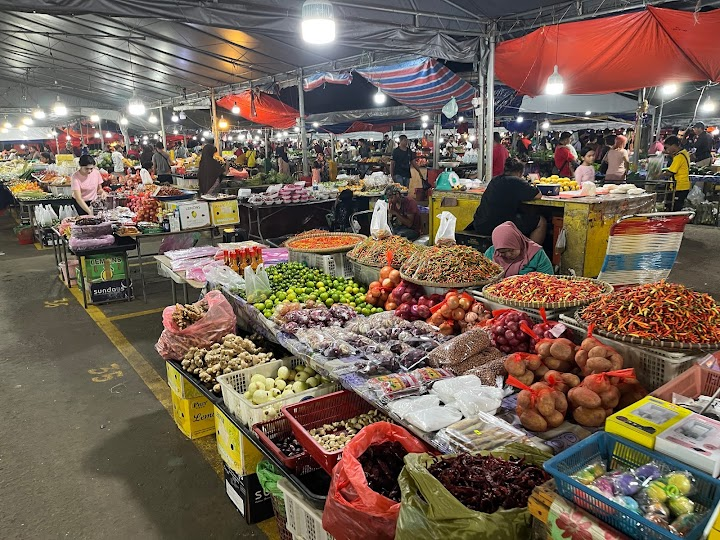
Inside view of Anjung Kinabalu

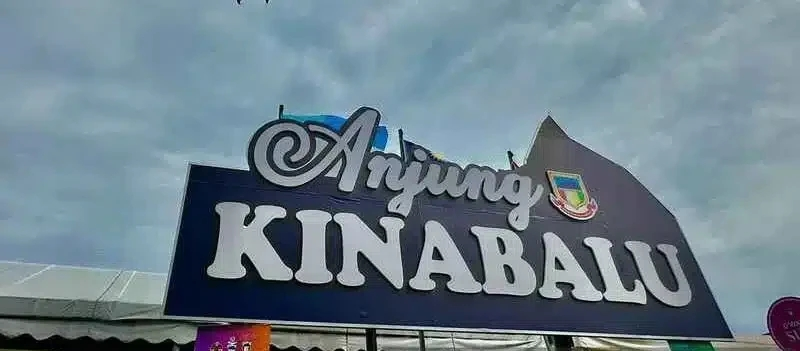
Cloudy-evening view in front of Anjung Kinabalu main entrance

== See also ==
- Centre Point Sabah
- The Skybridge City Centre Kota Kinabalu
- Wisma Merdeka
