= Wisma Merdeka =

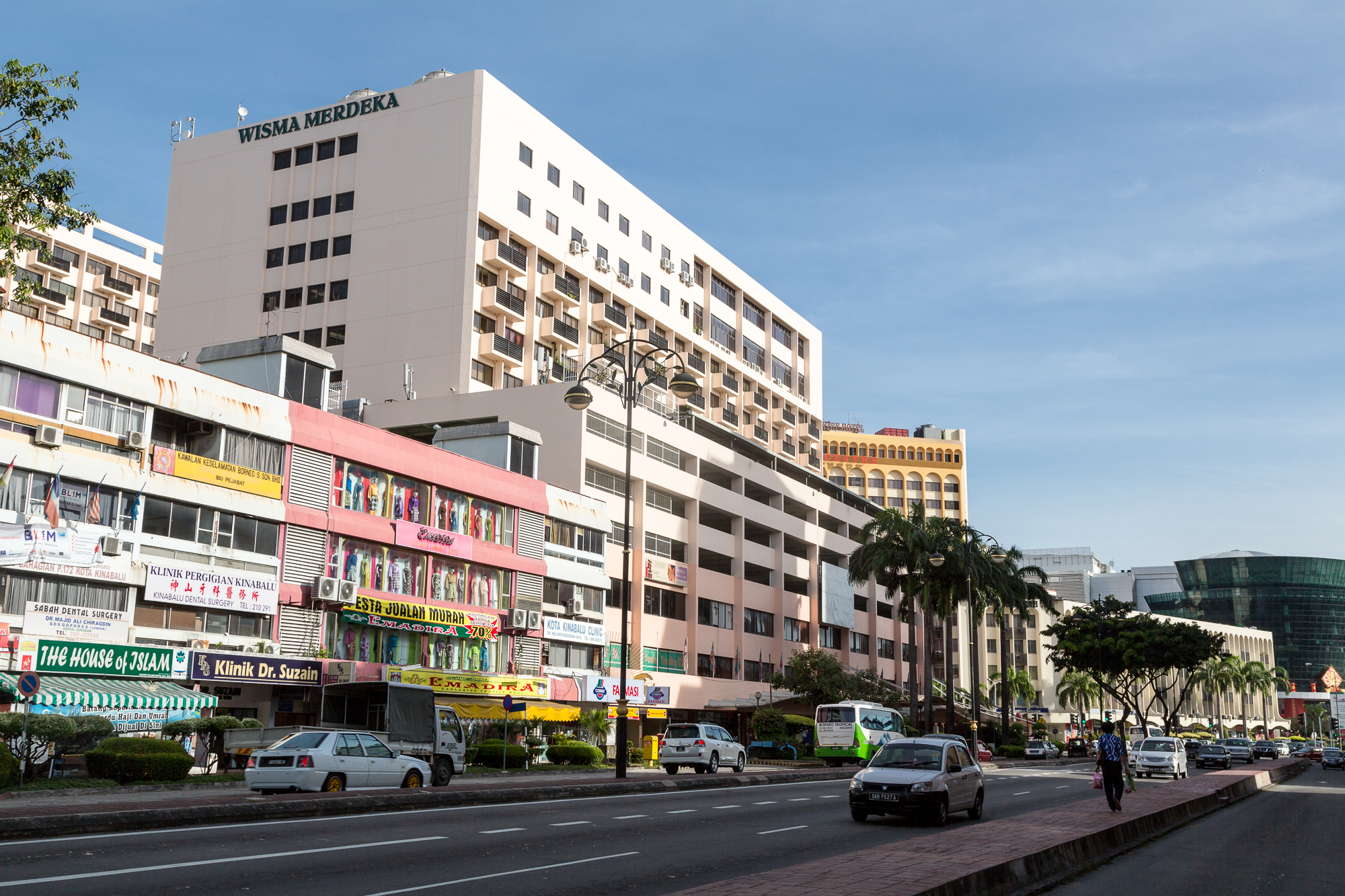
- Location: Kota Kinabalu, Sabah, Malaysia
- Coordinates: 5°59′8″N 116°4′32″E
- Address: Lot A1019-1021, 10th Floor, Phase 1, Wisma Merdeka, Tun Razak Road, 88000
- Opened: August 1985
- Website: www.wismamerdeka.com

Wisma Merdeka is a shopping centre located in the city of Kota Kinabalu, Sabah, Malaysia. It is one of the earliest shopping malls in the city, together with Centre Point Sabah and Karamunsing Complex.

Built in 1985, Wisma Merdeka was the first multi-storey shopping mall in the city with offices and parking bays. The design of the mall was inspired by Lucky Plaza in Singapore and Sungei Wang Plaza in Kuala Lumpur where shopping was being integrated into a major part of the urban lifestyle. There were a wide variety of shops operating on standard operating hours, and the air-conditioning systems provided comfort to customers in the hot tropical weather. The parking lots provided large amounts of parking space for vehicles, which was hard to find at the time.

== See also ==
- List of shopping malls in Malaysia
- The Skybridge City Centre Kota Kinabalu
