= Manukan Island =

Island in Malaysia

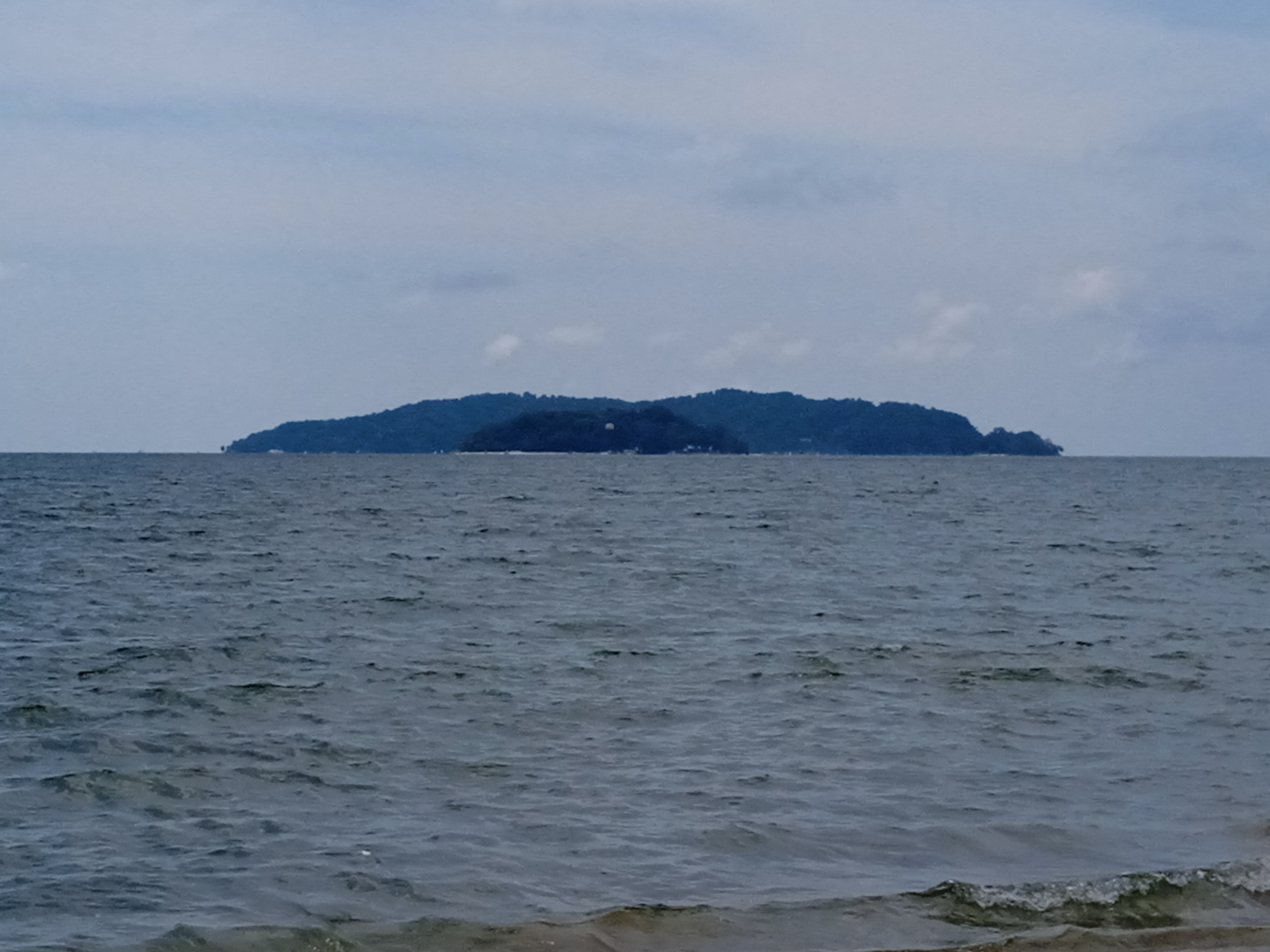
- Manukan Island from Tanjung Aru Beach
- Interactive map of Manukan Island

Geography
- Coordinates: 5°58′0″N 116°0′0″E

Administration
- Malaysia
- State: Sabah
- Division: West Coast
- District: Kota Kinabalu

Manukan Island (Malay: Pulau Manukan) is the second largest island in the Tunku Abdul Rahman National Park, Malaysia's first marine national park. It is located in the East Malaysian state of Sabah, just off the coast of Kota Kinabalu and is easily accessible by boat.

Manukan is the most popular island with Kota Kinabalu residents. Manukan has some good stretches of beaches on the southern coastline. The best beach is on the eastern tip of the island. Offshore of Manukan are coral reefs, which is ideal for snorkelling, diving and swimming. Out of the five islands making up Tunku Abdul Rahman National Park, Manukan features the most developed tourist facilities that include 20 units of chalets, a clubhouse, and few restaurants and a diving centre. Recreation facilities include a swimming pool, football field, Volleyball and Sepak Takraw courts. Infrastructural facilities include support-water, electricity, desalination plant, sewerage system, and even a solar public telephone. It is covered in dense vegetation and has hiking trails.

Jesselton Point Ferry Terminal in downtown Kota Kinabalu is the ferry terminal for those heading to the islands in Tunku Abdul Rahman National Park. This ferry terminal is also the departure point for patrons staying at the Manukan Island Resort.

== History ==
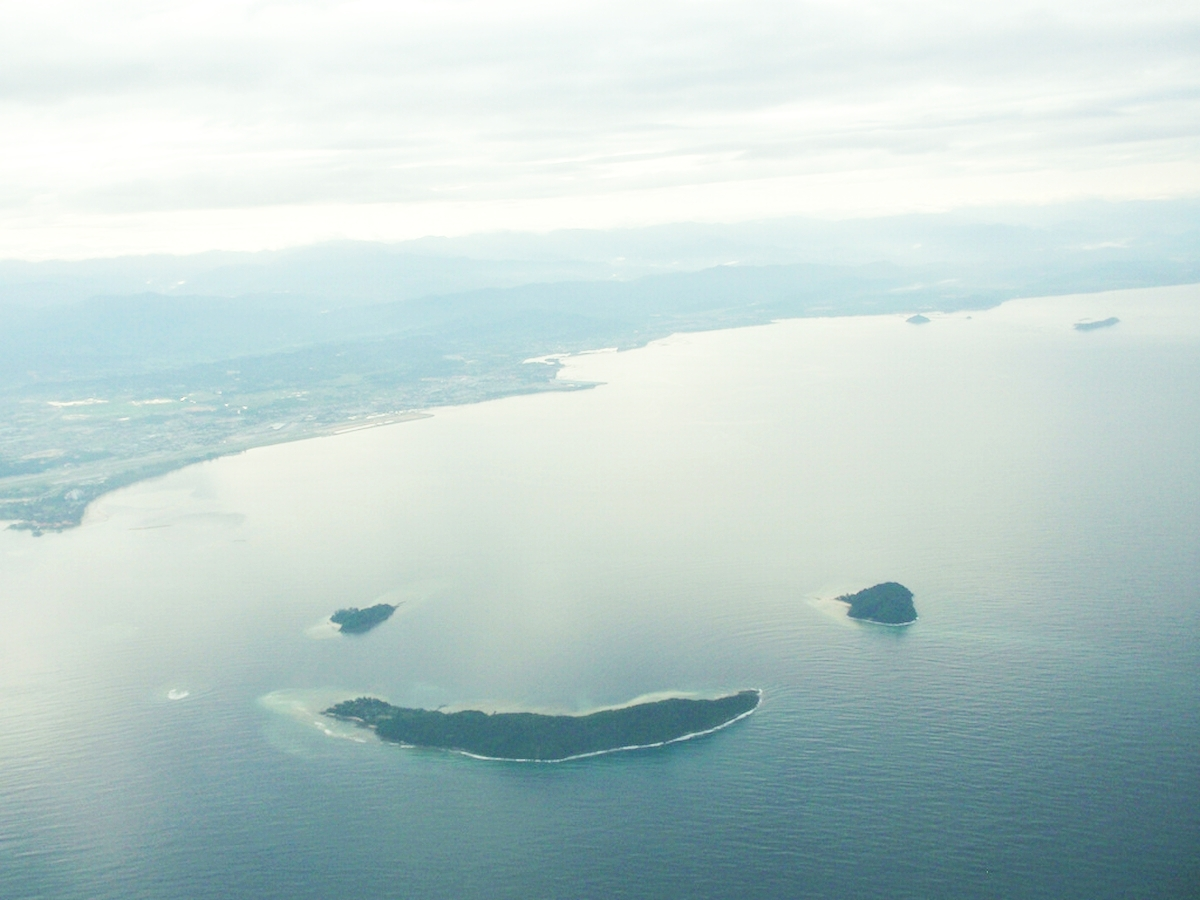
An aerial view of Mamutik (top left), Sulug (top right) and Manukan (bottom) resembles a smiling face.

Before the Ice Age, the island formed part of the Crocker Range mass of sandstone and sedimentary rock on the mainland. However, about one million years ago, the melting ice brought about changes in the sea level and parts of the mainland were cut off by the sea to form the islands of Gaya Island, Sapi, Manukan, Mamutik and Sulug. Evidence of this can be seen from the exposed sandstone of the coastline forming the cliffs, caves, honeycombs and deep crevices.

Jesselton Point Ferry Terminal in downtown Kota Kinabalu is the ferry terminal for those heading to the islands in Tunku Abdul Rahman Marine Park (Gaya Island, Sapi Island, Manukan Island, Mamutik Island and Sulug Island). This ferry terminal is also the departure point for patrons staying at either Manukan Island Resort or Gayana Resort.

In 1974, the major part of Gaya and Sapi islands was gazetted as Tunku Abdul Rahman National Park, covering an area of 8,990 acres (36.4 km^{2}). In 1979, the park was increased to 12,185 acres (49.31 km^{2}) with the inclusion of the three nearby islands of Manukan, Mamutik and Sulug islands.

== Transportation ==
The main public transportation to the island is by speedboat from Kota Kinabalu to the island jetty for about 20 minutes. Speedboats leave from Kota Kinabalu Ferry terminal (Jesselton Point Ferry Terminal) and services run from 8.30am to 4.15pm.

== Accommodation ==
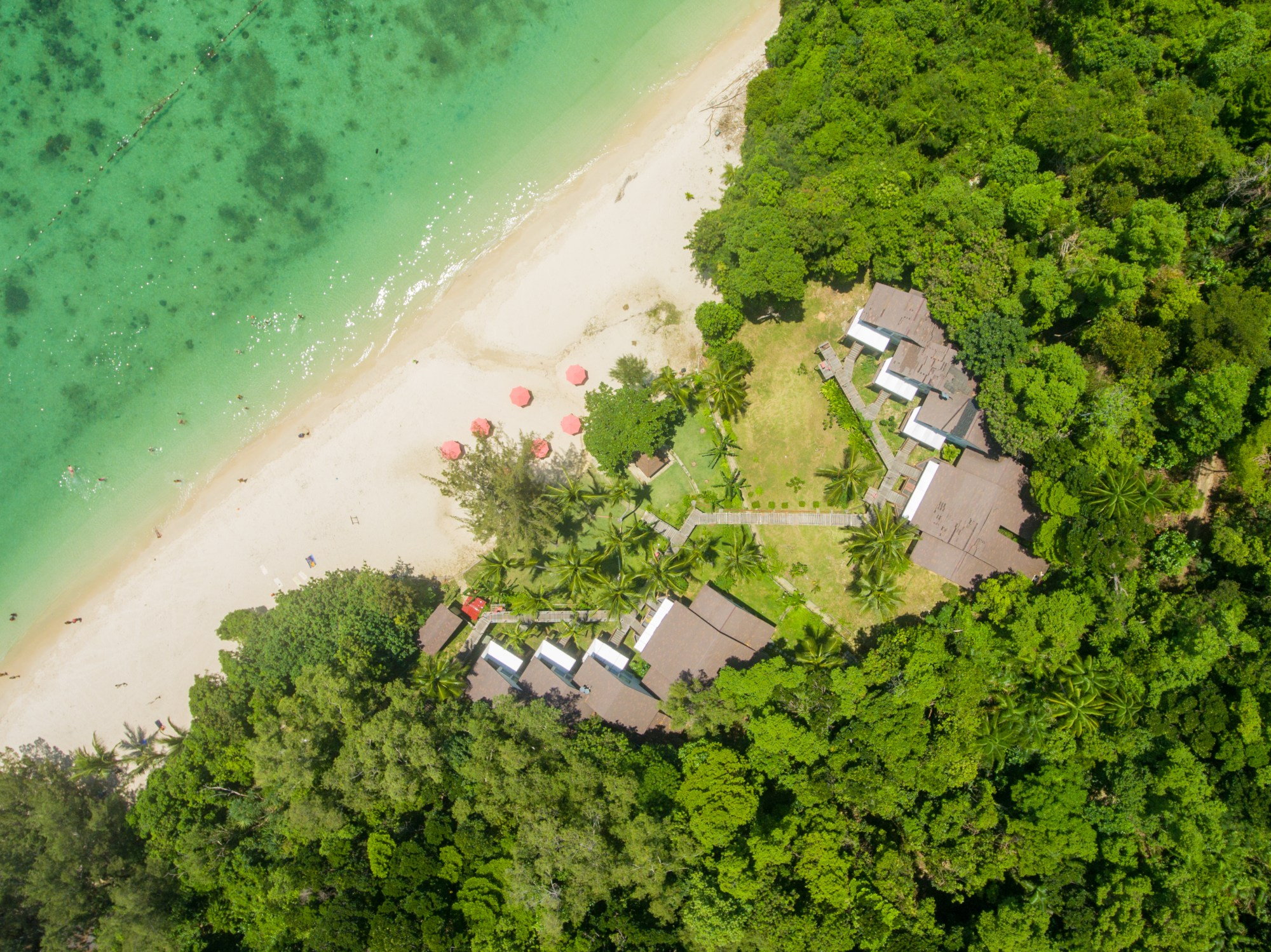
Drone footage of Manukan Island Resort.

The main resort in the island, Manukan Island Resort provides accommodation on the island. The Resort offers two restaurants which include Perahu restaurant, offering a local and international choices; and the Resort's restaurant which serves breakfast and becomes a grill for lunch.

== See also ==
- List of islands of Malaysia
