= Tunku Abdul Rahman National Park =

National park in Malaysia

- Taman Negara Tunku Abdul Rahman
- IUCN category II (national park)
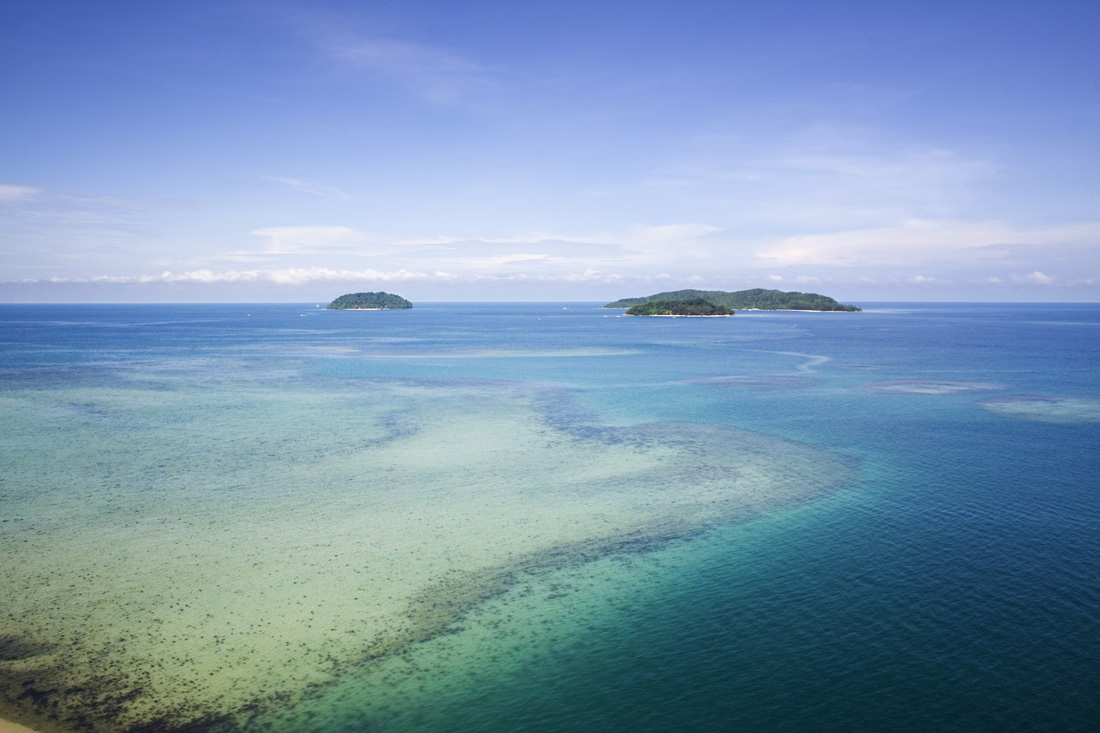
- Sulug, Mamutik and Manukan islands.

- Location within Borneo
- Location: Sabah, Malaysia
- Nearest city: Kota Kinabalu
- Coordinates: 5°58′N 116°0′E
- Area: 49 km^{2} (19 sq mi)
- Established: 1974
- Governing body: Sabah Parks

The Tunku Abdul Rahman National Park (Malay: Taman Negara Tunku Abdul Rahman) comprises a group of five islands located between 3 and 8 km off Kota Kinabalu in Sabah, Malaysia. The park is spread over 4,929 hectares, two-thirds of which cover the sea. Before the Ice age, it formed part of the Crocker Range mass of sandstone and sedimentary rock on the mainland. However, about one million years ago, the melting ice brought about changes in the sea level and parts of the mainland were cut off by the sea to form the islands of Gaya, Sapi, Manukan, Mamutik and Sulug. Evidence of this can be seen from the exposed sandstone of the coastline forming the cliffs, caves, honeycombs and deep crevices. The park was named after Tunku Abdul Rahman, Malaysia's first Prime Minister.

The ferry station for visitors travelling to the islands in Tunku Abdul Rahman National Park is located in downtown Kota Kinabalu (Gaya, Sapi, Manukan, Mamutik and Sulug). This ferry terminal is also the departure point for patrons staying at either Manukan Island Resort, Gayana Resort or Bunga Raya Resort.

== Climate ==
Temperatures are between 23.8 and 29.4 degrees Celsius all year round. Humidity remains relatively high throughout the year.

== Geology ==
The islands are underlaid by folded sandstone and sedimentary rock, are part of the Crocker Range rock formation of the western coast of Sabah. Towards the end of Ice Age happened about one million years ago, changes of the sea level occurred, resulting in portions of the mainland being cut off by the sea, thus forming the islands today. Exposed sandstone outcrops still feature the coasts of most of these islands forming cliffs, caves, honeycombs and deep crevasses along the shore.

== Gaya Island ==
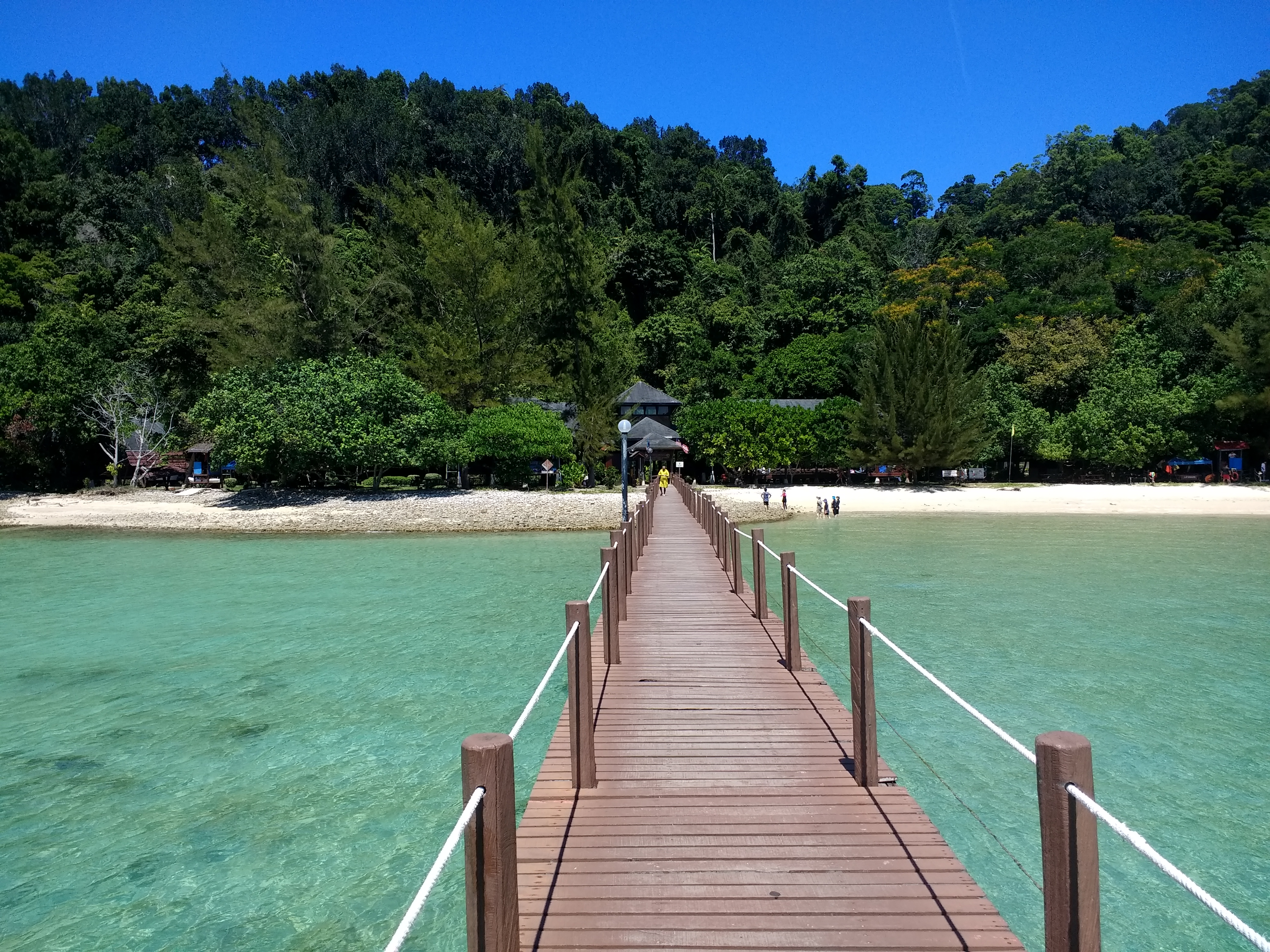
Gaya Island

Gaya Island derived its name from the Bajau word "Goyoh" which means big and occupies an area of 15 km^{2} (3,700 acres) with an elevation of up to 300 metres. Several ridges rise more than 600 feet (180 m), peaking at 1,000 feet (300 m), along the backbone of Gaya Island.

Gaya Island is the largest island in the park, closest to downtown Kota Kinabalu (KK) and is covered with dense virgin, tropical forest. It has been a forest reserve since 1923. The island has 20 km of hiking trails and two 5 star resorts named Gayana Eco Resort, home to the Marine Ecology Research Centre, and Bunga Raya Island Resort on the north-east part of the island.

Another resort is being constructed on what used to be Hornbill Bay near Gayana Eco Resort.

Gaya Island is also host to a very large (and growing) stilt village located just opposite the KK waterfront. This village is occupied by illegal immigrants from the Philippines and is considered a dangerous, high crime or "no-go" area by the police and KK locals.

Sabah Parks, the body charged with protecting the Tunku Abdul Rahman Park, is headquartered on the south-eastern part of Gaya Island in a bay shared with the Downbelow Marine & Wildlife Adventures dive station. A development on the edge of Gaya Island nearest to Sapi island is also used by Sabah Parks and offers a small, quiet beach for public recreational use.

Gaya Island is also known for a legendary beach at Police Bay. The 400 metres (0.25-mile) stretch of white sand, gently slopes out to the sea and makes Police Beach ideal for swimming in the crystal clear water. Police Beach fronts the upmarket Bunga Raya Island Resort.

The presence of coral reefs along Gaya Island’s coast makes it a diving destination near Kota Kinabalu city.

== Manukan Island ==
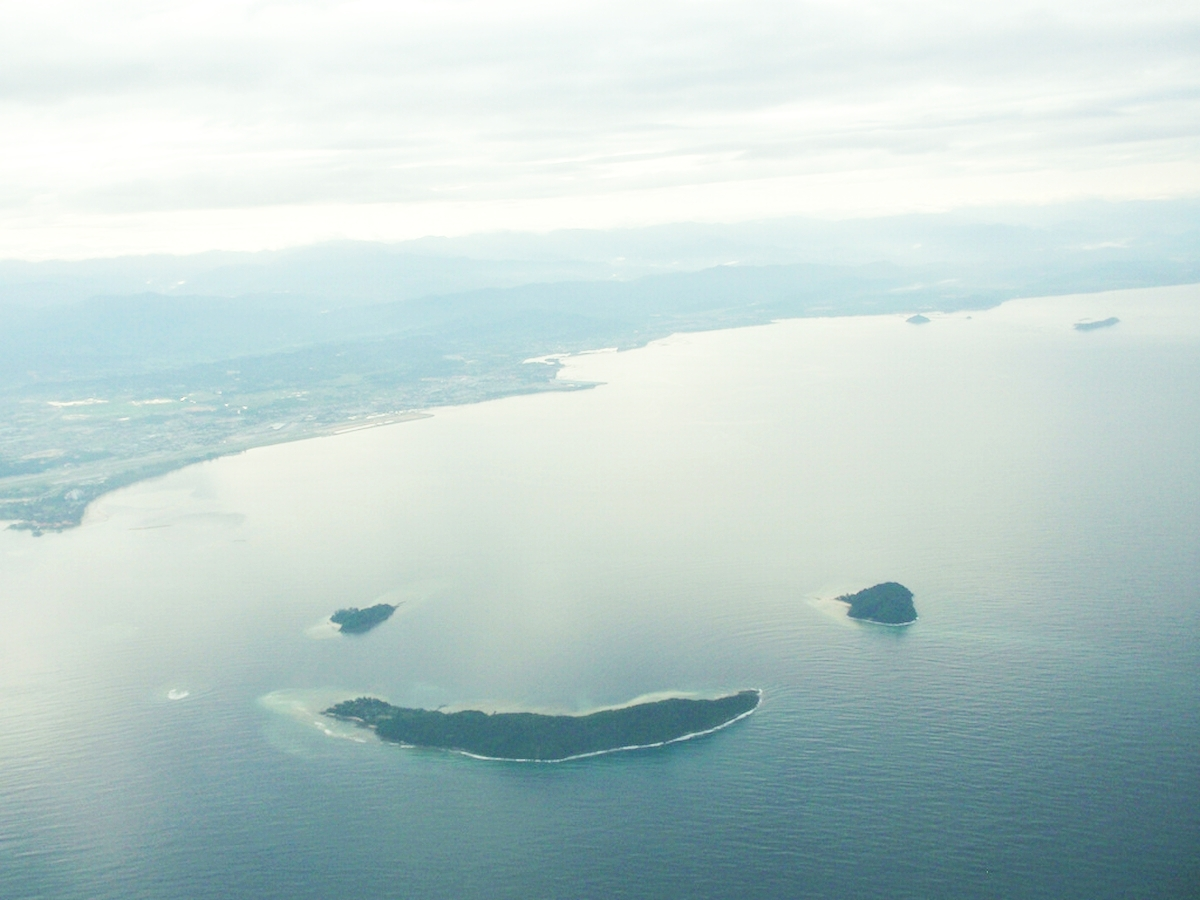
An aerial view of Mamutik (top left), Sulug (top right) and Manukan (bottom) resembling a smiling face.

The second largest island in the park, Manukan is the most popular with Kota Kinabalu residents. Manukan has some good stretches of beaches on the southern coastline. The best beach is on the eastern tip of the island. Offshore of Manukan are coral reefs, which is ideal for snorkelling, diving and swimming.

Out of 5 islands, Manukan features the most developed tourist facilities that includes 20 units of chalets, a clubhouse, and few restaurants and a diving centre. Recreation facilities include a swimming pool, football field, Volleyball and Sepak Takraw courts. Infrastructural facilities include support-water, electricity, desalination plant, sewerage system, and even a solar public telephone. It is covered in dense vegetation and has hiking trails.

== Mamutik Island ==
The 15 acres (6.1 ha) island makes Mamutik the smallest of the park. Despite being the smallest, the island offers some good beaches and coral reefs. It also has a jetty, a 3-bedroom resthouse for rent, and staff quarters for Rangers station. Facilities include changing rooms, toilets, picnic shelters, tables and barbecue pits. Fresh water and electricity are available. Mamutik would be an ideal venue to get away from it all. The corals to the north-eastern tip of the island are quite interesting. The beach is rocky and swimmers must be careful of sea urchins that exist in large numbers beside the corals and rocks.

== Sapi Island ==
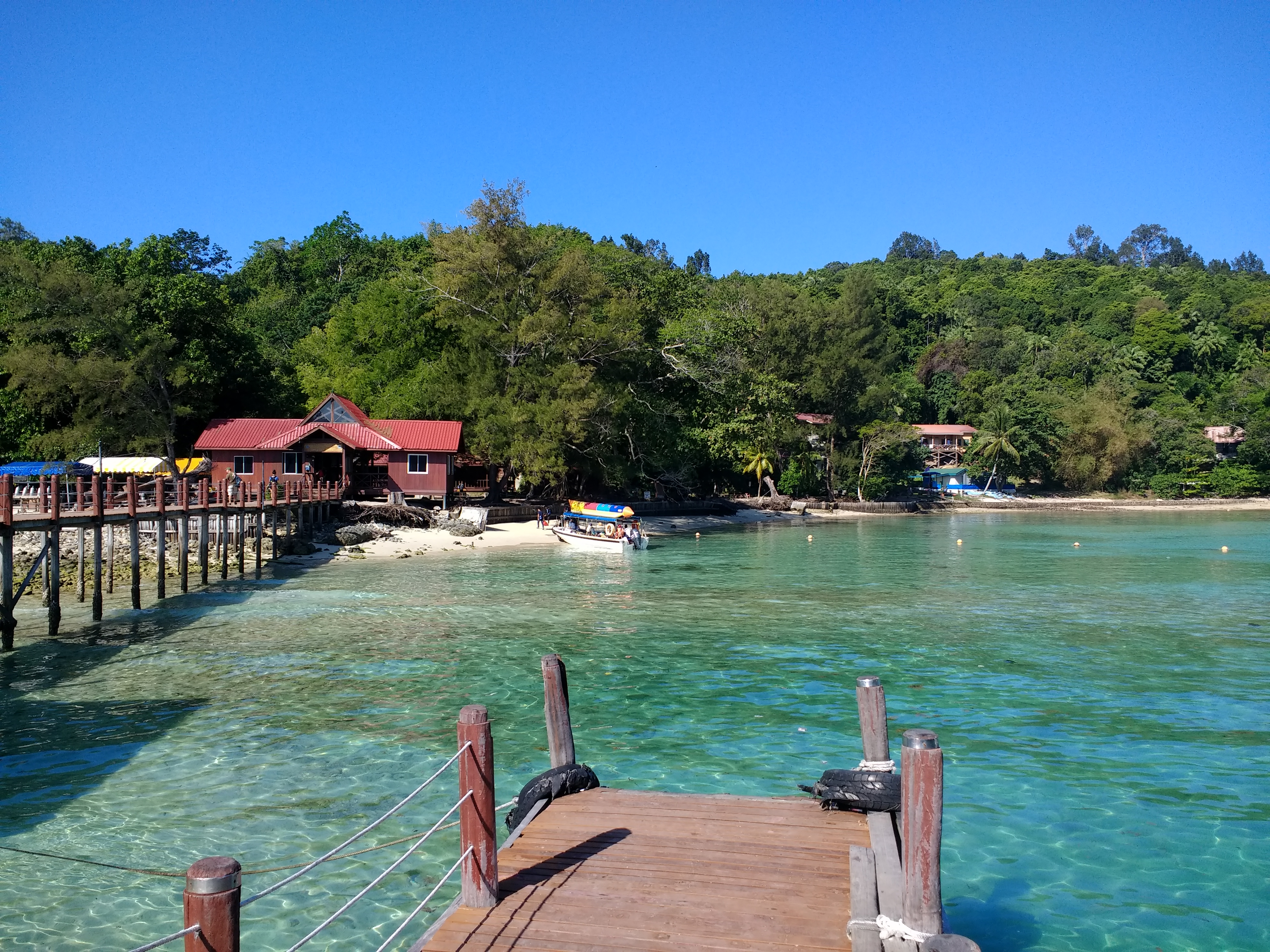
Sapi Island

Sapi Island, literally known as "Cow Island" in Malay is just off the south-western tip of Gaya Island. The 25-acre (10 ha) island features one of the nicest beaches in the park and most popular with tourists for snorkelling and scuba diving. Between 10 am and 4 pm the island gets quite busy with foreign tourists but after the last ferry leaves it becomes a tranquil island with only those staying overnight. It is developed with tourist facilities that includes a jetty, picnic shelters, barbecue pits, tables, changing rooms and toilets. The forest is inhabited by macaques. Camping and campfires are allowed with the permission from the park warden.

== Sulug Island ==
Sulug is the farthest island of them all. Considered relatively untouched, remote and undeveloped, the 20-acre (8.1 ha) island is more popular with foreign tourists who prefer a quiet and tranquil atmosphere. Good reef patches lie along the southern end of the island.

During formation, a long sand spit jutting out into the ocean formed a round hill.

== History ==
In 1882, the British North Borneo Company set up a trading settlement on Gaya Island called Api-Api. The settlement was later moved to the mainland and been named Jesselton after Sir Charles Jessel. In 1968, Jesselton was renamed Kota Kinabalu.

In 1974, the major part of Gaya and Sapi islands was gazetted as Tunku Abdul Rahman Park, covering an area of 8,990 acres (36.4 km^{2}). In 1979, the park was increased to 12,185 acres (49.31 km^{2}) with the inclusion of the three nearby islands of Manukan, Mamutik and Sulug.

== See also ==
- List of national parks of Malaysia
