= Sulug Island =

Island in Malaysia

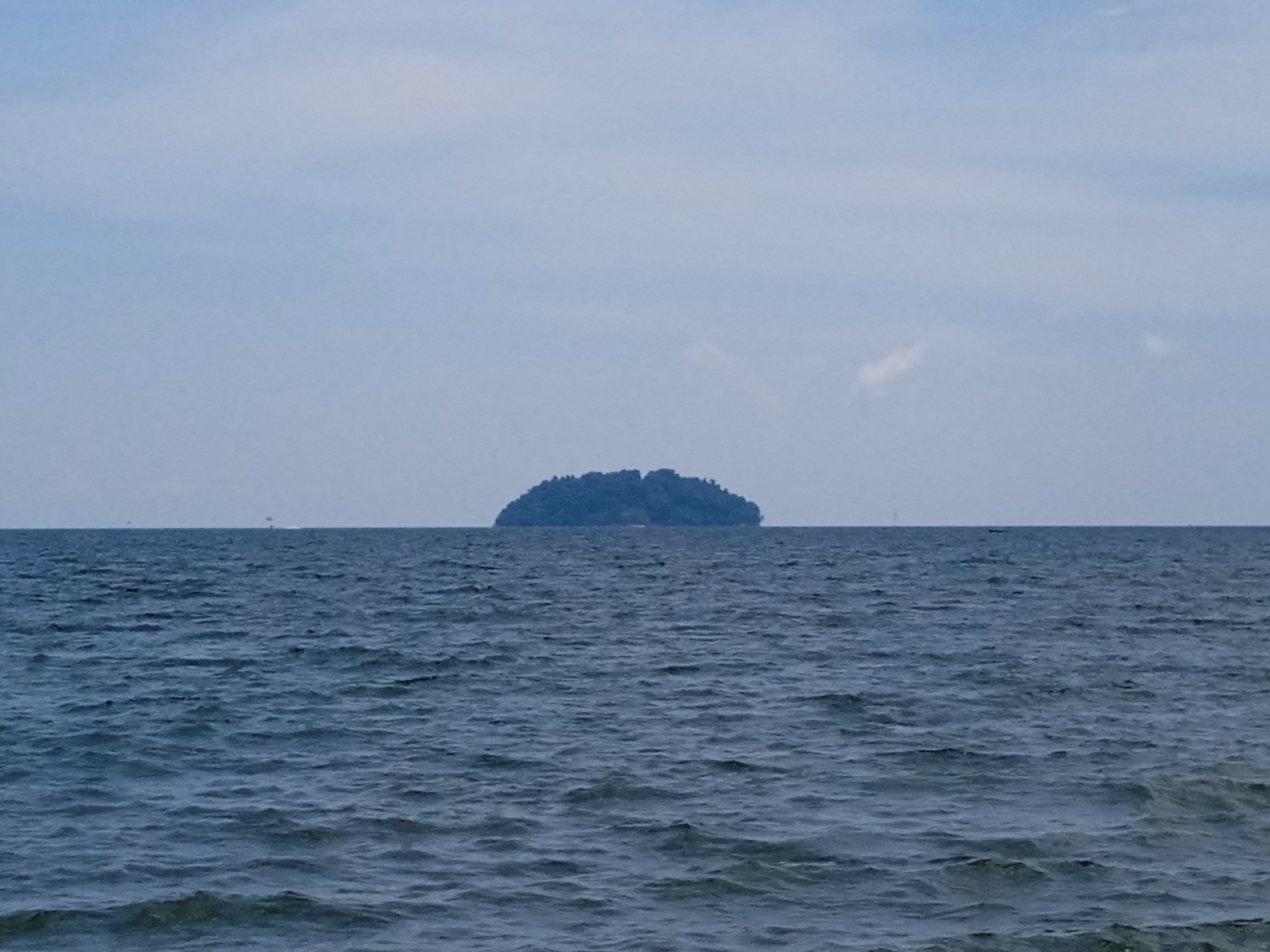
- Sulug Island from Tanjung Aru Beach
- Interactive map of Sulug Island

Geography
- Coordinates: 5°57′35″N 115°59′37″E

Administration
- Malaysia
- State: Sabah
- Division: West Coast
- District: Kota Kinabalu

Sulug Island (Malay: Pulau Sulug) is an island located in the West Coast of Sabah, Malaysia. The island is part of the Tunku Abdul Rahman National Park.

== See also ==
- List of islands of Malaysia
