= Centre Point Sabah =

Shopping centre in East Malaysia

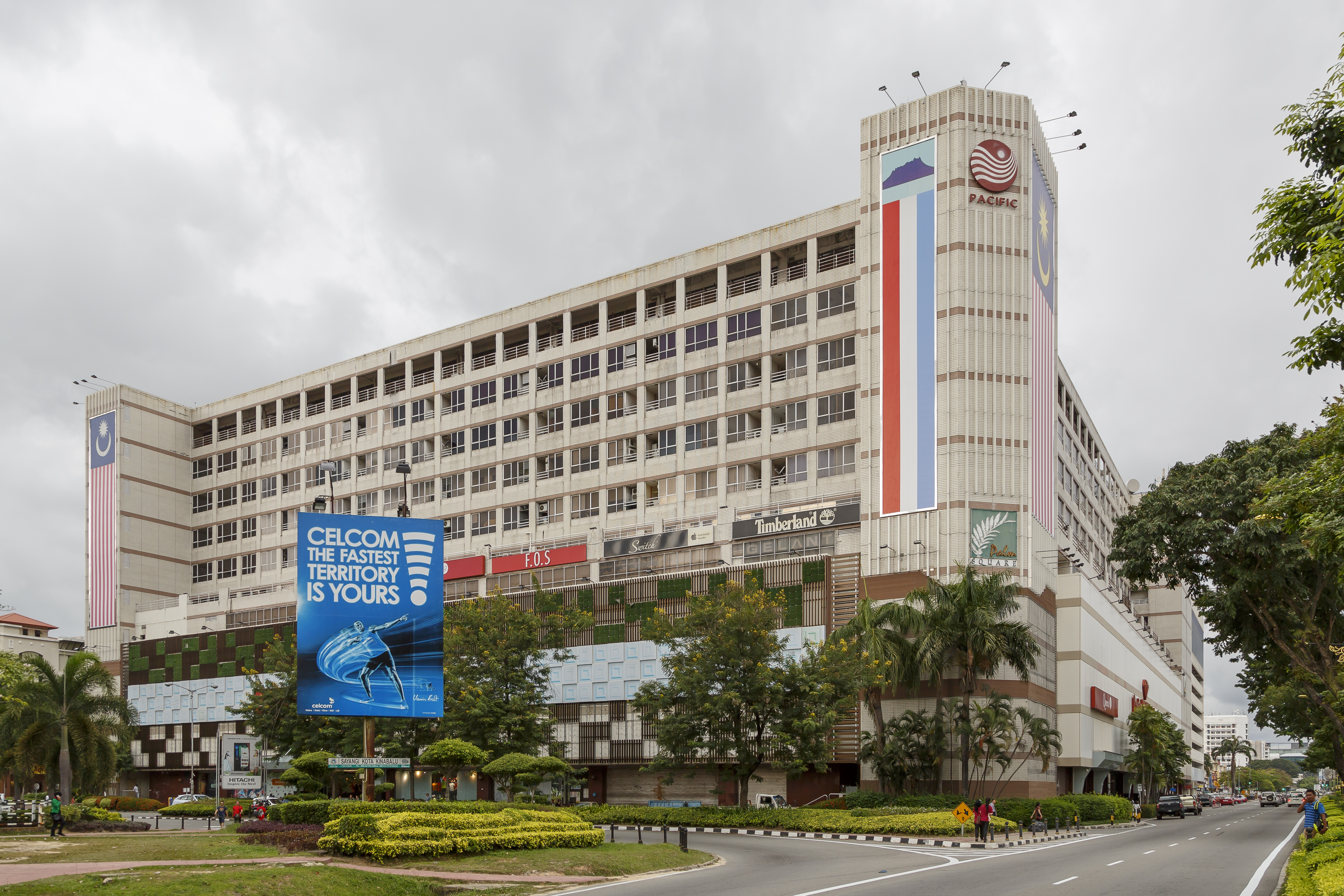
- Location: Kota Kinabalu, Sabah, Malaysia
- Coordinates: 5°58′41″N 116°4′18″E
- Address: 1, Jalan Centre Point, 88000
- Developer: Pan-Pacific Construction Holdings Sdn Bhd
- Website: www.centrepointsabah.com

Centre Point Sabah is a Malaysian shopping centre located in Kota Kinabalu, Sabah, East Malaysia. It is one of the earliest shopping malls in the city of Kota Kinabalu, along with the Karamunsing Complex and Wisma Merdeka. In 2024, this shopping centre officially connected with other shopping malls through The Skybridge City Centre Kota Kinabalu.

== History ==
The development of the shopping centre building project was taken over by Sunyap Development Sdn Bhd, a local development company wholly owned by Pacific Construction Co. Ltd. from Taiwan, in collaboration with the Kota Kinabalu City Hall. The shopping centre was built on land with an area of 4.6 acres over three phases. During the first phase and the second phase, a total of six floors were built containing a supermarket, 400 shops, 1,380 parking spaces, one floor for office use, another floor for entertainment areas such as a bowling centre, cinema, recreation centre for families. The shopping centre began operating on 24 July 1990. It was inaugurated by the chief minister of Sabah Joseph Pairin Kitingan on 25 August 1990.

== See also ==
- The Skybridge City Centre Kota Kinabalu
- Wisma Merdeka
