= Sabah Parks =

Conservation-based statutory body

Sabah Parks (Malay: Taman-Taman Sabah) is a conservation-based statutory body established in 1964 with the purpose of conserving the scenic, scientific and historic heritage of the state of Sabah, Malaysia, on the island of Borneo. The organisation is also responsible for the management and promotion of the various protected reserves in Sabah, in particular those designated as national parks. It is also mandated to develop tourism-friendly facilities to accommodate tourist arrivals to these reserves and ensure that the state of the reserves is not compromised. The first choice for inclusion in a park system was Mount Kinabalu. As a result, Kinabalu Park was gazetted in 1964, and today it is designated as a World Heritage Site.

Sabah Parks is managed by a board of trustees also known as Sabah Parks Trustees, which consists of a chairman, deputy chairman, three ex officio members, four other members, and a director.

== National Parks ==
- Kinabalu Park
- Turtle Islands Park
- Tunku Abdul Rahman Park
- Pulau Tiga Park
- Tawau Hills Park
- Crocker Range Park
- Tun Sakaran Marine Park
- Sipadan Island Park (land has been gazetted)

== See also ==
- List of national parks of Malaysia
- Department of Wildlife and National Parks
