= The Skybridge City Centre Kota Kinabalu =

Pedestrian Skybridge in Sabah, Malaysia

The Skybridge City Centre Kota Kinabalu Jambatan Langit Pusat Bandar Kota Kinabalu
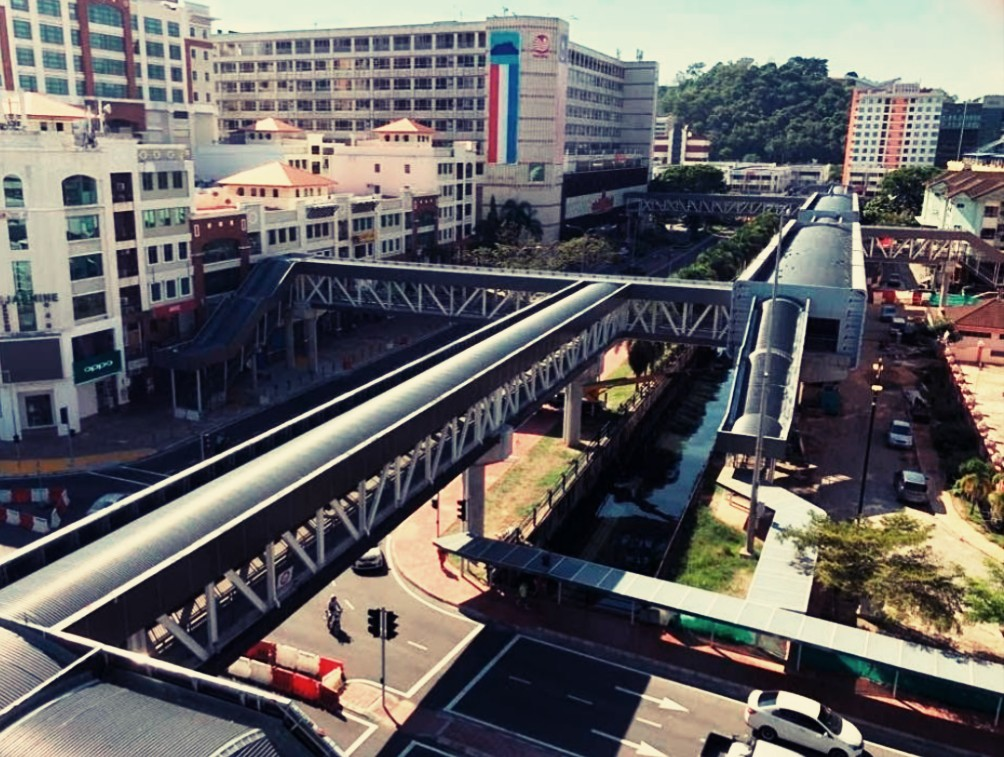
- Kota Kinabalu sky bridge in 2024
- Carries: Pedestrian
- Crosses: OCEANUS Mall, Centre Point Sabah, IMAGO Mall pavement, Api-Api Centre, Marriott Hotel, The Hilton KK, Marina Court Sabah, Asia City
- Locale: Kota Kinabalu
- Official name: The SkyBridge City Centre Kota Kinabalu
- Maintained by: Kota Kinabalu City Hall (DBKK / KKCH)

Characteristics
- Design: 90 degree pedestrian block concrete bridge
- Total length: 400 m (1,300 ft)

History
- Architect: Petrofiq Sdn Bhd (2017–2018, 2020–2021); Sabah Maju Jaya Sdn Bhd (2021–2024, 2025 improvement)
- Designer: Sunsea Development Sdn Bhd; Petrofiq Sdn Bhd; Sabah Maju Jaya Sdn Bhd; DBKK / KKCH
- Engineering design by: Petrofiq Sdn Bhd; Sabah Maju Jaya (SMJ) Sdn Bhd
- Constructed by: Petrofiq Sdn Bhd; Sabah Maju Jaya (SMJ) Sdn Bhd
- Opened: 31 December 2023; 2 years ago

The Skybridge City Centre Kota Kinabalu or well known as The Sabahan KK Skybridge is a Skyway and pedestrian zone bridge in Sabah, Malaysia. It is recorded as the first longest Skyway of Sabah in 2024. Located near Centre Point Sabah, one of the shopping centres in Kota Kinabalu city, the KK Skybridge was officiated by the 16th Sabah Chief Minister Hajiji Noor, which is equipped with escalators, an elevator for the disabled and 20 air-conditioned retail kiosks.

== Background ==
The KK Skybridge project aims to provide a safe convenience for the public and also for the disabled to move around as it currently links Oceanus Shopping Mall, Api-Api Centre, and Asia City.

In conjunction with the Centre Point Mall's 32nd anniversary in August 2022, the Centre Point shopping centre mall has planned several events, which include the Cosmaniac Cosplay Showdown (6–7 August 2022), Mobile Legends Bang Bang Champion (13–14 August 2022), Pikachu Showcase (21–27 August 2022) and Shop and Redeem: Free Lunch Bag (9–22 September 2022).

The Hilton KK and Marriott KK are about 2 kilometres away from each other, but a Grab ride including the waiting time took a person close to 20 minutes. However, The Skybridge Kota Kinabalu has changed the walktime and time perspective for pedestrian since 2024.

This Sky Bridge is a total of 400m long and it connects with major malls and hotels nearby. At least four malls and four hotels are connected via this semi Air conditioned sky bridge system. Both sides of the major entrance and exit of this sky bridge have escalators and lifts.

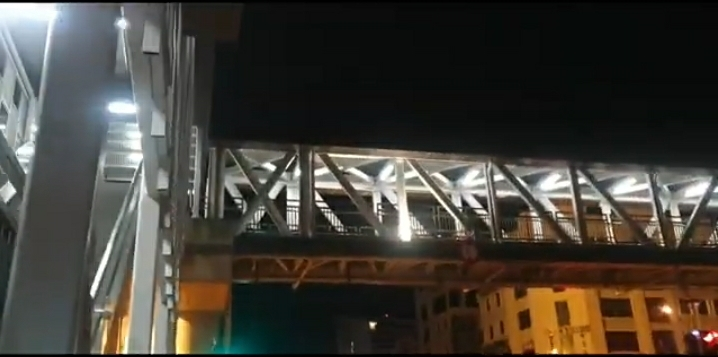
Night view from outside of Kota Kinabalu Skybridge

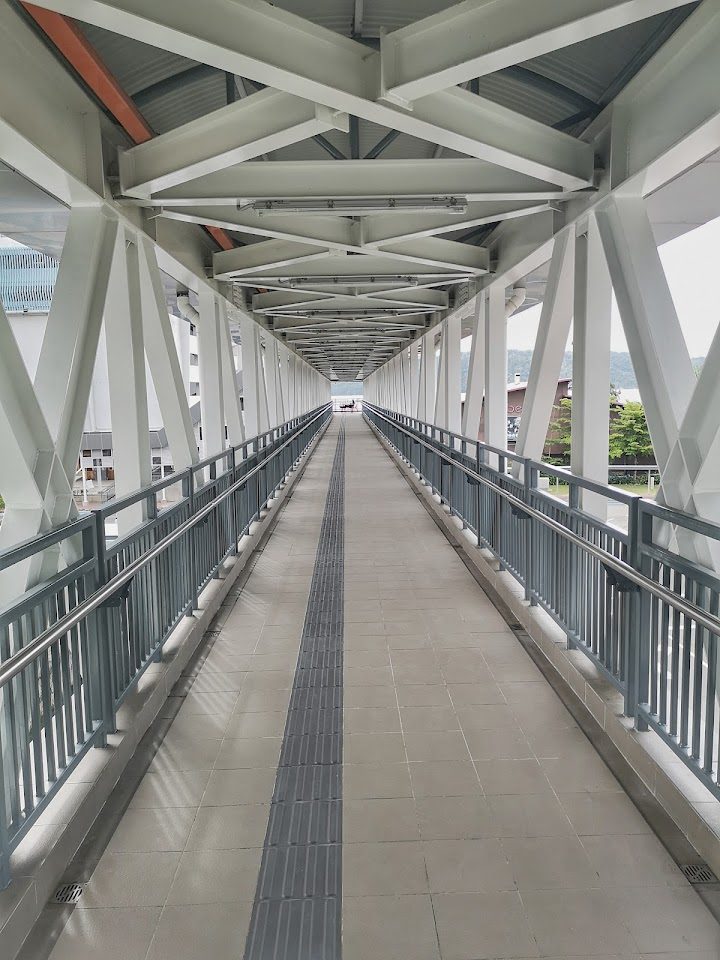
Inside view of The Skybridge City Centre Kota Kinabalu, Sabah

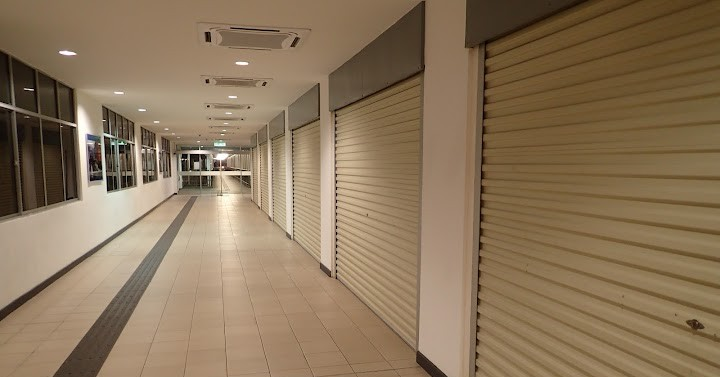
Air-conditioned Retail Kiosks inside of the KK Skybridge

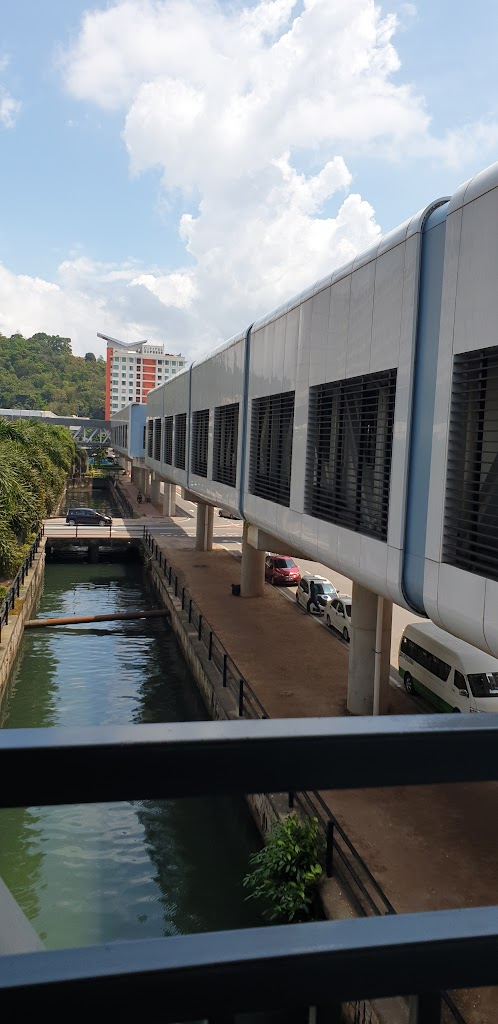
Morning view from outside of Kota Kinabalu Skybridge

== See also ==
- Greater Kota Kinabalu
