= Unduk Ngadau 2021 =

2022 beauty pageant in Malaysia

- Date: 31 May 2021
- Presenters: May Salitah; Denis Primus
- Entertainment: Sheldon Elev
- Venue: Hongkod Koisaan Hall, KDCA, Penampang, Sabah
- Broadcaster: Kaamatan TV
- Entrants: 79
- Placements: 21
- Winner: Maya Hejnowska; Api-Api
- Congeniality: Maya Hejnowska (Api-Api)
- Natural Beauty: Tracie Sinidol (Tambunan)
- Best Evening Dress: Emily Chung (Luyang)

Unduk Ngadau 2021, the 61st edition of the Unduk Ngadau, was held on 31 May 2021 at Hongkod Koisaan Hall, KDCA, Penampang, Sabah. Maya Hejnowska of Api-Api was crowned by the outgoing titleholder, Francisca Ester Nain of Karambunai at the end of the event. Different from the Unduk Ngadau editions of the past years, this edition was held with a strict health protocol as it was still in the era of the COVID-19 pandemic.

== Results ==
Through online selection, judges selected 21 finalists from the 79 delegates.

| Final Results | Contestants |
|---|---|
| Unduk Ngadau 2021 | Api-Api – Maya Hejnowska |
| 1st Runner–Up | Paginatan – Dianarin Vahidin |
| 2nd Runner–Up | Kundasang – Febby Angelica Richard |
| 3rd Runner–Up | Tulid – Lisa Christie Deminic |
| 4th Runner-Up | Tanjung Keramat – Avrill Elvira Roger Anthony |
| 5th Runner-Up | Kawang – Sharon Stephen |
| 6th Runner-Up | Moyog – Carrey Evanne Kim Lee |
| Top 21 | Balung – Rozeline John; Elopura – Valerieana Karen Aldrin; Kiulu - Brolyn Bilid Benjamin; Limbahau - Crystell Esther Kim Lee; Luyang – Emily Chung; Matunggong – Malle Christian Anderson; Melalap – Ivy Elchrisstia Edin; Membakut - Michelle Yong; Nabawan – Kareline Bukah; Pantai Manis - Abigail Paul Makajil; Petagas – Felcy Fransie Julian; Tambunan - Tracie Sinidol; Tamparuli – Belkage Sindam Paing; Telupid - Kimberley Lim |

== Contestants ==
79 delegates in total competed through online platform.

| No. | District/Constituency | DUN | Contestant | Awards |
|---|---|---|---|---|
| 1 | Kudat | Banggi | H. Irenie Hilary | |
| 2 | Kudat | Bengkoka | Evianne Felliona Ford | |
| 3 | Kudat | Pitas | Joanna Mathilda Jaini | |
| 4 | Kudat | Tanjong Kapor | Lilliean Lasrin | |
| 5 | Kota Marudu | Matunggong | Malle Christian Anderson Barlus | Top 21; Miss Glamour |
| 6 | Kota Marudu | Bandau | J Debbie Angelissa Johil | |
| 7 | Kota Marudu | Tandek | Sizlin Zitol | |
| 8 | Kota Belud | Pintasan | Crisnila Katy Jupli | |
| 9 | Kota Belud | Tempasuk | Charlatte Suea Ann Jinus | |
| 10 | Kota Belud | Usukan | Melni Dihal | |
| 11 | Kota Belud | Kadamaian | Norianie Saidin | |
| 12 | Tuaran | Sulaman | Cylonnie Ceshiela Chee | Miss Fantastic |
| 13 | Tuaran | Pantai Dalit | Evva Grace Jaibet | |
| 14 | Tuaran | Tamparuli | Belkage Sindam Paing | Top 21; Miss Joy |
| 15 | Tuaran | Kiulu | Brolyn Bilid Benjamin | Top 21 |
| 16 | Sepanggar | Karambunai | Chee Nyuk Len | |
| 17 | Sepanggar | Darau | Vanessa Gray Chew Li Hua | |
| 18 | Sepanggar | Inanam | Sharlene Adelaide Alexandra | |
| 19 | Kota Kinabalu | Likas | Christine Regina Carmelita Manjaji | |
| 20 | Kota Kinabalu | Api-Api | Maya Hejnowska | Winner; Tati Tosuau (Congeniality); Miss Charming |
| 21 | Kota Kinabalu | Luyang | Emily Chung Yee Yen | Top 21; Basaan Tinandai Togingo (Best Evening Dress) |
| 22 | Putatan | Tanjung Aru | Flores Cuthbert | |
| 23 | Putatan | Petagas | Felcy Fransie Julian | Top 21 |
| 24 | Putatan | Tanjung Keramat | Avrill Elvira Roger Anthony | 4th Runner-Up |
| 25 | Penampang | Kepayan | Dorna Mayra Michael | |
| 26 | Penampang | Moyog | Carrey Evanne Kim Lee | 6th Runner-Up |
| 27 | Papar | Limbahau | Crystell Esther Kim Lee | Top 21 |
| 28 | Papar | Kawang | Sharon Stephen | 5th Runner-Up |
| 29 | Papar | Pantai Manis | Abigail Paul Majakil | Top 21 |
| 30 | Kimanis | Bongawan | Azecquline Lajukim | |
| 31 | Kimanis | Membakut | Michelle Yong | Top 21; Miss Popular |
| 32 | Beaufort | Klias | Eva Su Yi Enn | |
| 33 | Beaufort | Kuala Penyu | Gloria Philip | |
| 34 | Sipitang | Lumadan | Jacquelina Fefeyanty Johs | |
| 35 | Sipitang | Sindumin | Yves Deidree Yudah | |
| 36 | Ranau | Karanaan | Angela Mujini | |
| 37 | Ranau | Kundasang | Febby Angelica Richard | 2nd Runner-Up; Miss Charismatic |
| 38 | Ranau | Paginatan | Dianarin Vahidin | 1st Runner-Up |
| 39 | Keningau | Tambunan | Tracie Sinidol | Top 21; Tati Topiodo (Natural Beauty); Miss Beautiful |
| 40 | Keningau | Bingkor | Josephine Magdeline Joseph | |
| 41 | Keningau | Liawan | Mary Anne Wong Tze Yee | |
| 42 | Tenom | Melalap | Ivy Elchrisstia Edin | Top 21 |
| 43 | Tenom | Kemabong | Ruth Erradiya | |
| 44 | Pensiangan | Tulid | Lisa Christie Deminic | 3rd Runner-Up |
| 45 | Pensiangan | Sook | Cathlana Augustine | Miss Lovely |
| 46 | Pensiangan | Nabawan | Kareline Bukah | Top 21 |
| 47 | Beluran | Telupid | Kimberly Lim | Top 21 |
| 48 | Beluran | Sugut | Sarlianie Edrus | |
| 49 | Beluran | Labuk | Vrenda Joaan Deftenneay Taji | |
| 50 | Libaran | Gum-Gum | Annvianey Jaulis | |
| 51 | Libaran | Sungai Manila | Elda Aliu | |
| 52 | Libaran | Sungai Sibuga | Fejelyen Jumas | |
| 53 | Batu Sapi | Sekong | Shaenna Chyanti Owok | |
| 54 | Batu Sapi | Karamunting | Ereana Jane Edmund | |
| 55 | Sandakan | Elopura | Valerieana Karen Aldrin | Top 21; Miss Cute |
| 56 | Sandakan | Tanjung Papat | Chriscrollina Nasri | |
| 57 | Kinabatangan | Kuamut | Ivy Masrienah Takin | |
| 58 | Kinabatangan | Lamag | Carolyn Tony | |
| 59 | Kinabatangan | Sukau | Shesenesellis Verra Juud | |
| 60 | Lahad Datu | Tungku | Roseeltini Roverto | Miss Sweet |
| 61 | Lahad Datu | Segama | Melvinie Edol | |
| 62 | Lahad Datu | Silam | Jeferine Feliane Jefridin | |
| 63 | Lahad Datu | Kunak | Angily Akin | |
| 64 | Semporna | Sulabayan | Jessie Devianna Jack | |
| 65 | Semporna | Senallang | Gracenichelle Gilbert | |
| 66 | Semporna | Bugaya | Janeta Marie | |
| 67 | Tawau | Balung | Rozeline John | Top 21 |
| 68 | Tawau | Apas | Sharone Qc Jonim | |
| 69 | Tawau | Sri Tanjong | Christy Fitriani | |
| 70 | Kalabakan | Kukusan | Arcyca Alex | |
| 71 | Kalabakan | Tanjung Batu | Natalie Micheal Bouniu | |
| 72 | Kalabakan | Merotai | Enoffalyinda binti Kulan | |
| 73 | Kalabakan | Sebatik | Marlia Suziantey Alex Morion | |
| 74 | Klang Valley | | Gracy Jackson | |
| 75 | Labuan | | Clare Cassandra Rueben | |
| 76 | Johor | | Neldreana Saipun | |
| 77 | Malacca | | Jessica Stephen | |
| 78 | Penang | | Dionysia Ebi | |
| 79 | Perak | | Fenelyne Juilin | |
