= Unduk Ngadau 2023 =

2023 beauty pageant in Malaysia

- Date: 31 May 2023
- Presenters: May Salitah; Denis Primus
- Entertainment: Dabra Sia
- Venue: Hongkod Koisaan Hall, KDCA, Penampang, Sabah
- Broadcaster: TV Sabah
- Entrants: 50
- Placements: 15
- Winner: Carol Abbey Gail Grimaldi; Papar
- Congeniality: Devegrayc Justin; Likas
- Natural Beauty: Adelyn Tillon; Karambunai
- Best Evening Dress: Calby Floresa Dolinting; Kota Marudu

Unduk Ngadau 2023 was the 63rd edition of Unduk Ngadau pageant which was held on 31 May 2023 at Hongkod Koisaan, Penampang, Sabah, Malaysia. Frenerietta Sobitun of Sandakan crowned her successor, Carol Abbey Gail Geimaldi of Papar, at the end of the event.

== Background ==
The state of Sarawak debut in the pageant for the first time.

== Results ==
Placement	Contestant
Unduk Ngadau 2023	Papar – Carol Abbey Gail Grimaldi
1st Runner-up	Kota Marudu – Calby Floresa Dolinting
2nd Runner-up	Tambunan – Clerice Olvia Augustine
3rd Runner-up	Penampang – Galedine Lind Mosuyun
4th Runner-up	Tuaran – Florina Wileh
5th Runner-up	Kiulu – Melni Dihal
6th Runner-up	Tamparuli – Rannysa Rachel Lee
Top 15	Beaufort – Juje Elor; Inanam – Steffi Olga Aidi; Karambunai – Adelyn Tillon; Kota Kinabalu – Donna Deidre anak Philip; Kudat – Abigail Vun Jia Ying; Labuan – Crystal Vanessa John; Ranau – Fiumie Chang Yee Ann; Tongod – Anika Isty Norman

=== Special awards ===
Major awards	Contestant
Basaan Tinandai Togingo (Best in Evening Dress)	Kota Marudu – Calby Floresa Dolinting
Tati Tosuau (Miss Congeniality)	Likas – Devegrayc Justin
Tati Topiodo (Miss Natural Beauty)	Karambunai – Adelyn Tillon
Subsidiary awards	Contestant
Tati Toonong	Likas – Devegrayc Justin
Miss Bold Pepsi	Nabawan – Abby Suehaiveey
Miss Popular Gogo OPPO	Pitas – Efa Anniesyah Kambang
Miss Culture, Agritourism and Nature (Miss CAN)	Inanam – Steffi Olga Aidi

== Contestants ==
50 contestants competed for the title.

No.	District	Contestant	Placement
01	Klang Valley	Myra Evanna Robert	
02	Labuan	Crystal Vanessa John	Top 15
03	Malacca	Christine Joan Charles	
04	Ranau	Fiumie Chang Yee Ann	Top 15
05	Kinabatangan	Chellyana Tensu	
06	Kemabong	Clerriennikka Sapudin	
07	Kuala Penyu	Alvy Marcellah Guanli	
08	Kunak	Easter Kelly John Aloysius	
09	Pagalungan	Eryeka Cenna Francis	
10	Matunggong	Pui Xue Ni	
11	Kota Marudu	Calby Floresa Dolinting	1st Runner-up
12	Tuaran	Florina Wileh	4th Runner-up
13	Lahad Datu	Jodhrina Birig	
14	Sipitang	Valessaschiffer Jp Francis	
15	Penang	Eva Sandra Duin	
16	Inanam	Steffi Olga Aidi	Top 15
17	Karambunai	Adelyn A. Tillon	Top 15
18	Keningau	Dealinah Alcy	
19	Membakut	Suzziereen Helly Guan Poh	
20	Tongod	Anika Isty Norman	Top 15
21	Kota Kinabalu	Donna Deidre anak Philip	Top 15
22	Sook	Evyanarey Larry	
23	Perak	Celarin Jenny	
24	Telupid	Doren Olivia Gilbert	
25	Paitan	Safikah Duing	
26	Tawau	Angelina Ka	
27	Beluran	Suezilla Ovenna	
28	Banggi	Christine Ferra Jobiril	
29	Johor	Viru Nikah Terinisip	
30	Libaran	Andrea Roulind	
31	Papar	Carol Abbey Gail Grimaldi	Winner
32	Likas	Devegrayc Justin	
33	Menumbok	Maira Christabelle Yapp	
34	Sandakan	Audrie Jialin Tubong	
35	Kudat	Abigail Vun Jia Ying	Top 15
36	Sarawak	Marylyn Velarie Bolovin	
37	Tungku	Jaqualine Sadan	
38	Putrajaya	Marcerine Marcus	
39	Penampang	Galedine Lind Mosuyun	3rd Runner-up
40	Semporna	Frecillavian Sobitun	
41	Tenom	Chrizsha Delyn Ng	
42	Kota Belud	Rachel Aswena Gundang	
43	Kiulu	Melni Dihal	5th Runner-up
44	Putatan	Doreen Tony	
45	Beaufort	Juje Elor	Top 15
46	Tambunan	Clerice Olvia Augustine	2nd Runner-up
47	Kalabakan	Florienza Lin	
48	Pitas	Efa Anniesyah Kambang	
49	Tamparuli	Rannysa Rachael Lee	6th Runner-up
50	Nabawan	Abby Suehaiveey	
