= Unduk Ngadau 2022 =

2022 beauty pageant in Malaysia

- Date: 31 May 2022
- Presenters: May Salitah; Denis Primus
- Entertainment: Elica Paujin; Janrywine J. Lusin
- Venue: Hongkod Koisaan Hall, Kadazandusun Cultural Association, Penampang, Sabah
- Broadcaster: Kaamatan TV and TV Sabah
- Entrants: 44
- Placements: 15
- Winner: Frenerietta Sobitun; Sandakan
- Congeniality: Anya Kimberly; Paitan
- Natural Beauty: Sylvernie Engelbert; Inanam
- Best Evening Dress: Carolyn Tony; Penampang

Unduk Ngadau 2022 was the 62nd edition of the Unduk Ngadau pageant. The pageant was held on 31 May 2022 at Hongkod Koisaan Hall, Kadazandusun Cultural Association, Penampang, Sabah. This year, Kaamatan was held extravagantly after a couple of years facing the COVID-19 pandemic. Frenerietta Sobitun of Sandakan was crowned by the outgoing titleholder, Maya Hejnowska of Api-Api, at the end of the event.

== Results ==
Placement	Contestant
Unduk Ngadau 2022	Sandakan – Frenerietta Sobitun
1st Runner–Up	Papar – Esther Marius
2nd Runner–Up	Ranau – Deedee Cassandra Dallius
3rd Runner–Up	Penampang – Carolyn Tony
4th Runner–Up	Kiulu – Allveanna Loimin
5th Runner–Up	Kota Marudu – Evanatie Sanie
6th Runner–Up	Inanam – Sylvernie Engelbert
Top 15	Keningau – Jeneka Nesious; Kota Kinabalu – Christine Charles; Kudat – Sherone Wong; Likas – Olsheann Jaunopoh; Nabawan – Elisa Markus; Paitan – Anya Kimberly Kow; Tenom – Mardina Baru; Tuaran – Betsy La Salle

=== Special awards ===
Awards	Contestant
Basaan Tinandai Togingo (Best in Evening Dress)	Penampang – Carolyn Tony
Tati Tosuau (Miss Congeniality)	Paitan – Anya Kimberly Kow
Tati Topiodo (Miss Natural Beauty)	Inanam – Sylvernie Engelbert

== Contestants ==
No.	District	Contestant	Placement
01	Putatan	Finafayena Primus	
02	Keningau	Jeneka Nesious	Top 15
03	Sandakan	Freneritta Sobitun	Unduk Ngadau 2022
04	Kota Marudu	Evanatie Sannie	5th Runner-Up
05	Sipitang	Fillonie Francis Debully	
06	Pitas	Nelmui Muhari	
07	Likas	Olsheann Jaunopoh	Top 15
08	Pagalungan	Melvevia Keven	
09	Tambunan	Delvia Rachel Damianus	
10	Kuala Penyu	Hemeliza Lasayung	
11	Johor	Estessie Blase Martin	
12	Kota Kinabalu	Christine Joan Charles	Top 15
13	Paitan	Anya Kimberly Kow	Top 15
14	Tawau	Rachael Saidi	
15	Tamparuli	Crisnila Katy Jupli	
16	Semporna	Annatasha Alex	
17	Papar	Esther Marius	1st Runner-Up
18	Lahad Datu	Chelsie Madeline Henry	
19	Telupid	Elvera Petrus	
20	Kiulu	Allveanna Loimin	4th Runner-Up
21	Sook	Helviyanna Nasip	
22	Ranau	Deedee Cassandra Dallius	2nd Runner-Up
23	Matunggong	Lefiah Jilan	
24	Nabawan	Elisa Denssy Marcus	Top 15
25	Tenom	Mardina Baru	Top 15
26	Tungku	Rynnora Ronnie Chang	
27	Kota Belud	Fiurine Minsin	
28	Kalabakan	Flores Cuthbert	
29	Karambunai	Gillian Gwyneth Henry	
30	Kemabong	Richael Claudia Rabinus	
31	Tuaran	Betsy La Salle	Top 15
32	Klang Valley	Grace Angel George	
33	Kudat	Sherone Wong Wan Fung	Top 15
34	Beluran	Jelsi Jass Ellyvera James	
35	Inanam	Sylvernie Belinda Engelbert	6th Runner-Up
36	Beaufort	Alica Albert	
37	Tongod	Elayne Ordeelia Marius	
38	Putrajaya	Clarince Dumpong	
39	Malacca	Lisa Ng Pei Sia	
40	Kunak	Elisheeba Gloria Herbert	
41	Membakut	Natalie Ally Hepeni	
42	Penampang	Carolyn Tony	3rd Runner-Up
43	Menumbok	Sherly Suzie	
44	Kinabatangan	Becky Albert	
