= Unduk Ngadau =

Malaysian beauty pageant

Unduk Ngadau Kaamatan

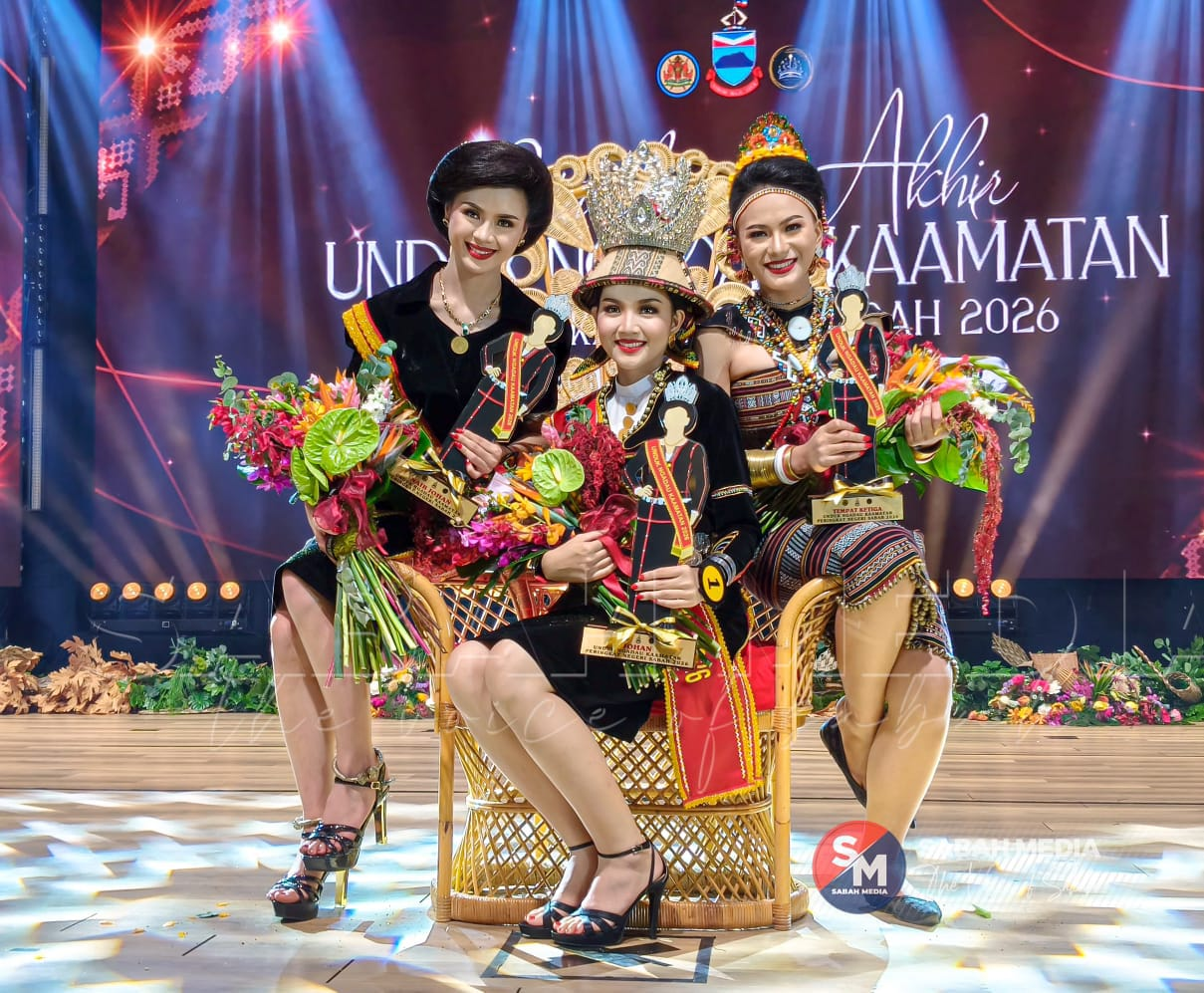
- The crowning of the next Unduk Ngadau held annually at the Hongkod Koisaan Hall in Penampang District to mark the end of the Kaamatan festival
- Type: Kadazan-Dusun-Murut-Rungus (KDMR) beauty pageant (Note: The annual Unduk Ngadau Kaamatan (originally Miss Kadazan) is a piece of the heritage of the Kadazan-Dusun community and has evolved into a showcase of cultural diversity and heritage in Sabah, promoting unity. The pageant is a platform where participants begin their journey of confidence, knowing not just their culture and tradition, but also their family background and their role as Kadazan-Dusun, Murut and Rungus women.)
- Parent organization: Kadazan Dusun Cultural Association (KDCA)
- Headquarters: Hongkod Koisaan Hall, Penampang District, Sabah, Malaysia
- First edition: 1960 (66 years)
- Most recent edition: 2026
- Current titleholder: Gelvia Vanessa Jenny; Papar
- Chairwoman: Joanna Kitingan; Dr. Mary Gambidau
- Language: Kadazan-Dusun (official); Murut; Rungus; Malay; English
- Website: kdca.org.my

Unduk Ngadau, or Unduk Ngadau Kaamatan, is a beauty pageant held annually during the Kaamatan cultural event in Sabah, Malaysia. The pageant competition is originally held between different districts in Sabah (district level) and have since been expanded between different states and federal territories (national level) of Malaysia. Currently, the pageant is contested between sumandak or bazad-bazad (Kadazan-Dusun), ralaa (Murut) and sumuni (Rungus) from the participating Sabah districts and territories as well as Kadazan Dusun Cultural Association (KDCA) branches outside Sabah who have been registered.

It has been around for 66 years since its first inception in 1960, with Penampang District becoming the leading titleholder with the most titles, 24, followed by Papar District with seventh, Tanjung Aru and Inanam five respectively, Tuaran District four, and Kota Kinabalu City and Tamparuli three respectively. The participants usually either have parentage fully of Kadazan-Dusun-Murut-Rungus (KDMR) descent or partially, and the participants' fluency in the ancestral language, along with knowledgeability, has been a major requirement in recent editions.

The reigning Unduk Ngadau is Gelvia Vanessa Jenny of Papar who was crowned by the 2025 Unduk Ngadau, Atitih Yati Robert of Tamparuli, on 31 May 2026 at the Hongkod Koisaan Hall in Penampang, Sabah.

== Etymology ==
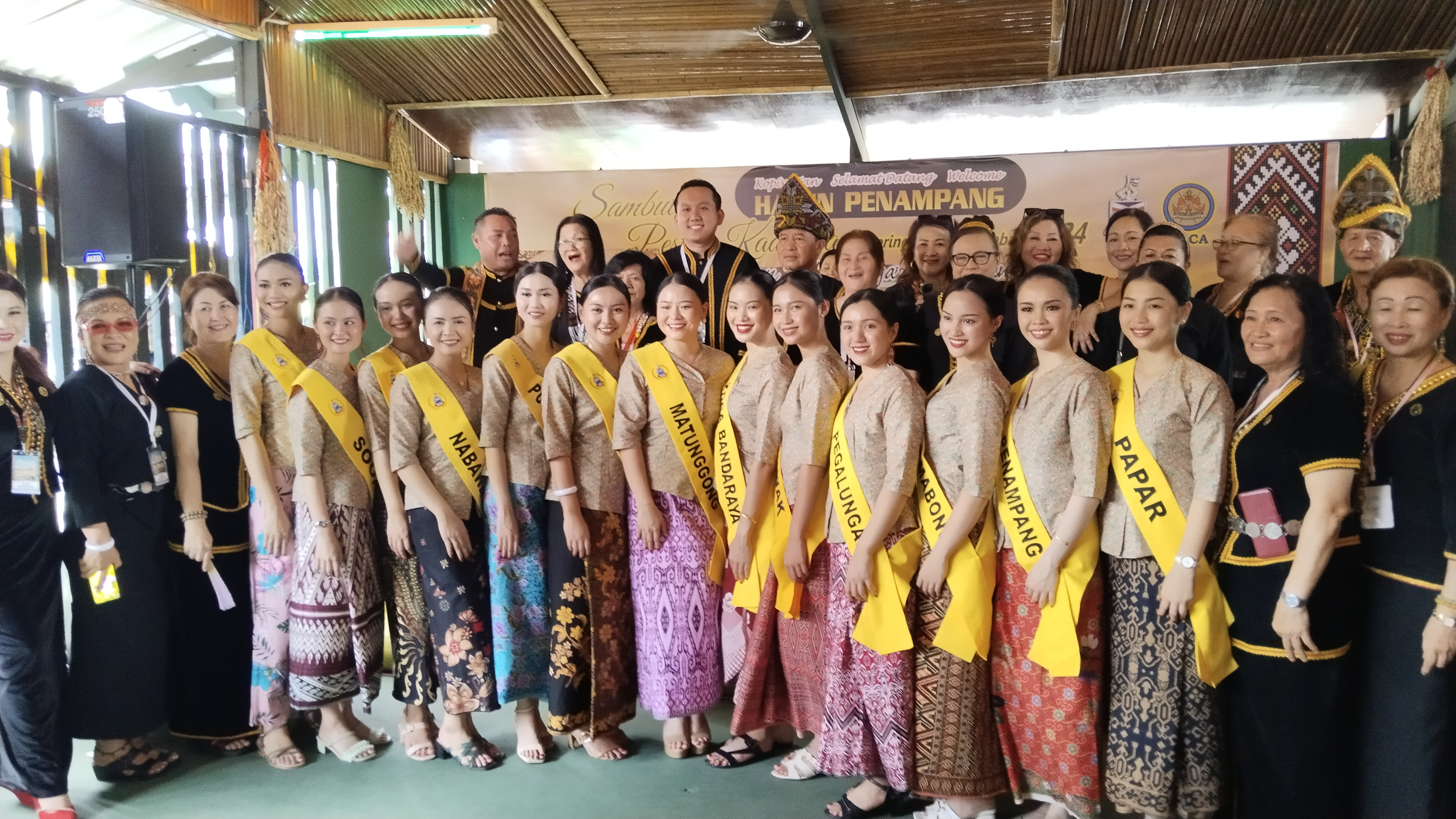
A group of Unduk Ngadau finalists donning traditional kebaya and Malaysian batik sarong in 2024

From its first inception in 1960, the beauty pageant was named Miss Kadazan (1960–1970), Miss Harvest Festival (1971–1980), Ratu Kaamatan or Ratu Pesta Menuai (1981–1990) and the current Unduk Ngadau (1991–present). The word unduk means "to emerge and to spring out", like a new plant sprouting out from the ground, while the word tadau means the sun. Thus, Unduk Ngadau means "the emerging sun". The current title is also said to derive from the Dusun phrase runduk tadau which means "the woman crowned by the sunlight". The current term "Unduk Ngadau" along with "Kaamatan" have been registered since the 2010s with the Intellectual Property Corporation of Malaysia (MyIPO), the country registrar of trademarks to protect the cultural beauty pageant from misuse by other organisations that have no connection to the official source.

=== Cultural background ===
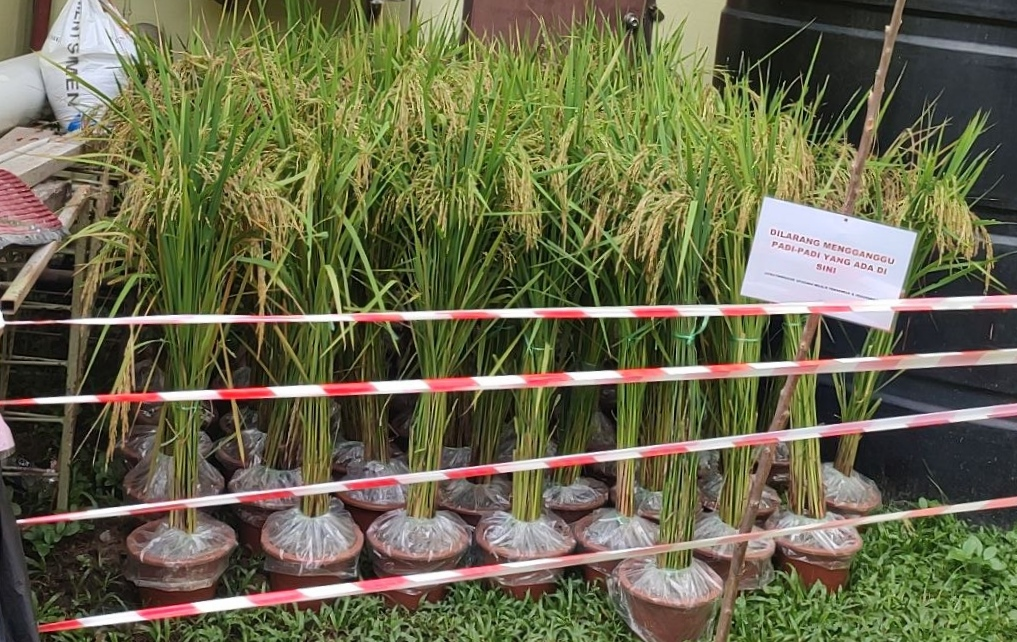
Huminodun is revered as the maiden who sacrificed herself to save her people from famine, and her spirit is believed to reside within the paddy, often referred to as Bambarayon (paddy spirit). The Unduk Ngadau beauty pageant is held to commemorate her.

The Unduk Ngadau beauty pageant is held to commemorate the spirit of Huminodun, the mythological maiden who was an embodiment of beauty through her mind and soul. Her willingness to sacrifice herself for her people from a famine symbolises loyalty, willingness and sacrifice, which are deemed several of the essential qualities each Unduk Ngadau winner must possess. The cultural event subsequently empowers women, giving them the confidence to speak about their culture, heritage and life in their indigenous languages, while, at the same time, showcasing the heritage and culture of their ethnic groups to the broader society nationwide and the world. Unduk Ngadau is one of the most recognisable cultural events in Sabah and is unique to the state. The state-level beauty pageant is the highlight and ending point of the month-long Kaamatan celebration.

== History ==
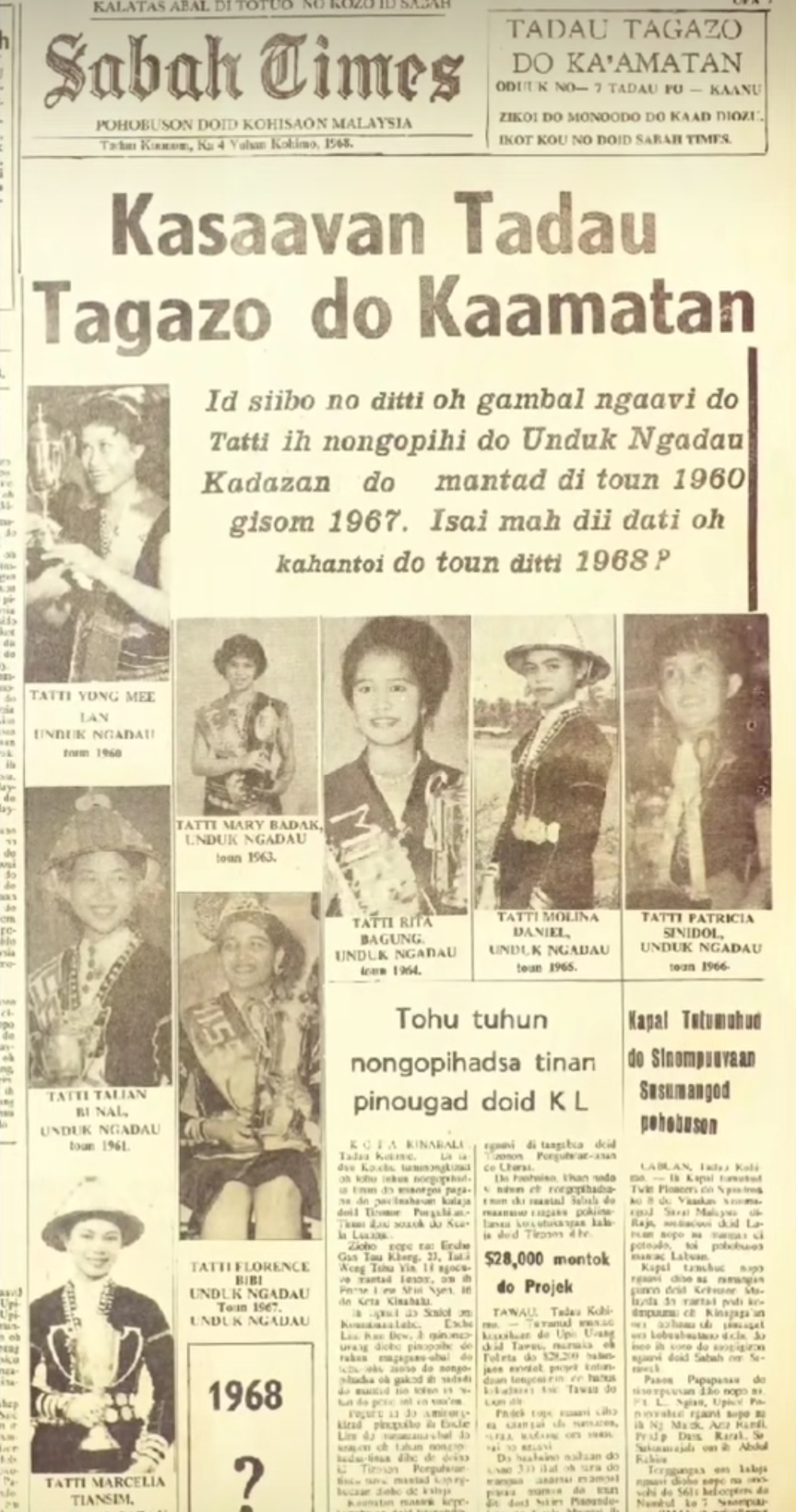
A 1968 front-page clipping from the Kadazan-language daily Sabah Times, featuring Unduk Ngadau (Miss Kadazan) winners from 1960 to 1967

The first beauty pageant ever was held in 1958, known as Jesselton Rural Beauty Queen, and the contestants of the beauty pageant generally represented their localities. The success of analogous regional beauty pageants across Sabah in 1959 proved to cultural leaders and the colonial administration that there was immense demand for a unified celebration.

Following the approval and subsequent gazettement of the Kaamatan celebration as an official public holiday in the region on 9 May 1960 as proposed by the Paramount Chief of the Interior OKK Sedomon Gunsanad Kina (Note: The title "OKK" is strictly reserved for the District Chiefs of Sabah. Sedomon succeeded his father, OKK Gunsanad Kina, as District Chief of Keningau. He also inherited the unofficial title, "Paramount Chief of the Interior", which was previously held by his father.) during the Conference of the District Chiefs and Native Chiefs of North Borneo in 1956, (Note: During the Conference of the District Chiefs and Native Chiefs of North Borneo in 1956 OKK Sedomon Gunsanad Kina, proposed for the Kaamatan celebration to be gazetted as an official public holiday in North Borneo. His request was agreed upon during the conference and officially gazetted by the British colonial authorities on 9 May 1960, about four years since the proposal was made during a meeting with British colonial officials.) state-level Miss Kadazan was held in the same year, in 1960, and women of Kadazan-Dusun descent vied for the title of Unduk Ngadau.

The first winner of Miss Kadazan, or Unduk Ngadau, was a Sino-Native named Yong Mee Lan from Penampang District. Since her crowning, more than 20 representatives from the same district have won the title, resulting in Penampang District holding the most titles to date. Papar District comes in second, with winners such as Talian Bunal in 1961, Marcella Tiansim in 1962, Molina Daniel in 1965, Florence Bibi in 1967 and more in the 2000s and 2010s. In 2026, another pageant participant from Papar, Gelvia Vanessa Jenny, was crowned the Unduk Ngadau. Papar District is followed by Tanjung Aru, with Mary Solly in 1979, Joan Gloria Tommy in 1987, Julia Augustine in 1990, Crystel Eve Huminodun in 2010 and Ryannie Neils Yong in 2015. Coming in fourth is Inanam, with Luzie Tham in 1993, Jeremiah Ginajil in 1998, Kathie Renjus in 1999, Hosiani James Jaimis in 2018 and Hyellene Danius in 2024, and both Tanjung Aru and Inanam have won five titles to date. Tuaran District came in fourth, with Rita Bagong in 1964, Roslina Amit in 1980, Sylvia Sandralisa Orow in 1991 and Jo-Anna Sue Henley Rampas in 2007—a half-British representative who is one of the most well-known Unduk Ngadau to date.

Putatan District won their first title with Mary Badak in 1963. Years later, Anita Pudin won in 1992, the win places the district in the sixth place, and coming in seventh is Tamparuli with Mary Jaikoh Imbayan in 1971, Fharelynne Ivonne Henry in 2004 and Atitih Yati Robert in 2025, and also Kota Kinabalu City with three titles in the 2010s, with Immaculate Lojuki in 2013, Cheryl Lynn Pinsius in 2014 and Kerinah Mah in 2017, placing them both in the fifth place.

Miss Kadazan winners (1960–1970)
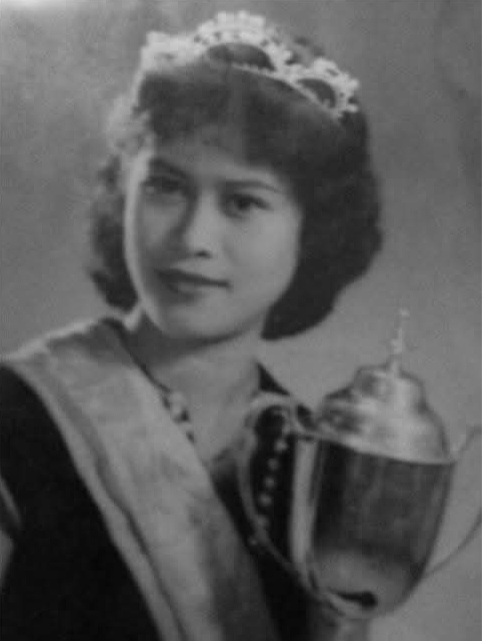
Yong Mee Lan, the winner of the first edition, representing Penampang District (1960)

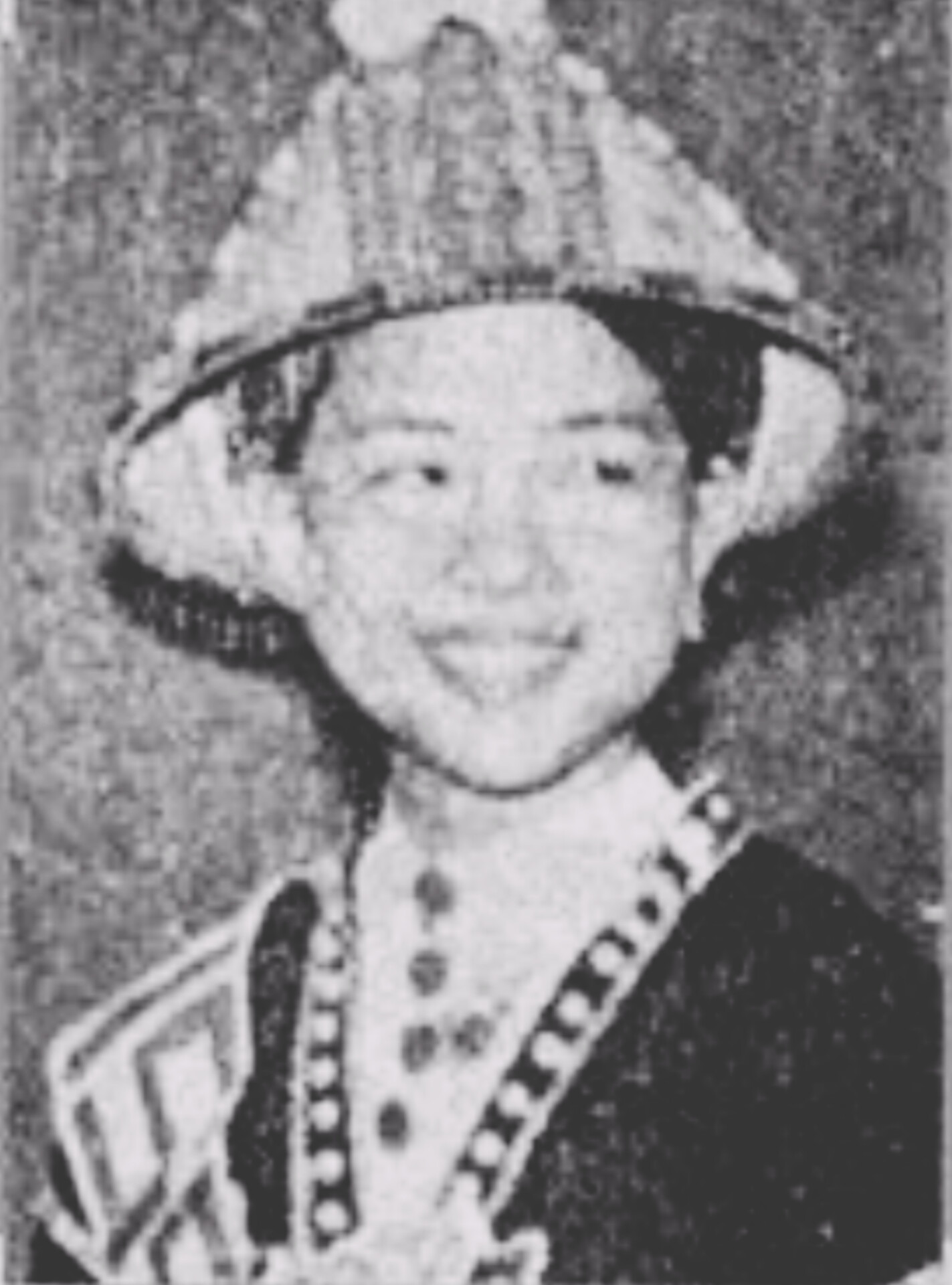
Talian Bunal, the winner of the second edition, representing Papar District (1961)

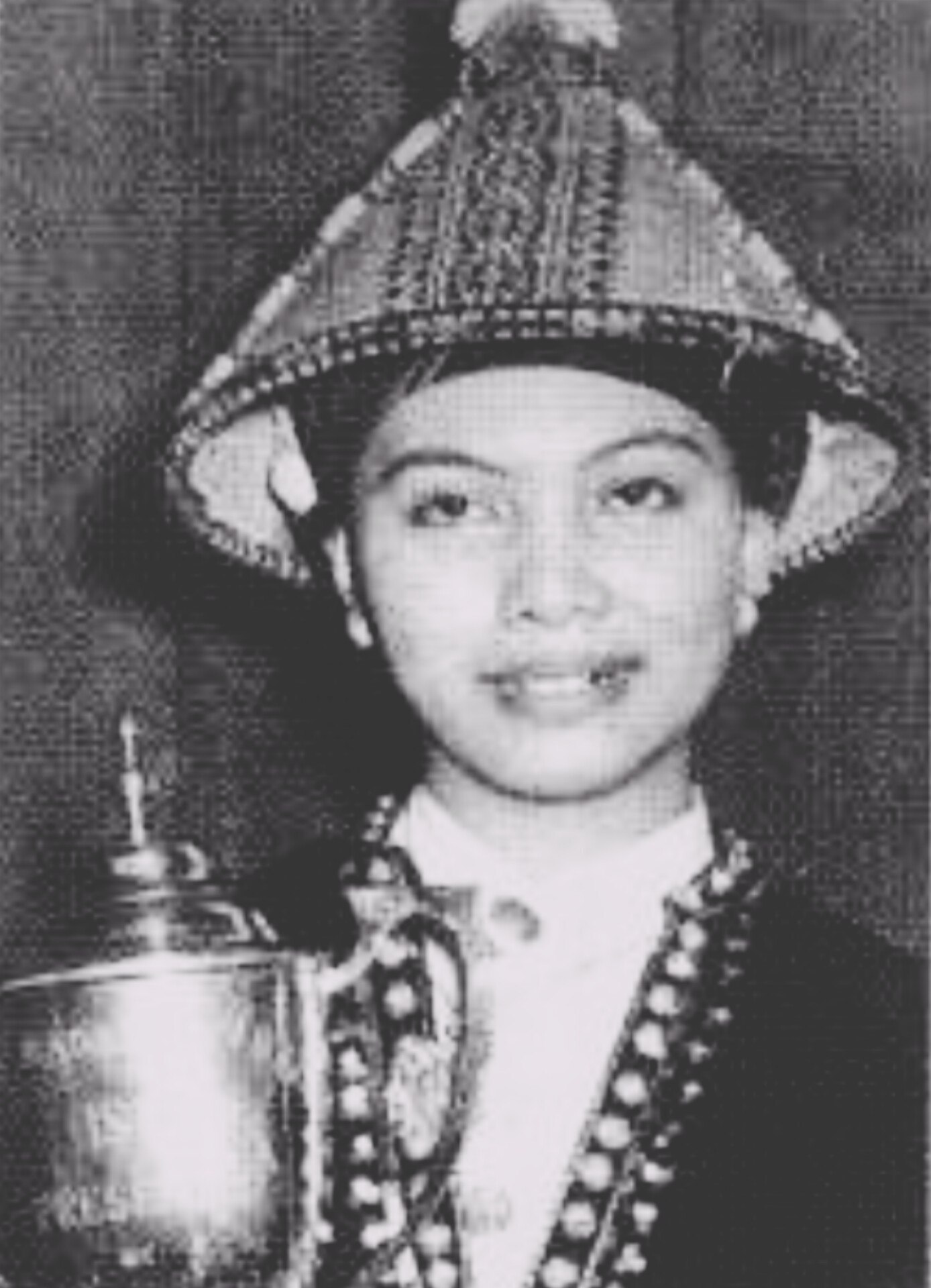
Marcella Tiansim, the winner of the third edition, representing Papar District (1962)

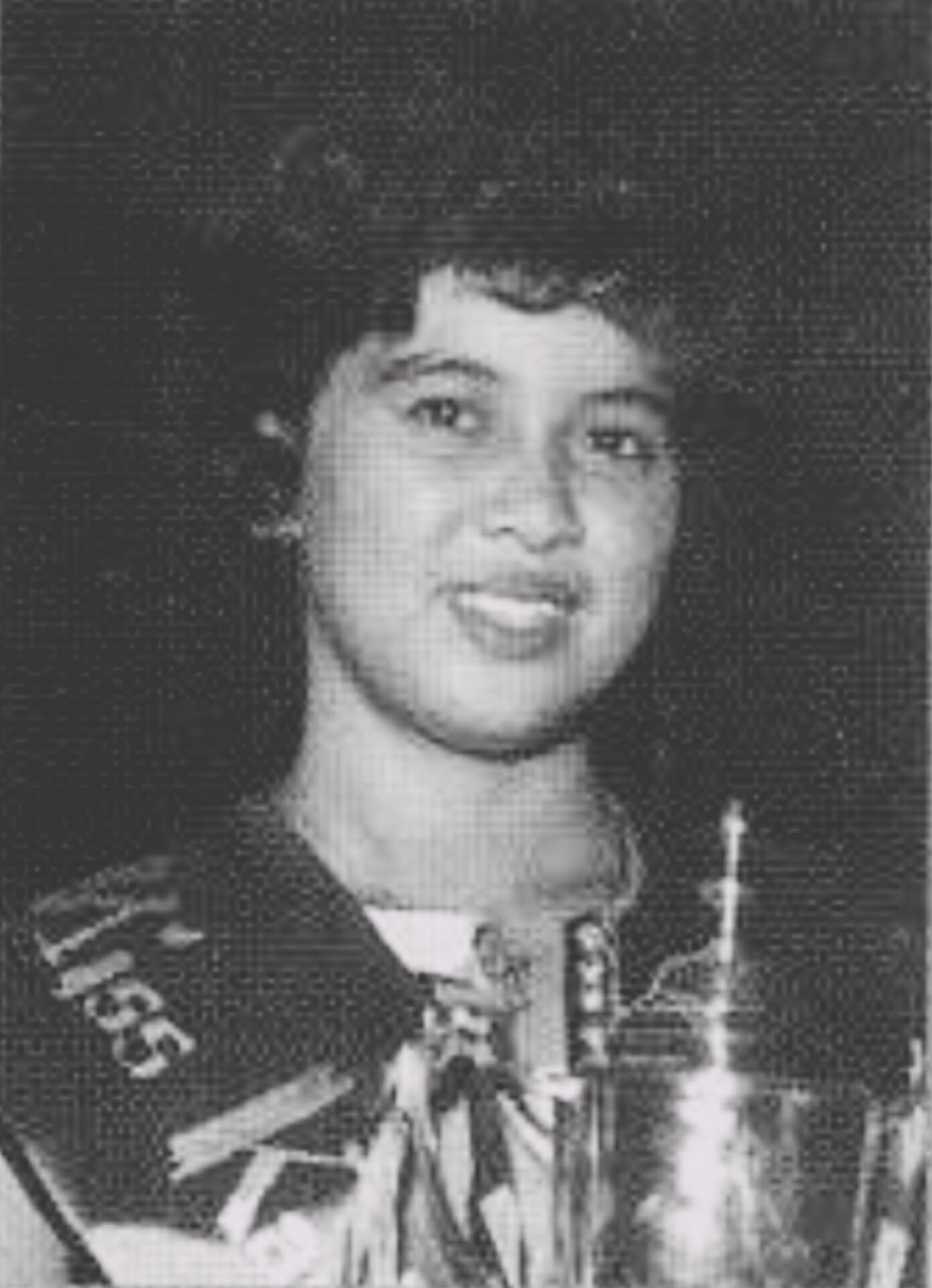
Mary Badak, the winner of the fourth edition, representing Putatan District (1963)

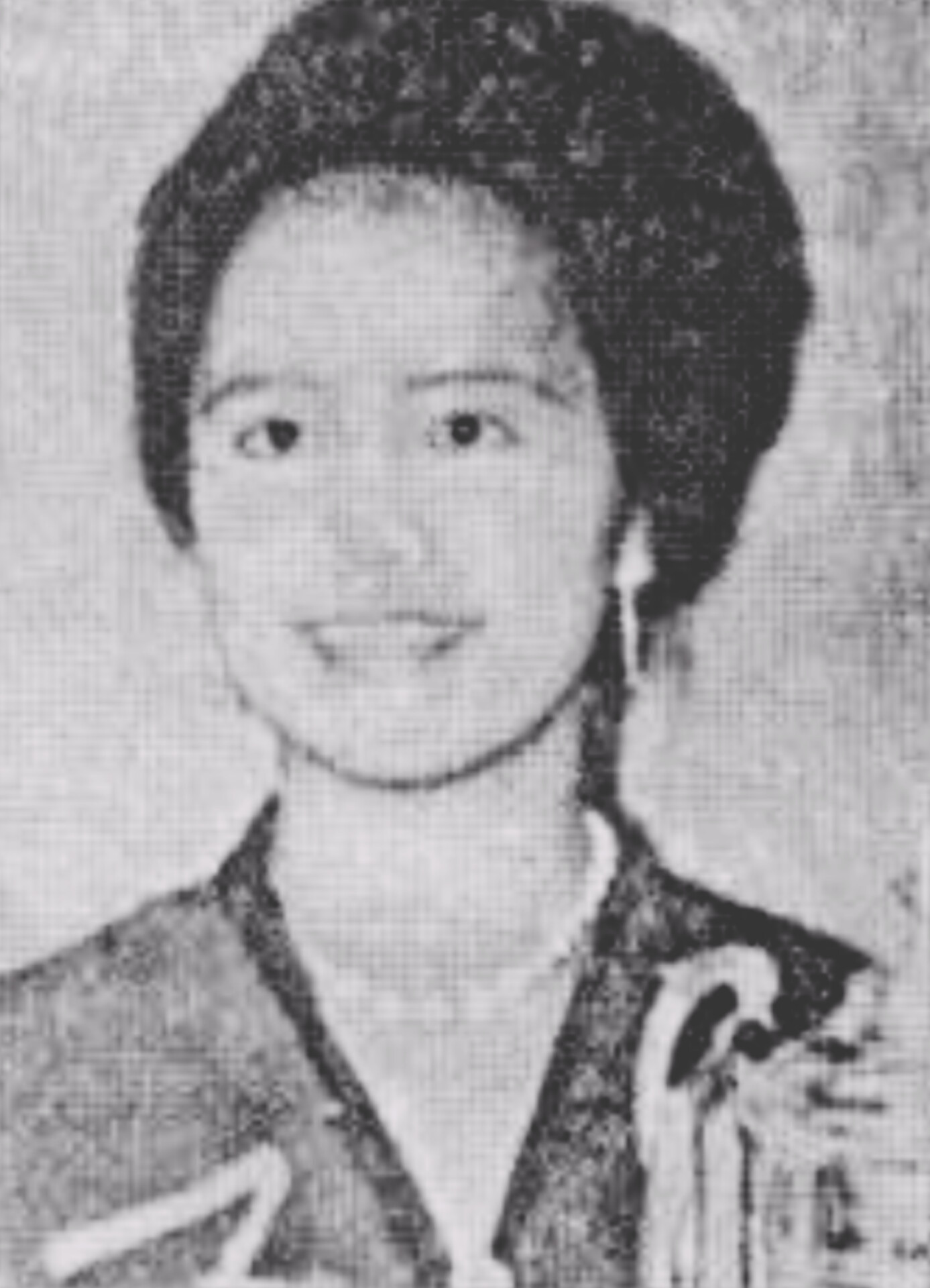
Rita Bagong, the winner of the fifth edition, representing Tuaran District (1964)

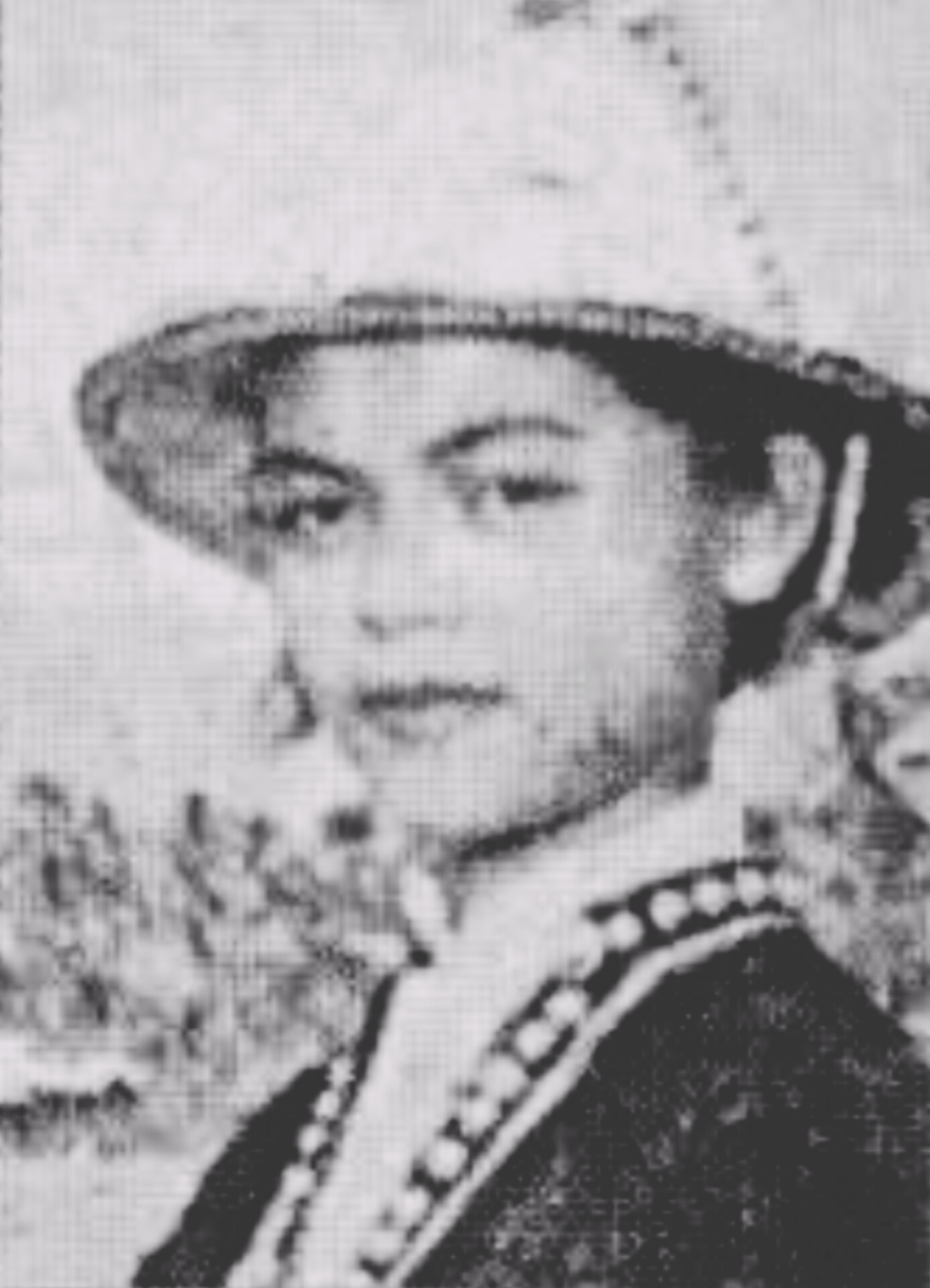
Molina Daniel, the winner of the sixth edition, representing Papar District (1965)

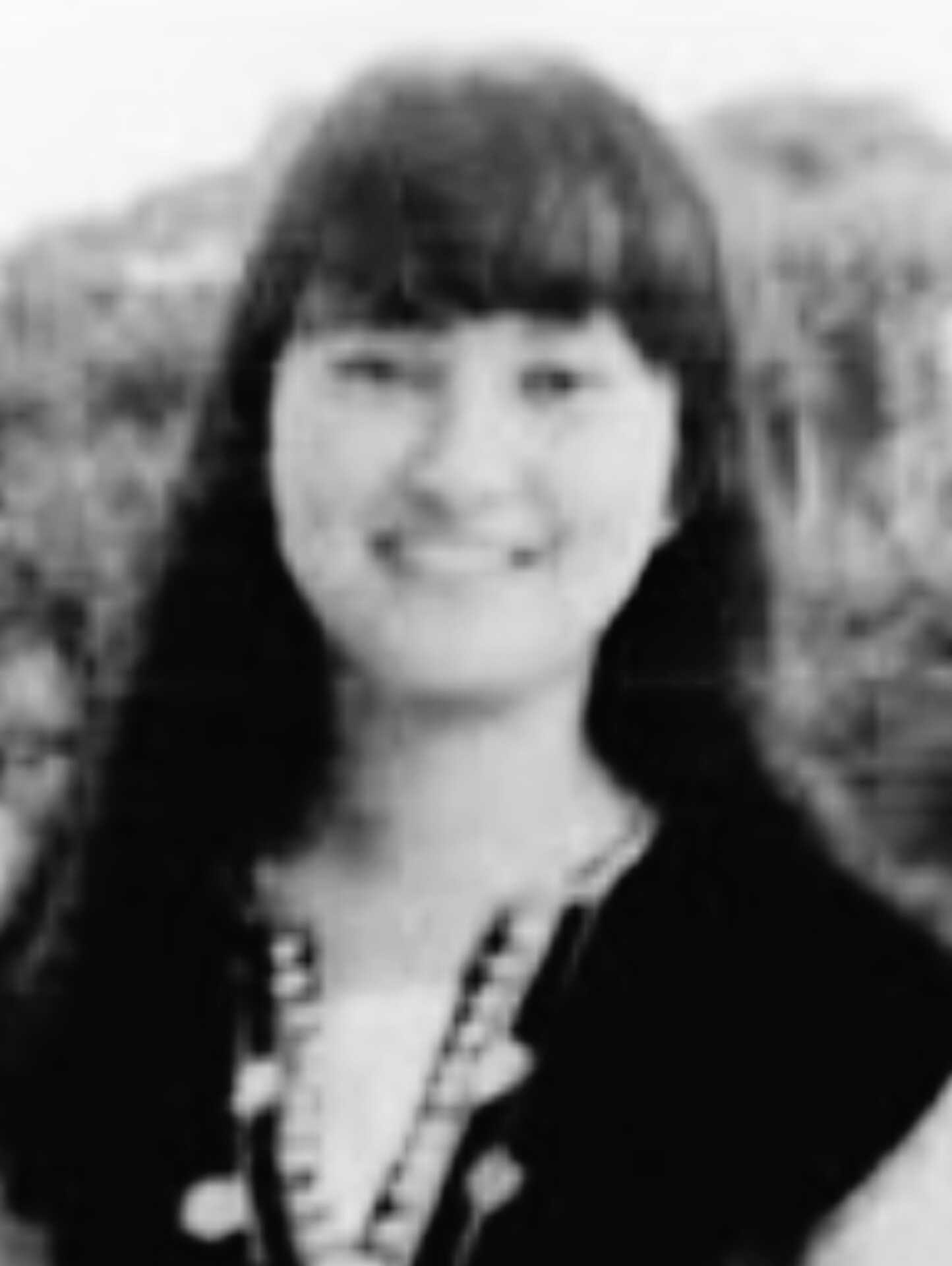
Patricia Sinidol, the winner of the seventh edition, representing Penampang District (1966)

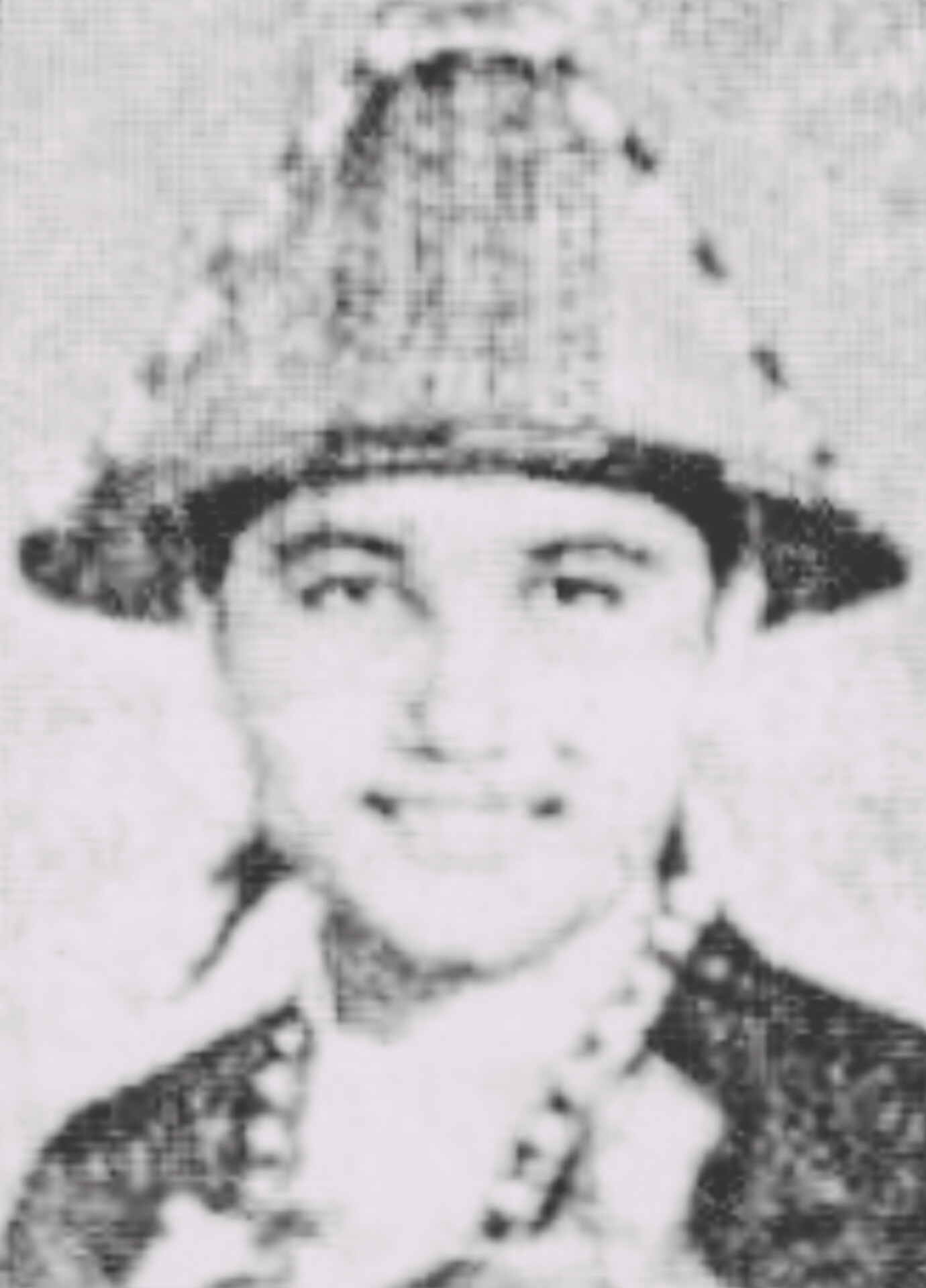
Florence Bibi, the winner of the eighth edition, representing Papar District (1967)

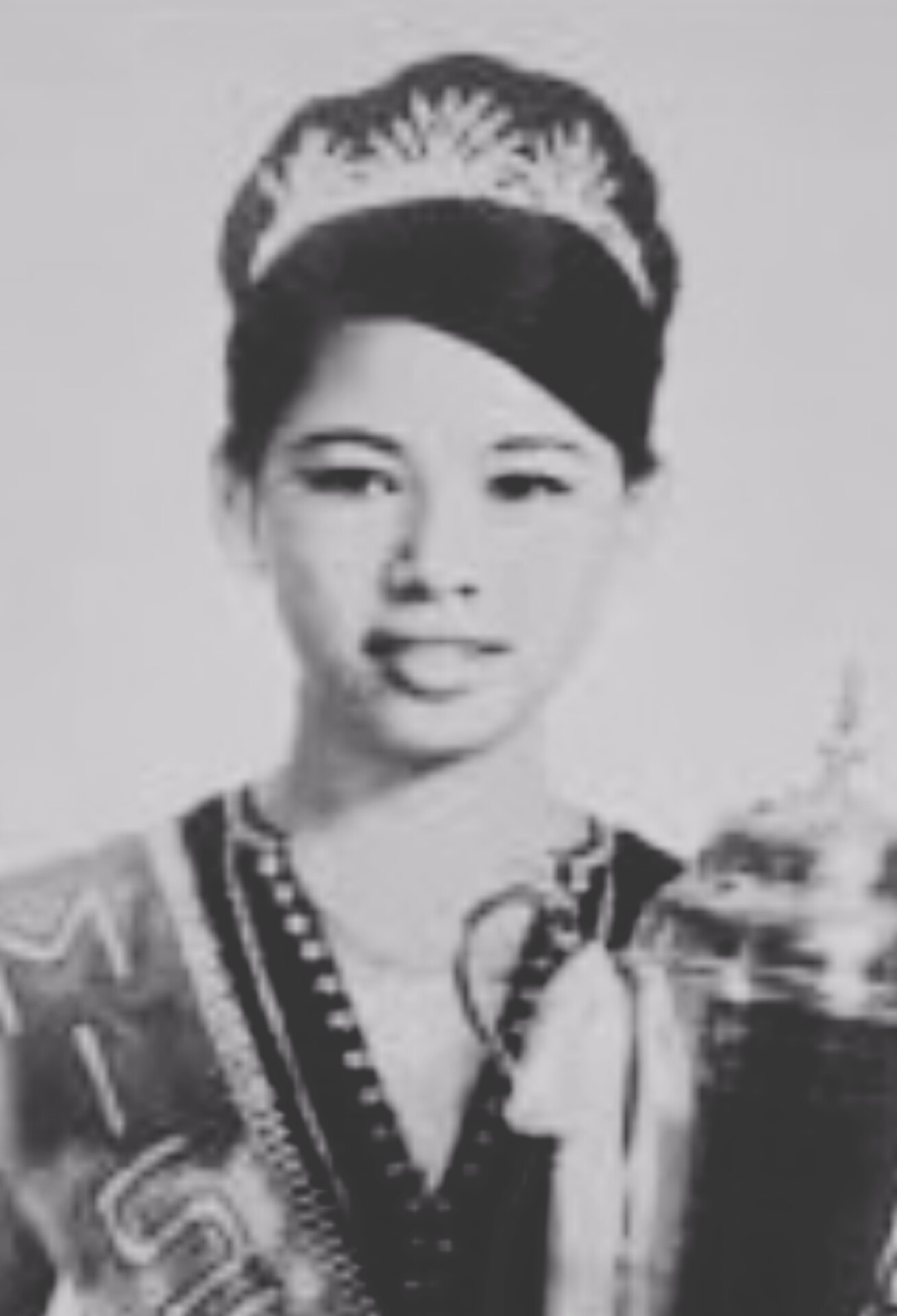
Rita Mojilis, the winner of the ninth edition, representing Penampang District (1968)

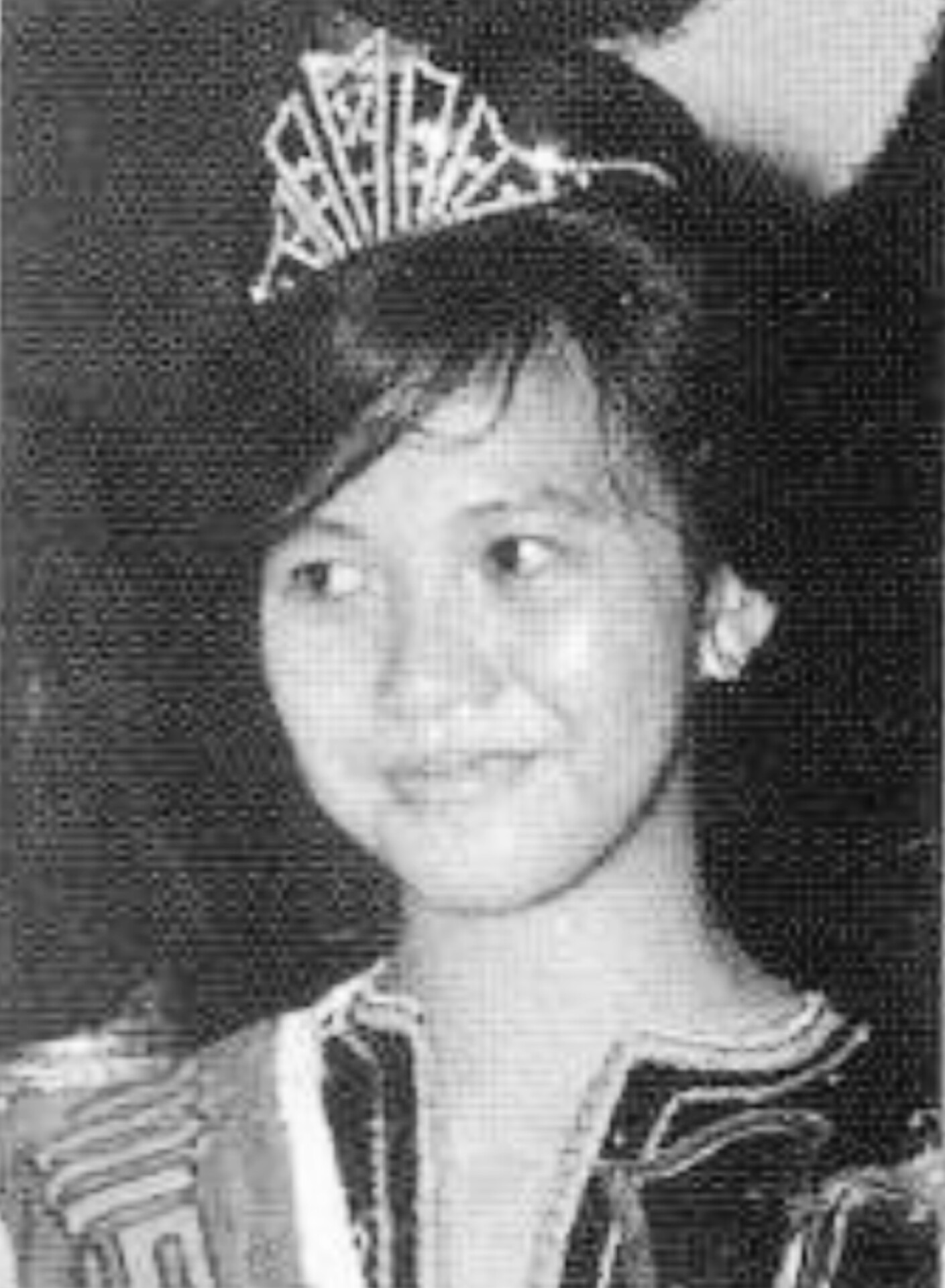
Sylvia Totu, the winner of the 10th edition, representing Penampang District (1969)

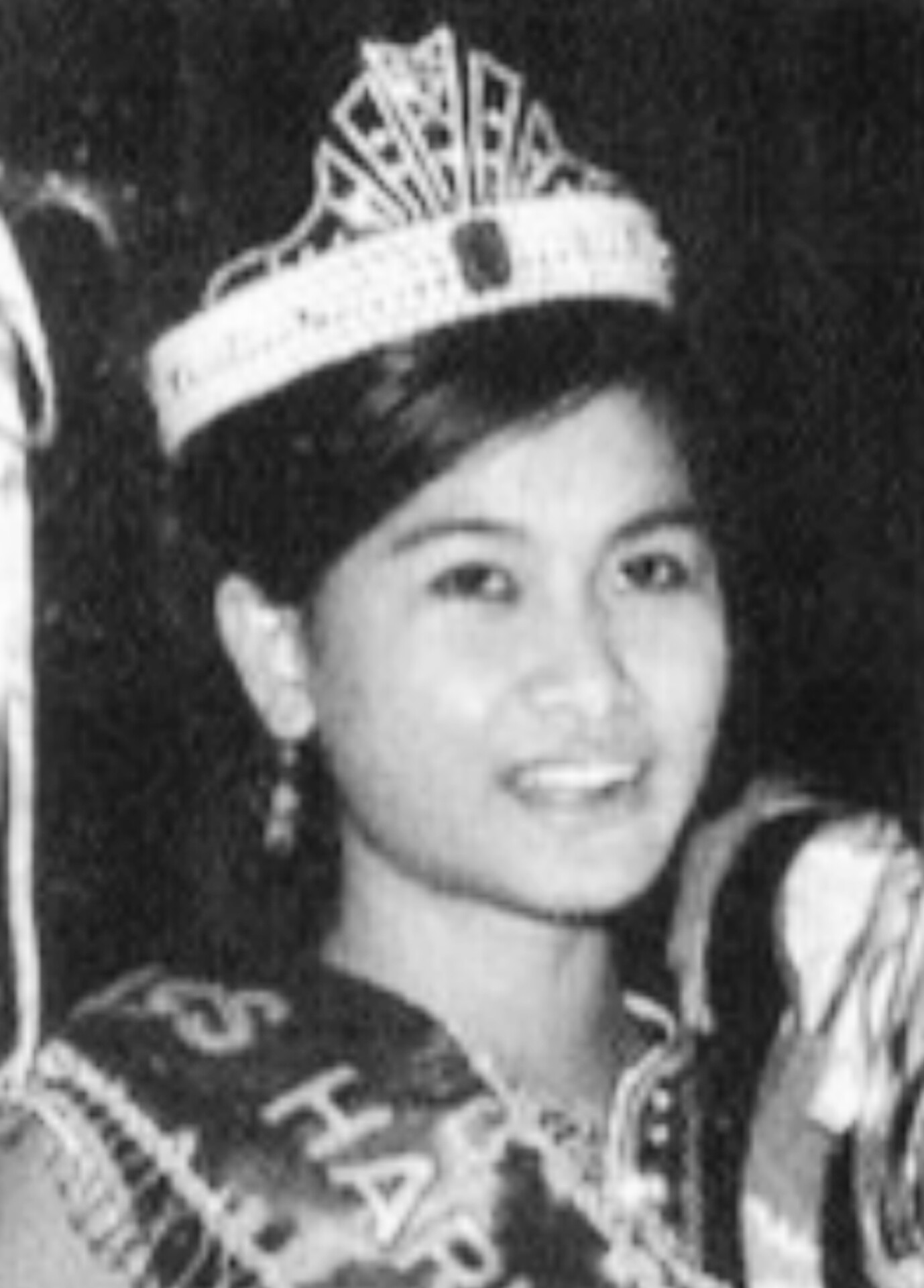
Helen Mojiniu, the winner of the 11th edition, representing Penampang District (1970)

=== 1995: Expansion of eligibility ===
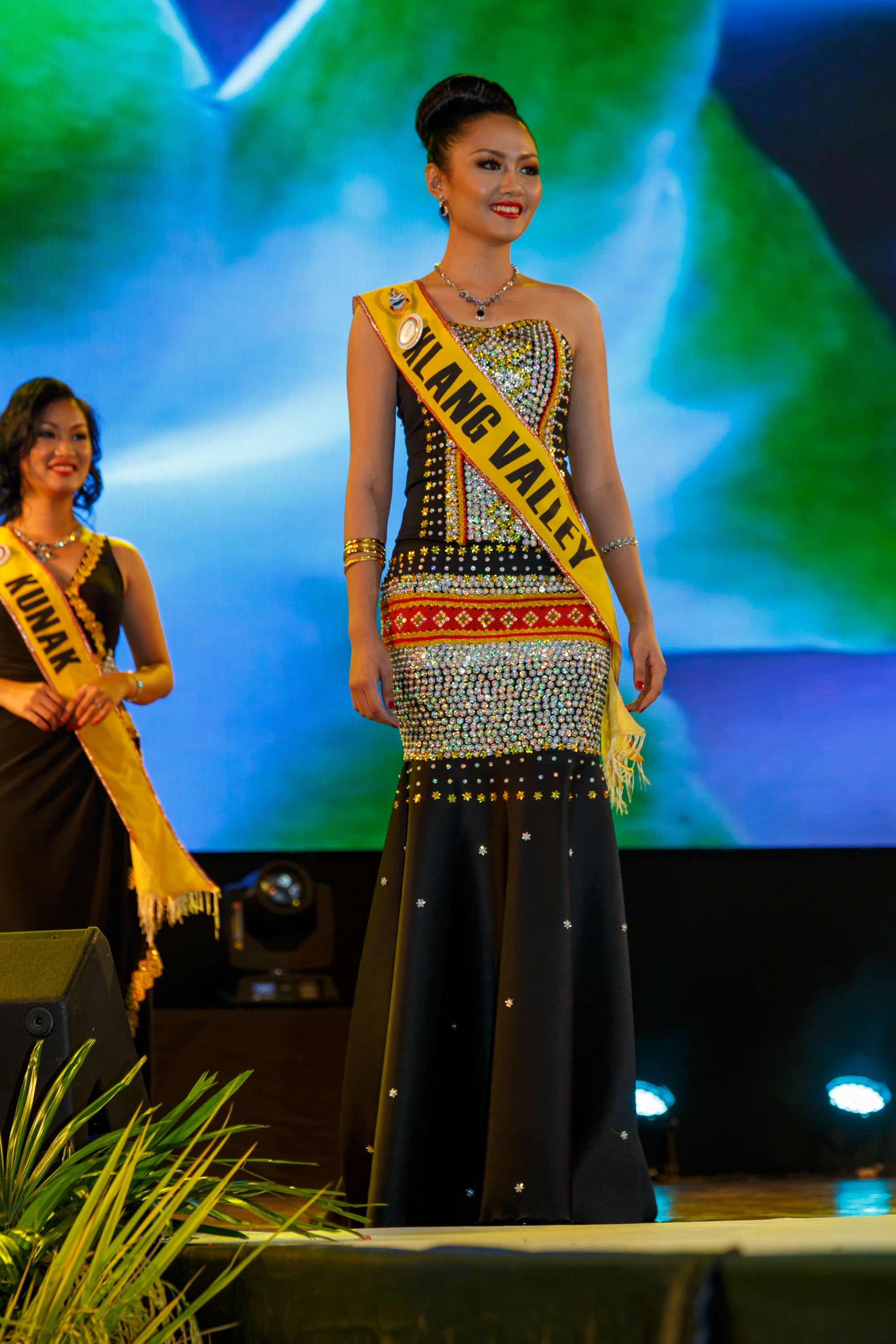
Maylesthelyn Matius, a Top 7 finalist of Unduk Ngadau 2014, representing KDCA Klang Valley

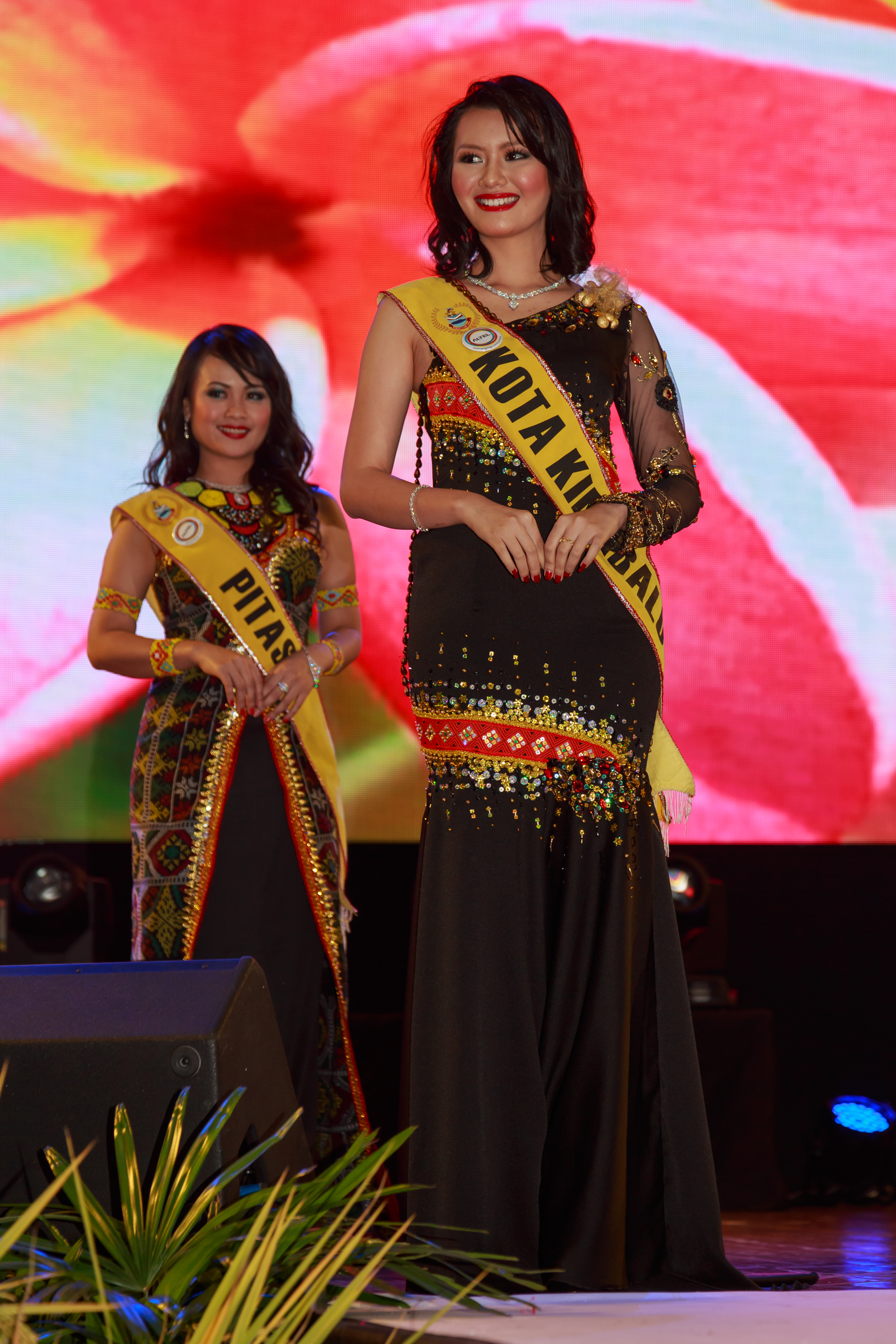
Cheryl Lynn Pinsius, the winner of Unduk Ngadau 2014, representing Kota Kinabalu City

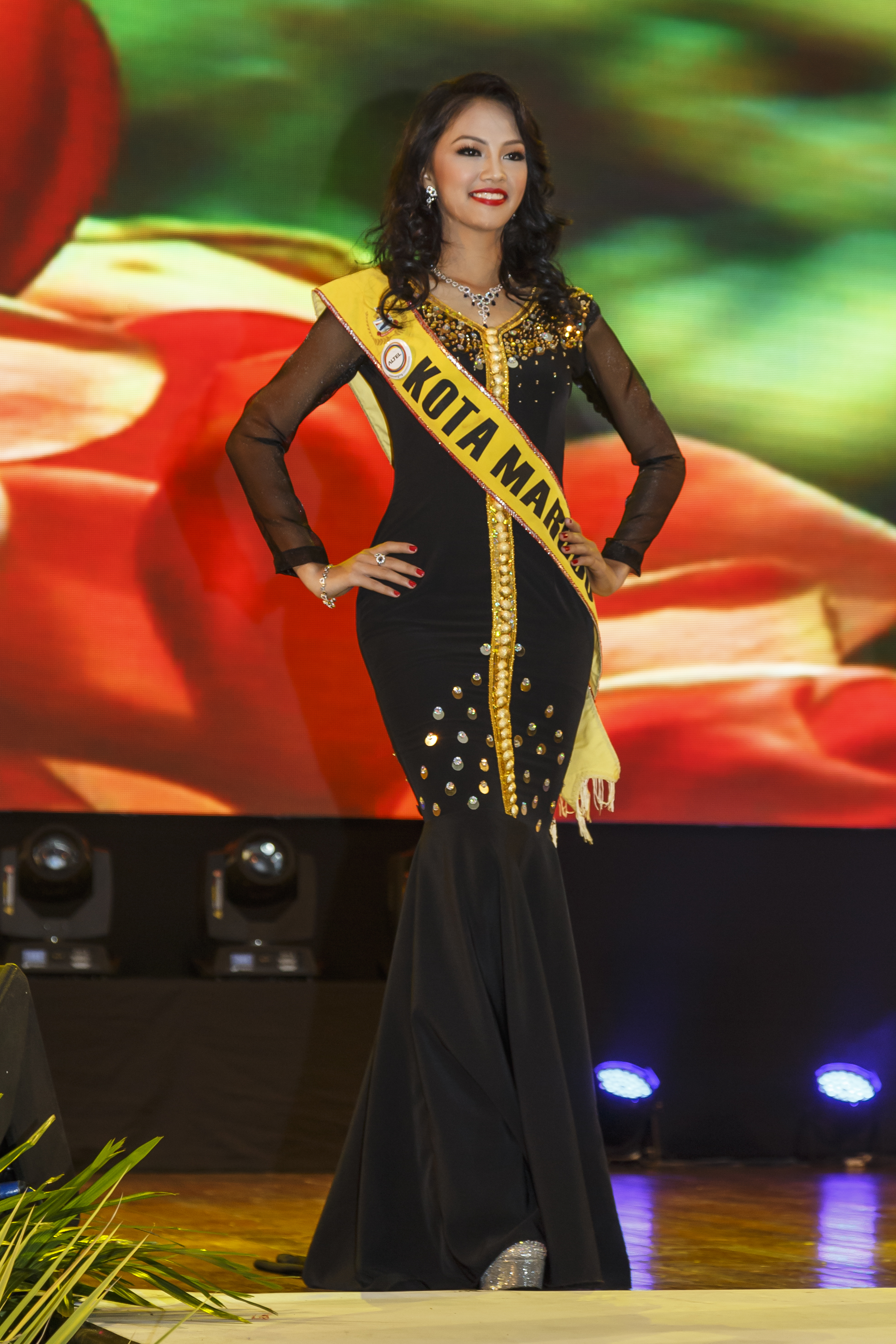
Scarlett Megan Liew, a crowd favourite who finished as the first runner-up in Unduk Ngadau 2014, representing Kota Marudu

Since 1995, the KDCA has recognised KDMR members residing outside Sabah, allowing Unduk Ngadau beauty pageants to be held outside the state and easing contestant logistics. The beauty pageants aim to allow KDMR members outside Sabah to participate regardless of birthplace or background. It encourages them to maintain their indigenous heritage by at least being able to speak their ancestral language. Since then, several states and zones outside Sabah have been sending their delegates to the main pageant. For instance, since 2000, a KDCA branch in Kuala Lumpur has begun holding its own Unduk Ngadau pageant, bestowing the title Klang Valley to the winner. The first ever representative from Klang Valley was Angeline Ongkunik, and Klang Valley first won national-level Unduk Ngadau with Daphne Iking in 2003, just three years after its debut.

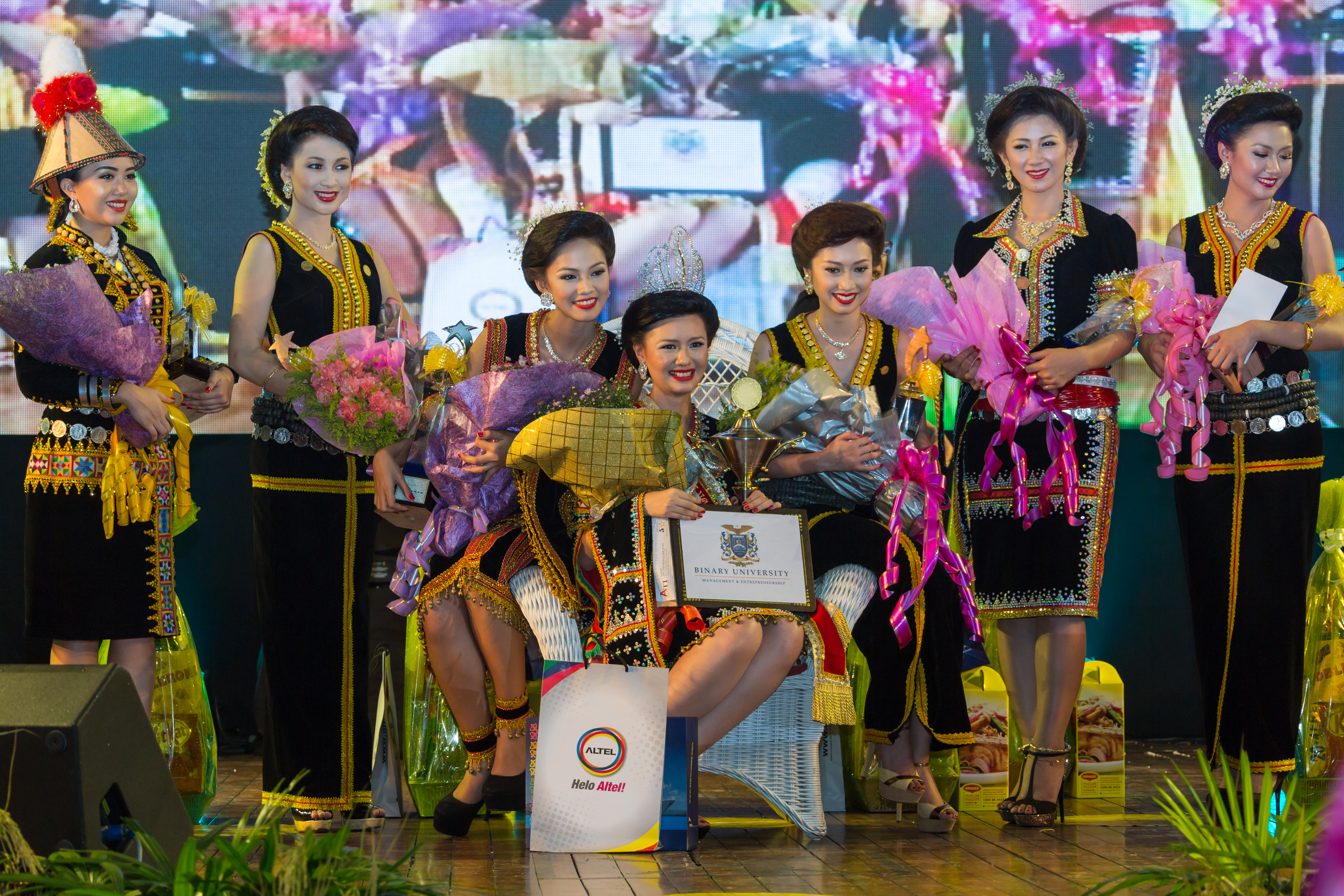
The winner of Unduk Ngadau 2014, Cheryl Lynn Pinsius of Kota Kinabalu City (seated), in a group photo with the Top 7 finalists

In the following year, Janeitha Stephen of Klang Valley placed first runner-up to Tamparuli's Fharelynne Ivonne Henry. Many of the Klang Valley representatives achieved high placements at the national level—the 2001 representative Ryna Rychie James (second runner-up), 2005 Susanna James Kenson (fourth runner-up), 2007 Jaslinder Kaur (sixth runner-up), 2008 Anne Marie Tauriq Khan (sixth runner-up), 2013 Ledesma Steven (fifth runner-up), 2014 Maylesthelyn Ley Matius (sixth runner-up), 2016 Patricia Elsa Jimy (fifth runner-up), 2017 Sharlina Gilbert Mojinun (fifth runner-up) and 2019 Vinnie Alvionitta Sasising (sixth runner-up). Since 2012, a question-and-answer round in the ancestral language has been added to the beauty pageant. Melinda Louis was one of the first to have succeeded in the particular question-and-answer round, and she was crowned Unduk Ngadau 2012.

The Peninsular Malaysian KDCA branch of Johor began sending its delegates in 2014. In the same year, Johor achieved its best to-date achievement with Liz Lorena Rayner, who placed second runner-up at the national level. Others later sent delegates—Penang in 2018, Putrajaya in 2019, and Malacca and Perak in 2021. Starting in the 2019 edition, contestants are required to be knowledgeable about current issues as the winner automatically becomes a cultural and tourism ambassador for Sabah, and each contestant is obligated to produce local culture research books apart from being fluent in their ancestral language. Maya Hejnowska, a Kadazan-Polish contestant, was the first Eurasian to win the pageant in five years in 2021. She succeeded Sherry Anne of Penampang, who won in 2016.

=== 2020s: Further expansions, official recognition as a national competition ===
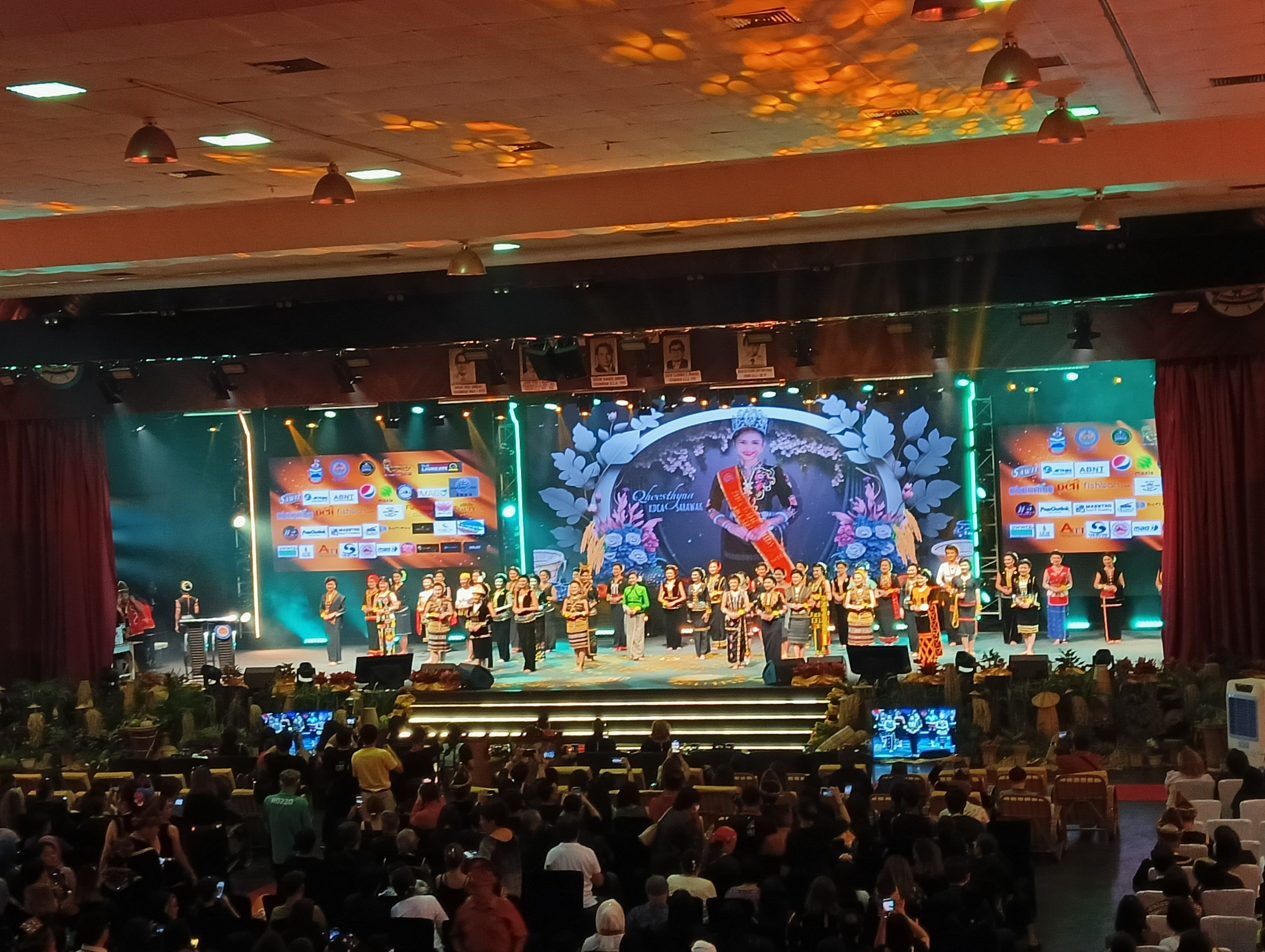
The Unduk Ngadau 2024 Final

In 2021, the paid voting system was introduced to the fans in order for them to vote for their favourite contestants by paying RM0.50 per vote to help them advance to the semifinals. In 2023, the state of Sarawak competed at the national level for the first time, with Marylyn Velarie Bolovin. In 2024, the Unduk Ngadau beauty pageant was officially recognised as a national event in Malaysia. Following the upgrade, every Unduk Ngadau contestant is expected to promote Sabah's culture and heritage and at the same time empowering themselves through skills and confidence. In the 2025 edition, the Miss Popular CAN (Culture, Agrotourism, Nature) Video was awarded to Norasnih Madjalan of Klang Valley as her short film garnered 2,247 likes. The beauty pageant continues to be referred to as a state-level event, rather than a national-level one, since the current provisions of the KDCA constitution are yet to be amended. Unduk Ngadau 2025 saw a major upgrade in its scoring method through the system of e-Unduk (Note: The system is officially named the e-Unduk Digital Judging System and was developed by Ts. Aedeshie Daisy Rayner, a PhD holder, under the e-Unduk Hybrid Judging Framework, which is based on multi-criteria decision analysis (MCDM). The framework combines Simple Additive Weighting (SAW) for initial filtering and weighted-score aggregation with Borda count for final ranking based on judges' consensus. The latest version, e-Unduk v2.8.0, successfully underwent a controlled parallel pilot evaluation during the state-level Unduk Ngadau Kaamatan in May 2026.) developed by local Sabahan IT expert Ts. Aedeshie Daisy Rayner.

== Titleholders ==
=== Unduk Ngadau ===
Year	Unduk Ngadau	District/Region	Reference(s)
2026	Gelvia Vanessa Jenny	Papar	
2025	Atitih Yati Robert	Tamparuli	
2024	Hyellene Danius	Inanam	
2023	Carol Abbey Gail Grimaldi	Papar	
2022	Frenerietta Sobitun	Sandakan	
2021	Maya Hejnowska	Api-Api	
2019	Francisca Ester Nain	Karambunai	
2018	Hosiani James Jaimis	Inanam	
2017	Kerinah Mah	Kota Kinabalu	
2016	Sherry Anne Laujang	Penampang	
2015	Ryannie Neils Yong	Tanjung Aru	
2014	Cheryl Lynn Pinsius	Kota Kinabalu	
2013	Immaculate Lojuki	Kota Kinabalu	
2012	Melinda Louis	Telupid	
2011	Botiza Arthur S. Disimond	Penampang	
2010	Crystel Eve Huminodun William Majimbun	Tanjung Aru	
2009	Appey Rowenna Januin @ Abdoh	Papar	
2008	Leonie Lawrence Gontuni	Penampang	
2007	Joanna Sue Henley Rampas	Tuaran	
2006	Devenna Jaikob	Sulaman	
2005	Madelyne M. Nandu	Penampang	
2004	Fharelynne Ivonne Henry	Tamparuli	
2003	Daphne M. Iking	Klang Valley	
2002	Patrecia Raymond	Kiulu	
2001	Nicolita Sanseh Masi	Petagas	
2000	Regina Intang	Melalap	
1999	Kathie Renjus	Inanam	
1998	Jeremiah Ginajil	Inanam	
1997	Jan Lisamarrie William	Bongawan	
1996	Lynn Afera Wong @ Alfera	Tanjung Papat Sandakan	
1995	Justinah Manius	Kawang	
1994	Agatha Nora Lojimin	Penampang	
1993	Luzie Tham	Inanam	
1992	Anita Pudin	Putatan	
1991	Sylvia Sandralisa Orow	Tuaran	
1990	Julia Augustine	Tanjung Aru	
1989	Deidre Peter Mojuntin	Penampang	
1988	Jennie Alasa	Penampang	
1987	Joan Gloria Tommy	Tanjung Aru	

=== Ratu Pesta Menuai/Ratu Kaamatan ===
Year	Ratu Pesta Menuai/Ratu Kaamatan	District/Region	Reference(s)
1986	Johanna Sybil Disimond	Penampang	
1985	Florence Jipiu	Penampang	
1984	Datin Esther Sikayun	Penampang	
1983	Mary Janet Kinjau	Penampang	
1982	Margaret Dolly Jimayol	Beaufort	
1981	Janet Anthony Dabbi	Penampang	

=== Miss Harvest Festival ===
Year	Miss Harvest Festival	District/Region	Reference(s)
1980	Roslina Amit	Tuaran	(Note: To date, Roslina was the only winner who competed as a Muslim. Due to the enactment of the Sabah Sharia Criminal Offences Enactment in 1995, Muslim women have since been completely banned from competing in the beauty pageant, and any Kadazan-Dusun women who have converted to Islam were also prevented from joining the beauty pageant.)
1979	Mary Solly	Tanjung Aru	
1978	Veronica Jefferin	Penampang	
1977	Mary Marjorie Kinjau	Penampang	
1976	Edwina Totu	Penampang	
1975	Datin Rita Sikawah	Penampang	
1974	Susanna Jipanis	Penampang	
1973	Prisca Tikoh Kulining	Penampang	
1972	Evelyn Sinidol	Penampang	
1971	Mary Jaikoh Imbayan	Tamparuli	

=== Miss Kadazan ===
Year	Miss Kadazan	District/Region	Reference(s)
1970	Helen Mojiniu	Penampang	
1969	Sylvia Totu	Penampang	
1968	Rita Mojilis	Penampang	
1967	Datuk Dr. Florence Bibi	Papar	
1966	Patricia Sinidol	Penampang	
1965	Molina Daniel	Papar	
1964	Datuk Rita Bagong	Tuaran	
1963	Mary Badak	Putatan	
1962	Marcella Tiansim	Papar	
1961	Talian Bunal	Papar	
1960	Yong Mee Lan	Penampang	

== Total wins by district/region ==
District/Region	Win (s)	Year(s)	Reference(s)
Penampang	24	1960, 1966, 1968, 1969, 1970, 1972, 1973, 1974, 1975, 1976, 1977, 1978, 1981, 1983, 1984, 1985, 1986, 1988, 1989, 1994, 2005, 2008, 2011, 2016	
Papar	7	1961, 1962, 1965, 1967, 2009, 2023, 2026	
Tanjung Aru	5	1979, 1987, 1990, 2010, 2015	
Inanam	5	1993, 1998, 1999, 2018, 2024	
Tuaran	4	1964, 1980, 1991, 2007	
Kota Kinabalu	3	2013, 2014, 2017	
Tamparuli	3	1971, 2004, 2025	
Putatan	2	1963, 1992	
Sandakan	1	2022	
Api-Api	1	2021	
Karambunai	1	2019	
Telupid	1	2012	
Sulaman	1	2006	
Klang Valley	1	2003	
Kiulu	1	2002	
Petagas	1	2001	
Melalap	1	2000	
Bongawan	1	1997	
Elopura	1	1996	
Kawang	1	1995	
Beaufort	1	1982	

== See also ==
- Randawi Tavantang, male beauty pageant of Kaamatan
