= Yesterday's You =

2025 Malaysian web series

- Genre: Romantic comedy, Fantasy, Time travel
- Created by: Syarul Akmal
- Written by: Syarul Akmal; Amar Amir; Azhar Amirulhisyam; Farah Alya As'ari; Lyndda Sharudin
- Directed by: Yussuf Yunus
- Starring: Syafiq Kyle; Mira Filzah; Tracie Sinidol
- Country of origin: Malaysia
- Original language: Malay
- No. of seasons: 1
- No. of episodes: 8

Original release
- Network: Viu
- Release: 23 January – 13 February 2025

Yesterday's You (Malay: Gadis Masa) is a Viu Original Malaysian romantic comedy fantasy web series that premiered on Viu on January 23, 2025. The series stars Syafiq Kyle and Mira Filzah as the leads.

== Premise ==
Maya and Khairi's once loving marriage is on the verge of collapse. A fight tragically culminates in a car accident that claims Khairi's life. Grief-stricken, Maya discovers that an umbrella, a memento from their early courtship, possesses the power to transport her back in time to the moment she and Khairi first met. Convinced that preventing their relationship from ever starting is the key to saving Khairi, Maya embarks on a mission to alter the past. However, fate proves to be a formidable force, and each of Maya's attempts to rewrite history leads to a series of unexpected and often humorous consequences.

== Cast ==
- Syafiq Kyle as Khairi
- Mira Filzah as Maya
- Tracie Sinidol as Maya (past)
- Bella Dowanna as Suzana
- Haziq Hussni as Lepat
- Amanda Ang as Ramona
- Razak Ahmad as Khaled
- Nadia Aqilah as Khatijah
- Aleza Shadan as Zetty
- Azhar Sulaiman as Mokhtar

== Production ==
Yesterday's You is a Viu Original series and produced by Cinemalaya Studios. The series was directed by Yussuf Yunus. His notable works include the award-nominated documentary Sudirman Chow Kit Road (2023).

== Awards and nominations ==
Name of the award ceremony, year presented, category, nominee of the award, and the result of the nomination
Award ceremony	Year	Category	Nominee / Work	Result	Ref.
Global OTT Awards	2025	Best OTT Original	Yesterday's You	Nominated	
Asian Academy Creative Awards	2025	Best Comedy Programme	Yesterday's You	Won	
