= Unduk Ngadau 2024 =

2024 beauty pageant in Malaysia

- Date: 31 May 2024
- Presenters: May Salitah; Denis Primus
- Entertainment: Francis Landong; Steve Johnny Mositun
- Venue: Hongkod Koisaan Hall, KDCA, Penampang, Sabah
- Broadcaster: TV Sabah
- Entrants: 51
- Placements: 15
- Winner: Hyellene Danius; Inanam
- Congeniality: Monicka Majin; Keningau
- Natural Beauty: Richella Kan Siang Feng; Kemabong
- Best Evening Dress: Sueillvindra Tangumoh; Pagalungan

Unduk Ngadau 2024 was the 64th edition of Unduk Ngadau pageant which was held on 31 May 2024 at Hongkod Koisaan, Penampang, Sabah, Malaysia. Carol Abbey Gail Grimaldi of Papar crowned her successor, Hyellene Danius of Inanam, at the end of the event.

== Results ==
Placement	Contestant
Unduk Ngadau 2024	Inanam – Hyellene Danius
1st Runner-up	Kiulu – Elldiwirna Saimen
2nd Runner-up	Keningau – Monicka Majin
3rd Runner-up	Johor – Romandawi Gapari
4th Runner-up	Tenom – Liane Melve Grace Lias
5th Runner-up	Tongod – Elviana Gunong
6th Runner-up	Kemabong – Richella Kan Siang Feng
Top 15	Kota Belud – Ryna Norzita Raimon; Kota Kinabalu – Nurul Yanadido; Kunak – Feinny Khoo Kim Ni; Semporna – Marie Ann Cheah Ie Hwa; Tamparuli – Stella Eriecka Albert; Tanjung Aru – Jovita Claire Joseph; Telupid – Queency Isabelle Ladzrus; Tuaran – Natasha Jane Geoffrey

=== Special awards ===
Major awards	Contestant
Basaan Tinandai Togingo (Best in Evening Dress)	Pagalungan – Sueillvindra Tangumoh
Basaan Tinunturu om Linangkit Notinagas (Best Handwork Evening Gown)	Pitas – Jetilyna Jenytah Juzin
Tati Tosuau (Miss Congeniality)	Keningau – Monicka Majin
Tati Topiodo (Miss Natural Beauty)	Kemabong – Richella Kan Siang Feng
Subsidiary awards	Contestant
Tati Otoonong	Tenom – Liane Melve Grace Lias
Miss Sawit Kinabalu	Tuaran – Natasha Jane Geoffrey
Miss Bold Pepsi	Tongod – Elviana Gunong
Miss Imago	Membakut – Nicole Lynn Maurice
Miss Mantra Humanity	Kota Kinabalu – Nurul Yanadido
Miss Yummy Yeah Coffee	Kunak – Feinny Khoo Kim Ni
Miss Culture, Agritourism and Nature (Miss CAN)	Papar – Magdalen Jenny

== Contestants ==
51 contestants competed for the title.

No.	District	Contestant	Placement
01	Kemabong	Richella Kan Siang Feng	6th Runner-up
02	Putrajaya	Allvera Azerra Jaunik	
03	Pagalungan	Sueillvindra Tangumoh	
04	Sook	Junesia Nesious	
05	Penampang	Marcerine Marcus Molison	
06	Tambunan	Clarice Octavia Peter	
07	Sarawak	Qheesthyna Issandra Ladzrus	
08	Papar	Magdelen binti Jenny	
09	Nabawan	Alesyah Asa	
10	Matunggong	Edna Christabella Kin Vun	
11	KDCA Bandaraya	Locebeth Linsing	
12	Putatan	Mary Grace Lojuki	
13	Kudat	Vanessa Geafri	
14	Karambunai	Cathlana Augustine	
15	Sandakan	Joanne Elodea Jonis	
16	Banggi	Princessy Teresa Leonna	
17	Beaufort	Abigail Ary Aylverttsonn	
18	Tungku	Angelynna Angel Ronnie	
19	Paitan	Elvera Latius	
20	Pitas	Jetilyna Jenytah Juzin	
21	Kunak	Feinny Khoo Kim Ni	Top 15
22	Beluran	Viezyeci Hebron	
23	Tenom	Liane Melve Grace Lias	4th Runner-up
24	KDCA Kapayan	Adlyn Janet Adelaine	
25	Tongod	Elviana Gunong	5th Runner-up
26	Sipitang	Amanda Mabellove Piusai	
27	Johor	Romandawi Gapari	3rd Runner-up
28	Penang	Evini Claudia Joseph Majakui	
29	Tuaran	Natasha Jane Geoffrey	Top 15
30	Keningau	Monicka Majin	2nd Runner-up
31	Kuala Penyu	Sandra Rosella Charles	
32	Membakut	Nicole Lynn Maurice	
33	Menumbok	Megann April Kiok	
34	Klang Valley	Vallysa Valerry Henry	
35	Kiulu	Elldiwirna Saimen	1st Runner-up
36	Kota Marudu	Arnelin Aliziana Rosmin	
37	Tawau	Marylyn Nius	
38	Ranau	Charlene Lyra Rojer	
39	Perak	Janecy Joyce John Ambrose	
40	Melaka	Welma Esteffanie Walter	
41	Lahad Datu	Mierlyiesangiela Simon	
42	Telupid	Queency Isabelle Ladzrus	Top 15
43	Tanjung Aru	Jovita Claire Joseph	Top 15
44	WP Labuan	Princessca Yvanne Kimberly	
45	Inanam	Hyellene Danius	Winner
46	Kota Belud	Ryna Norzita Raimon	Top 15
47	Kalabakan	Eristyclarice Liddin	
48	Kota Kinabalu	Nurul Yanadido	Top 15
49	Tamparuli	Stella Eriecka Albert	Top 15
50	Kinabatangan	Magdlena Dinoh	
51	Semporna	Marie Ann Cheah Ie Hwa	Top 15
