= Tracie Sinidol =

Malaysian actress and model

- Born: 24 September 2001 (age 24); Tambunan, Sabah, Malaysia
- Other name: Tracie
- Education: Malaysian Certificate of Education (STPM)
- Occupations: Actress, model
- Years active: 2017–present
- Height: 159 cm (5 ft 3 in)
- Parents: Sinidol Stimin (father); Veronica Tajin (mother)

Tracie Sinidol (born 24 September 2001) is a Malaysian actress and model. Her career began after she was crowned the champion of Dewi Remaja 2021/2022.

== Early life ==
Tracie was born in Tambunan, Sabah and raised in Keningau. She is the fifth of 9 siblings to Sinidol Stimin who is of Murut descent from Tenom and Veronica Tajin who is of Dusun descent from Tambunan.

== Career ==
Tracie was once crowned the champion of the Unduk Ngadau Tambunan 2021 beauty pageant in conjunction with the Tambunan Kaamatan Festival. Her sister, Grace once won a beauty pageant in the Kalimaran Murut and Unduk Ngadau Kaamatan festival.

In 2022, Tracie was selected as one of the Dewi Remaja 2021/2022 participants and was crowned the overall champion, taking home a cash prize of RM 10,000 and a trophy. She was also voted as Dewi Favourite through an online fan vote.

Her acting career began when she was offered to star in the drama Imam Instant Ustazah Scammer by making a special appearance. After that, she appeared in the drama Puaka Cuti Semester, followed by One Million Dollar Voice and Luruhnya Bunga Cinta. She had previously also acted in the telefilm Negaraku 16 September and Budak Pasar directed by Jurey Latiff Rosli. Tracie has also been a model in the music video for the song "Mengengum Bahagia" sung by Sufian Suhaimi.

== Filmography ==
=== Film ===
Year	Title	Character	Notes
2023	KK Knockout		
2025	Blood Brothers: Bara Naga	Mira	
2026	Malaikat Malam	Ratna	

=== Drama ===
Year	Title	Character	TV channels	Note
2023	Imam Instant Ustazah Scammer	Yaya	Astro Ria	First drama, special appearance
2023	One Million Dollar Voice	Aida	Astro Ria	
2023	Luruhnya Bunga Cinta	Nuha Hamisya	TV3	
2024	Hikayat Bawang Putih Bawang Merah	Pari-Pari Embun	Astro Ceria	
2024	Luruhnya Bunga Cinta 2	Nuha Hamisya	TV3	
2025	Antara Dua Syurga	May / Jannah	TV3	
2025	Hilang Dalam Rindu	Aira Nadira	TV3	
2026	Hilang Dalam Rindu 2	Aira Nadira	TV3	
2026	Dendam Seorang Mentua	Sofia	Astro Prima	
TBA	Ammara Batrisya 2	Batrisya	TV3	
TBA	Ammara Batrisya 3	Batrisya	TV3	

=== Web drama ===
Year	Title	Character	TV Channel	Notes
2023	Puaka Cuti Semester	Leha	Watch	First Drama
2025	Gadis Masa	Maya	Viu	

=== Telemovie ===
Year	Title	Character	TV Channel	Notes
2017	Negaraku 16 September	Herself	Astro Citra	First telefilm; additional cast
2023	Diari Chinta	Chinta	Astro Ria	

=== Music video ===
Year	Title	Singer
2023	"Mengengam Bahagia"	Sufian Suhaimi

== Discography ==
=== Singles ===
==== Duets ====
Year	Title	Artist	Notes
2026	"Ku Tetap Ada"	Jazmy Juma	Theme song for Hilang Dalam Rindu 2.

Awards and achievements
Preceded by Shaza Bae	Dewi Remaja; 2021/2022	Succeeded by Nurel Baharin
