= Unduk Ngadau 2025 =

2025 beauty pageant in Malaysia

- Date: 31 May 2025
- Presenters: Jovenea Jim; Denis Primus
- Entertainment: Dabra Sia; Esther Applunius; Adam Shamil
- Venue: Hongkod Koisaan Hall, KDCA, Penampang, Sabah
- Broadcaster: TV Sabah
- Entrants: 51
- Placements: 15
- Winner: Atitih Yati Robert; Tamparuli
- Congeniality: Einnawenda Wenceslaus; Kunak
- Natural Beauty: April Adelaine Agedius; Tuaran
- Best Evening Dress: Slecther Myranda Floyd; Penampang

Unduk Ngadau 2025 was the 65th edition of Unduk Ngadau pageant which was held on 31 May 2025 at Hongkod Koisaan, Penampang, Sabah, Malaysia.

== Background ==
This is the 65th edition of Unduk Ngadau pageant with the theme of 'Kaamatan For All' (Kaamatan Montok Toinsanan).

51 contestants from districts in Sabah, including representatives from Sarawak, Johor, Klang Valley, Melaka, Perak and Penang vying for the title of Unduk Ngadau 2025. District of Kinabatangan withdraw from this year’s competition. Small township of Bingkor returns to the competition after 6 years of absence.

Hyellene Danius of Inanam crowned her successor, Atitih Yati Robert of Tamparuli, at the end of the event. This mark the third crown for Tamparuli since 2004.

== Results ==
Placement	Contestant
Unduk Ngadau 2025	Tamparuli – Atitih Yati Robert
1st Runner-up	Tambunan – Elka Alika Pijeh
2nd Runner-up	Kiulu – Celarin Jenny
3rd Runner-up	Beluran – Rini Swanda Jukilin
4th Runner-up	Beaufort – Steavaynie Ginadus
5th Runner-up	Ranau – Jenylin Janis
6th Runner-up	Kota Kinabalu – Evanatie Sannie
Top 15	Keningau – Lesdianaley Matius; Kudat – Dolly Haizal Densol; Penampang – Slecther Myranda Floyd; Penang – Raysenda Protasius @ Raynolf; Perak – Petronelizin Jackson; Pitas – Nicolyn Rosleen; Sarawak – Izavel Alesandra Beko; Sook – Jacqlyna Doney

== Special awards ==
Special awards were given during the Sodop Unduk Ngadau 2025 which held on 28 May 2025 at Hongkod Koisaan, Penampang, Sabah, Malaysia. 14 subsidiary titles were given to the respective winners.

Major awards	Contestant
Tati Tosuau (Miss Congeniality)	Kunak – Einnawenda Wenceslaus
Tati Topiodo (Miss Natural Beauty)	Tuaran – April Adelaine Agedius
Basaan Tinandai Togingo (Best in Evening Dress)	Penampang – Slecther Myranda Floyd
Basaan Tinunturu om Linangkit Notinagas (Best Handwork Evening Gown)	Kota Kinabalu – Evanatie Sannie
Subsidiary awards	Contestant
Miss Culture, Agritourism and Nature (Miss CAN)	Ranau – Jenylin Janis
Miss Beautiful Smile (Phi Dental)	Papar – Ann Rachel Oilon
Tati Tagaras Pepsi (Miss Strong)	Kemabong – Bibiana Wong Pau Yun
Tati Kaanangan Maxis (Miss Popular)	Kota Kinabalu – Evanatie Sannie
Tati Taani Imago (Miss Friendly)	Kota Kinabalu – Evanatie Sannie
Miss Flawless Skintific	WP Labuan – Lorain Ephrin Chan
Tati Obingupus Ai Cha (Miss Loving & Caring)	Kota Kinabalu – Evanatie Sannie
Tati Tabaal Kovac (Miss Creative & Talented)	Sarawak – Izavel Alesandra Beko
Tati Otoonong	Lahad Datu – Paige Naville Chong
Tati Kinabalu	Tamparuli – Atitih Yati Robert

== Contestants ==
51 contestants competed for the title. The number of contestants are according to their respective number holder.

No.	District	Contestant	Placement
01	KDCA Bandaraya	Nelmui Muhari	
02	Tenom	Fayedonna Romeo	
03	Perak	Petronelizin Jackson	Top 15
04	Tamparuli	Atitih Yati Robert	Winner
05	Semporna	Pinqie Ivany Benrond	
06	Kiulu	Celarin binti Jenny	2nd Runner-up
07	Melaka	Brolyn Bilid Benjamin	
08	Tanjung Aru	Cherub Sharleena Cassdey	
09	Kota Kinabalu	Evanatie Sannie	6th Runner-up
10	Tungku	Rosa Eligius	
11	Tuaran	April Adelaine Agedius	
12	Kunak	Einnawenda Wenceslaus	
13	Beluran	Rini Aswanda Jukilin	3rd Runner-up
14	Putrajaya	Emelka Ryner	
15	Penampang	Slecther Myranda Floyd	Top 15
16	Ranau	Jenylin Janis	5th Runner-up
17	Keningau	Lesdianaley Matius	Top 15
18	WP Labuan	Lorain Ephrin Chan	
19	Menumbok	Melleney Melvin	
20	Sandakan	Elly Reachel Marcus	
21	Sook	Jacqlyna Doney	Top 15
22	Sarawak	Izavel Alesandra Beko	Top 15
23	Sipitang	Michelle Labo	
24	Penang	Raysendra Protasius @ Raynolf	Top 15
25	Bingkor	Alvera Tassry	
26	Matunggong	Velleryn Vivienne Hikson	
27	Karambunai	Jaclyn Ashley Honorius Jillu	
28	Tongod	Winddy Pearl Gibson	
29	Inanam	Ivy Davina David	
30	Kota Marudu	Adrina Alvera Kladius	
31	Kuala Penyu	Hazeville Tan	
32	Kota Belud	Allvera Azerra Jaunik	
33	Beaufort	Steavaynie Ginadus	4th Runner-up
34	Kalabakan	Yohana Petrus	
35	Putatan	Sabrina Tubong	
36	Papar	Ann Rachel Oilon	
37	Lahad Datu	Paige Naville Chong	
38	Kemabong	Bibiana Wong Pau Yun	
39	Telupid	Fellisa Earla	
40	Banggi	Airiana Rannie Jospuin	
41	Paitan	De Souza Rojer	
42	Nabawan	Emylia Easter	
43	Pagalungan	Velintinah Marcus	
44	Tambunan	Elka Alika Pijeh	1st Runner-up
45	Johor	Ally Lyverra Julius	
46	Membakut	Iellysia Juanis	
47	Kapayan	Carolyn Tony	
48	Kudat	Dolly Haizal Densol	Top 15
49	Klang Valley	Norasnih Madjalan	
50	Tawau	Mercy Steffie Wong	
51	Pitas	Nicolyn Rosleen	Top 15
