= Putatan District =

- District of Malaysia
- Daerah Putatan

Other transcription(s)
  - Jawi: داءيره ڤوتاتن
  - Chinese: 必打丹县 (Simplified) 必打丹縣 (Traditional); Bìdǎdān xiàn (Hanyu Pinyin)
  - Tamil: புத்தாத்தான் மாவட்டம் Puttāttāṉ māvaṭṭam (Transliteration)
  - Kadazandusun: Uvang Putatan
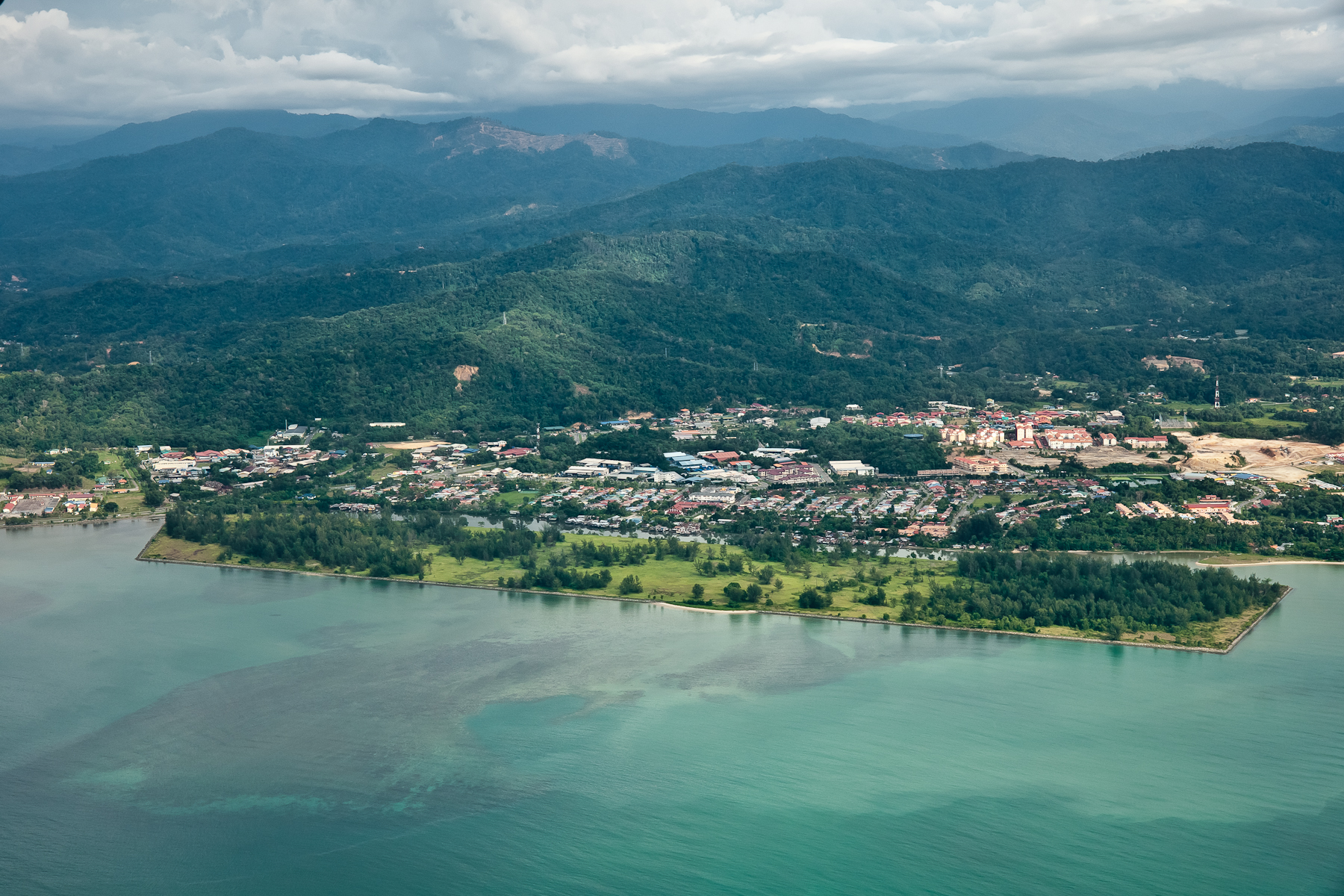
- Putatan aerial view.

- Seal
- Etymology: putat, the local name of a flowering mangrove tree
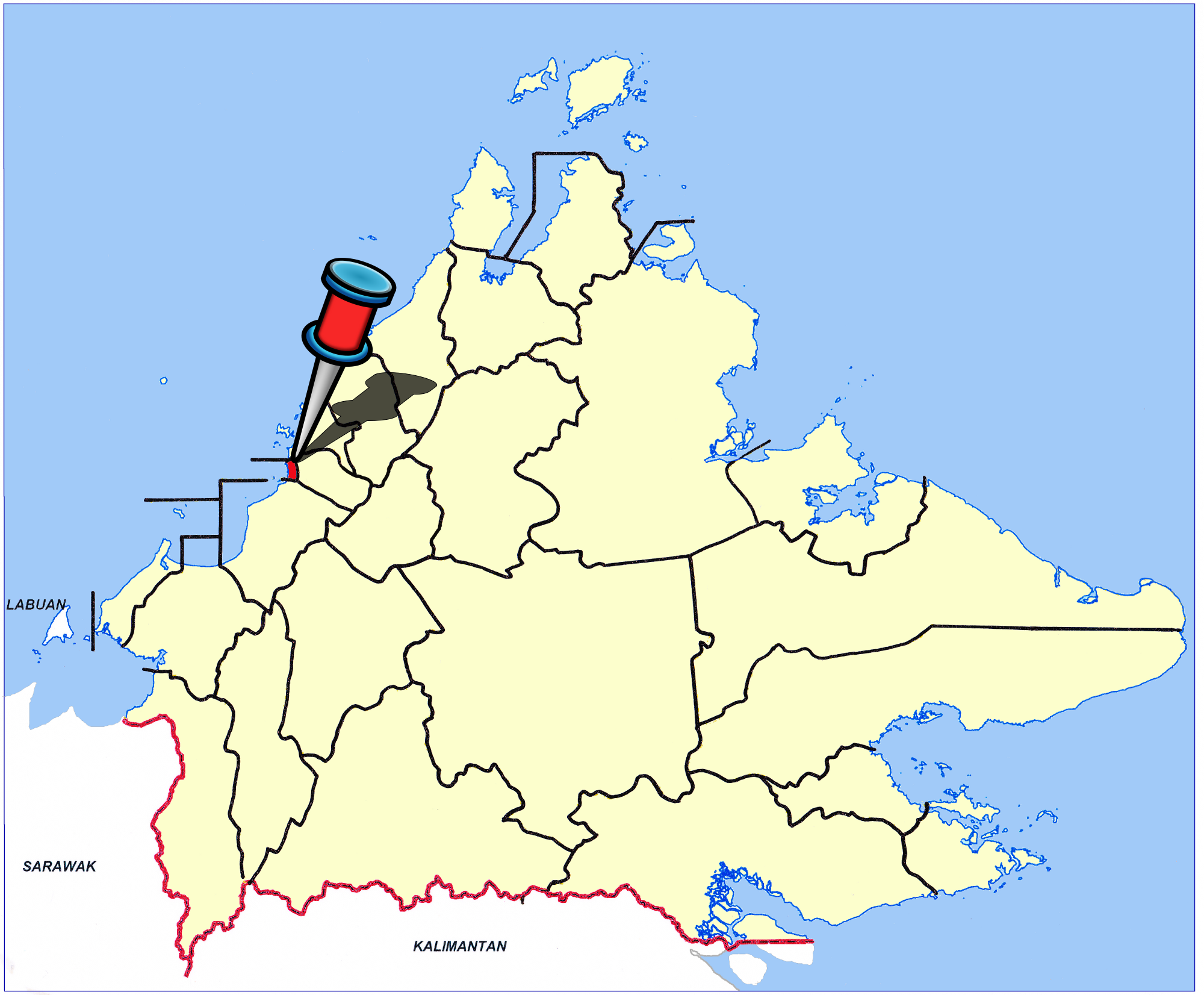
- Location of Putatan District in Sabah
- Interactive map of Putatan District
- Location of Putatan District in Malaysia
- Coordinates: 5°55′00″N 116°07′00″E
- Country: Malaysia
- State: Sabah
- Division: West Coast
- Seat: Putatan
- Local area government(s): Putatan District Council

Government
  - District officer: Mokhtar Hussin
  - District council executive officer: Ahmad Helmy Bin Mohd Taib

Area
  - Total: 29.7 km^{2} (11.5 sq mi)
- Elevation: 20 m (66 ft)
- Highest elevation: 288 m (945 ft)

Population (2019)
  - Total: 71,500
  - Density: 2,410/km^{2} (6,240/sq mi)
- Time zone: UTC+8 (MST)
  - Summer (DST): UTC+8 (Not observed)
- Postcode: 88XXX
- Calling code: +60-88
- Vehicle registration plates: SA
- Website: mdputatan.sbh.gov.my pdputatan.sbh.gov.my

Map of Putatan District

The Putatan district (Malay: Daerah Putatan) is an administrative district in the Malaysian state of Sabah, part of the West Coast Division which includes the districts of Kota Belud, Kota Kinabalu, Papar, Penampang, Ranau and Tuaran. The capital of the district is in Putatan Town. Putatan is a district in Sabah, situated close to Kota Kinabalu, and forms an integral part of the Greater Kota Kinabalu region. As one of the districts near the capital, it plays a vital role in the development and expansion of the metropolitan area.

All matters in this town are under the district jurisdiction except for matters such as education and security are still under the supervision of the Penampang District.

== Etymology ==
The district name originated from "putat", a flowering mangrove tree that was once abundant in the area.

== History ==
On 2 August 2010, the Putatan District Council began to be established as a separate district from Penampang. From 2011, the council was fully granted independent status in all official matters related to the area under its jurisdiction except for security and education matters which are still under the Penampang District jurisdiction.

== Demographics ==
According to the last census in 2010, the population of the district is estimated to be around 54,733, mainly Bruneian Malay and Bajau people as well with a significant number of Kadazan-Dusun and Chinese.

== Gallery ==
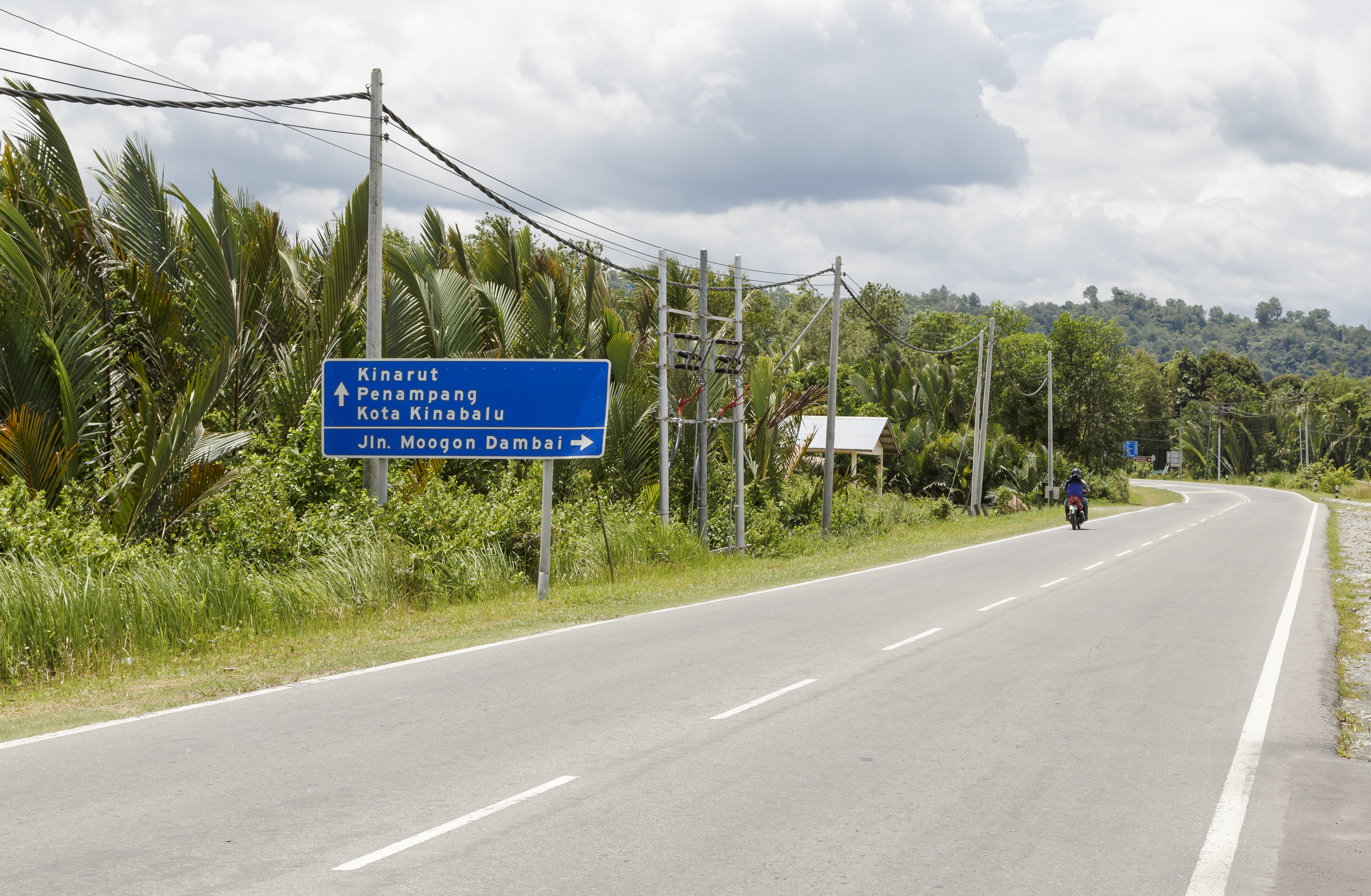
Lok Kawi-Pengalat Road.

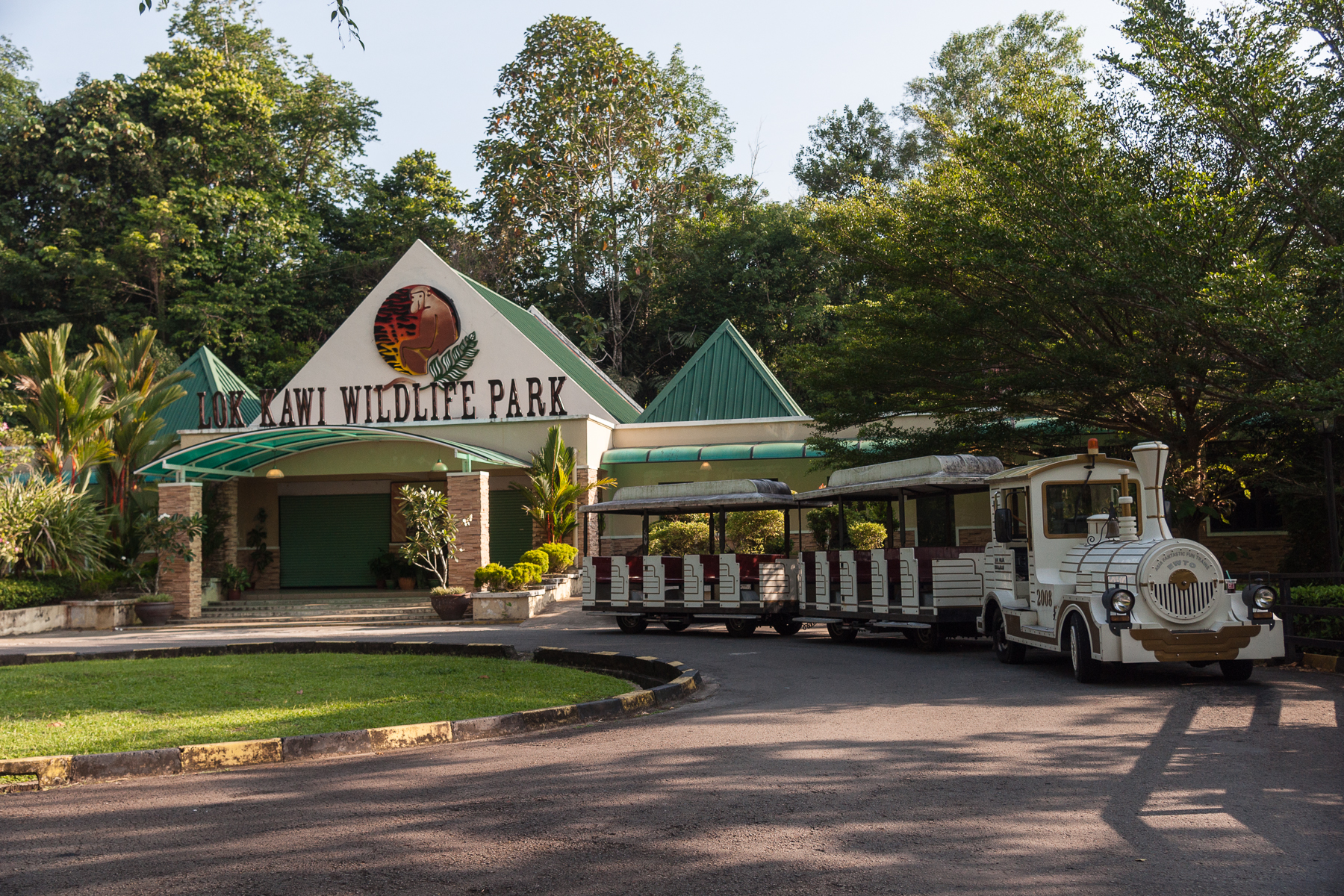
Lok Kawi Wildlife Park.

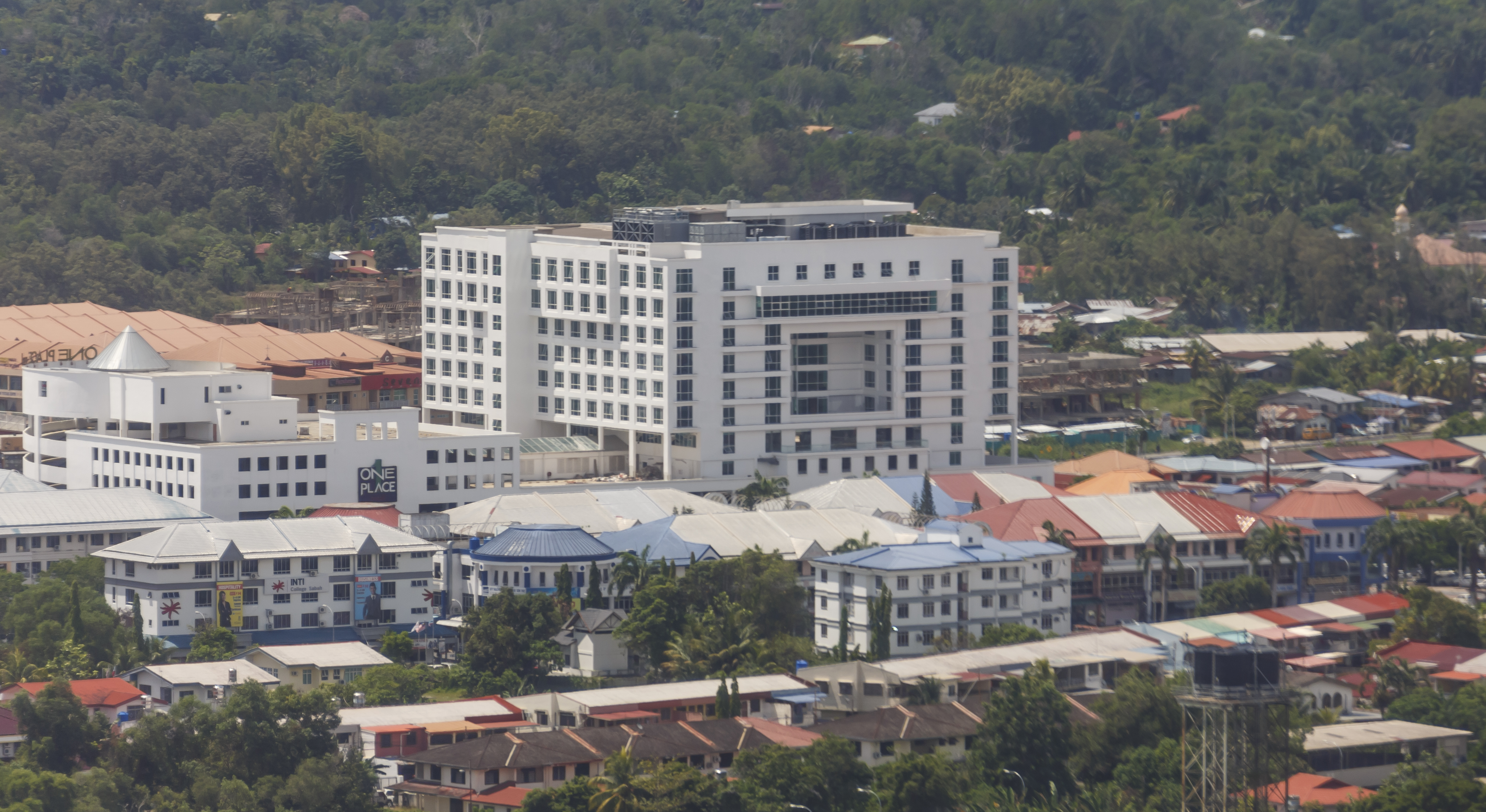
Putatan Mall (formerly One Place Mall).

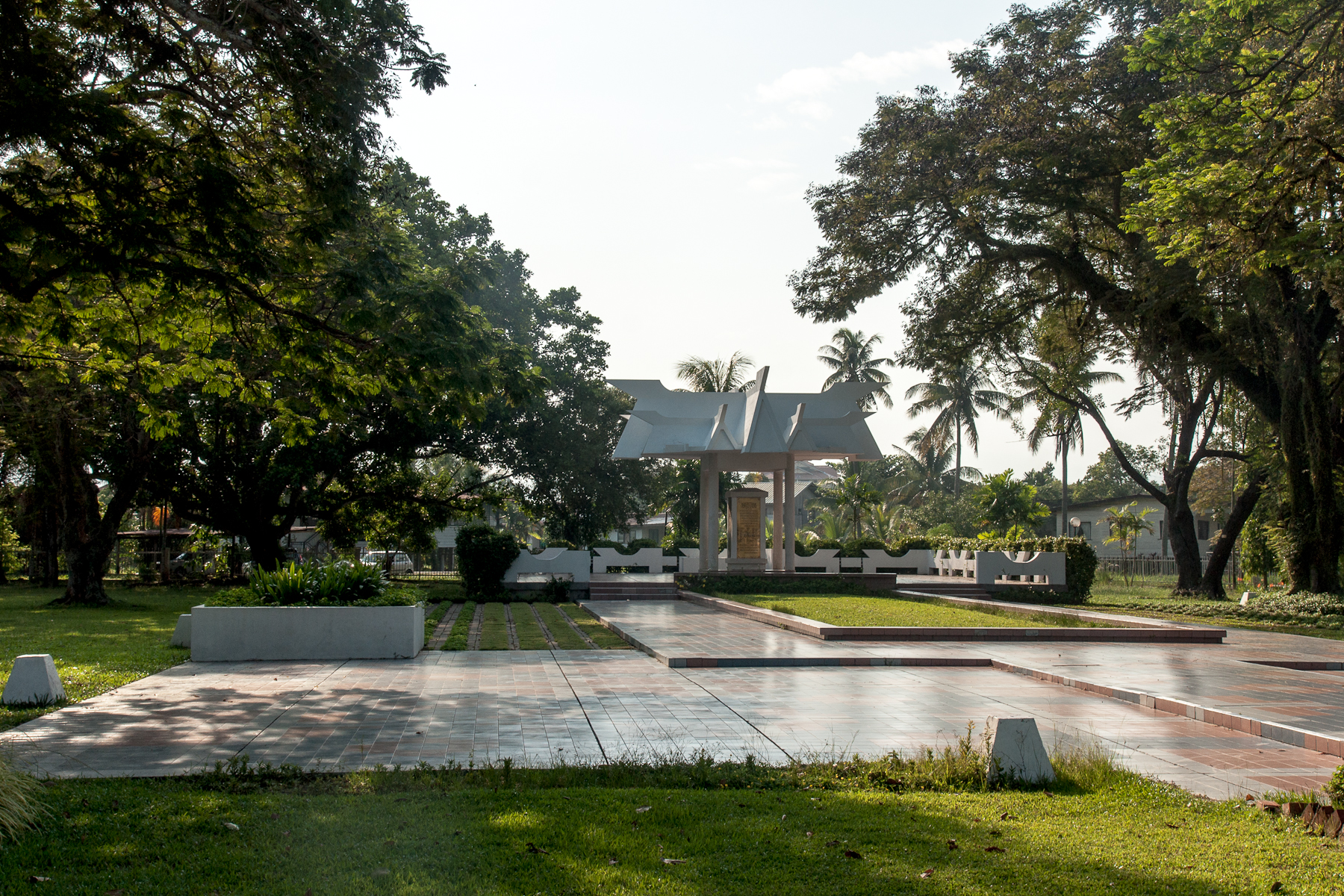
Petagas War Memorial.

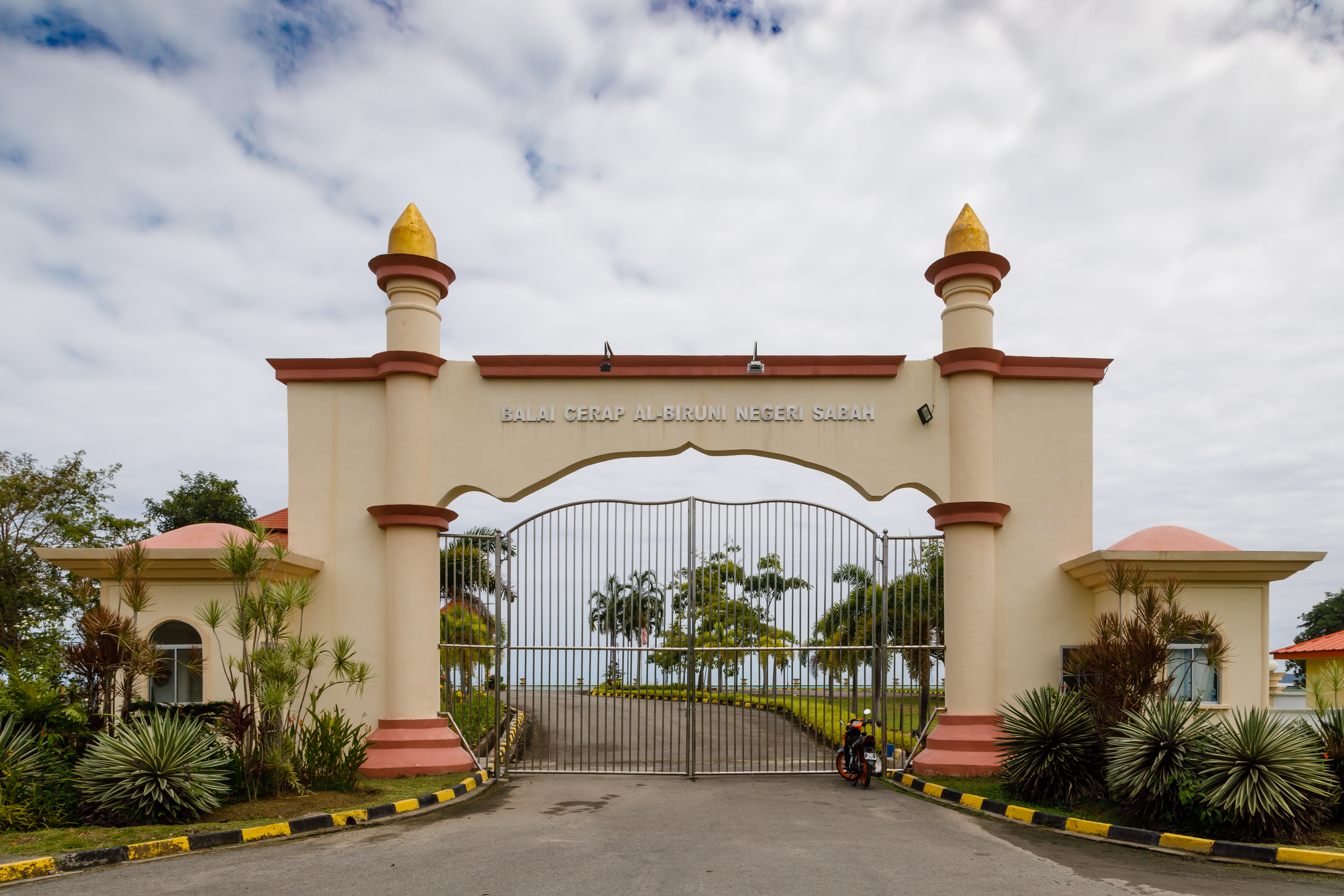
Sabah State Al-Biruni Observatory, an observatory to observe the Moon and to determine the exact date and time for the beginning of the fasting month of Ramadan.

== See also ==
- Districts of Malaysia
