= Randawi Tavantang =

Annual male beauty pageant in Malaysia

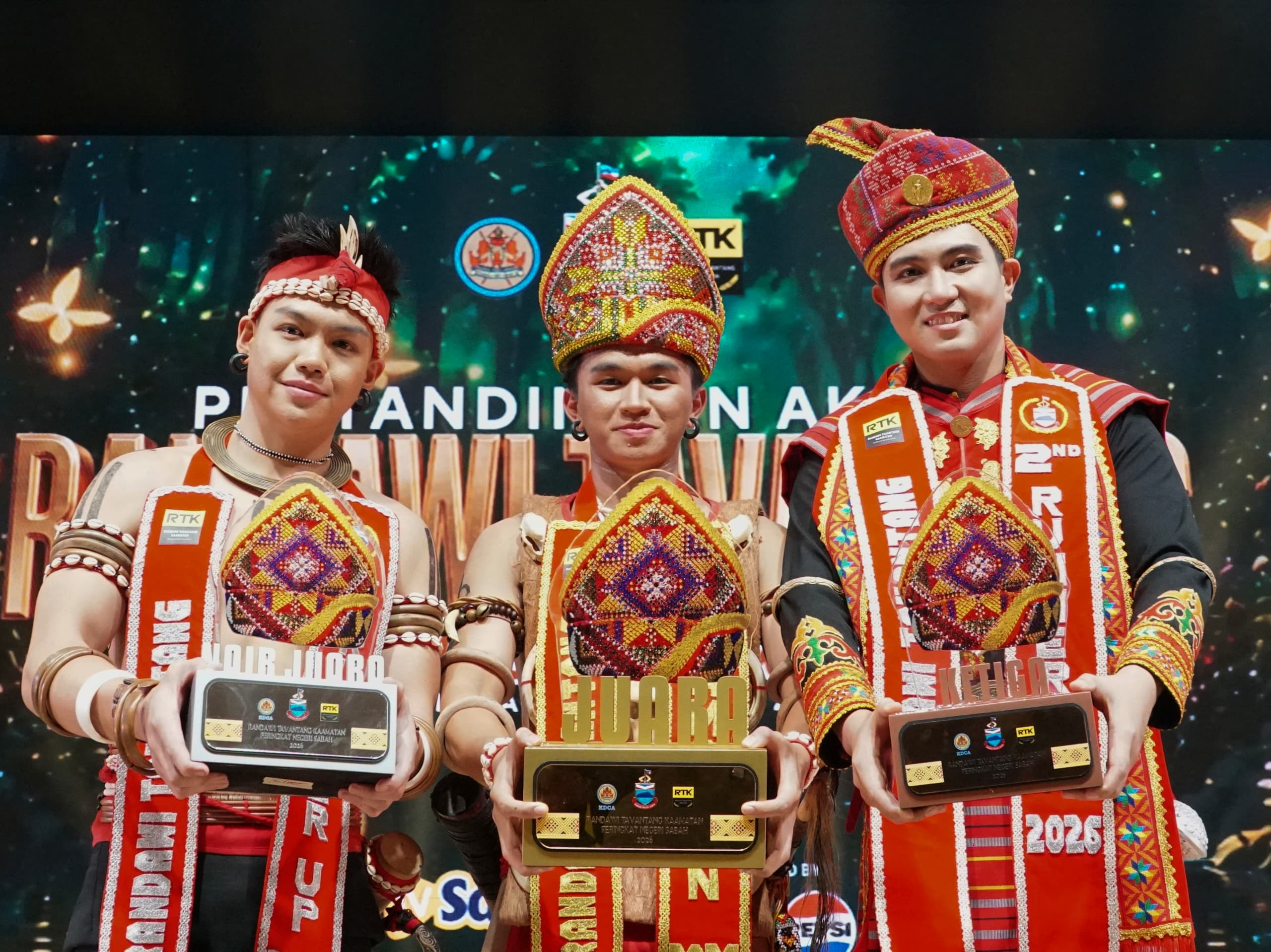
- The Winner of Randawi Tavantang Kaamatan 2026
- Type: Kadazan-Dusun-Murut-Rungus (KDMR) male beauty pageant
- Parent organization: Kadazan Dusun Cultural Association (KDCA)
- Headquarters: Hongkod Koisaan Hall, Penampang District, Sabah, Malaysia
- First edition: 2008 (17–18 years)
- Most recent edition: 2026
- Current titleholder: Dyeneley Daud; Nabawan
- Chairman: Casey Jovial
- Language: Kadazan-Dusun (official); Murut; Rungus; Malay; English
- Website: kdca.org.my

Randawi Tavantang Kaamatan or Mister Kaamatan (MRK) is a male beauty pageant held annually during the Kaamatan cultural event in Sabah, Malaysia. The pageant competition was originally held between different districts in Sabah (district level) and has since been expanded between different states and federal territories (state level) of Malaysia. Currently, the pageant is contested between tanak wagu (Kadazan-Dusun), ungkuyon (Murut) and anakvagu/tanak vagu (Rungus) from each of participating Sabah's districts and territory as well as Kadazan Dusun Cultural Association (KDCA) branches outside Sabah who registered.

It has been around for 17–18 years since its first inception in 2008, with Klang Valley becoming the leading titleholder with the most titles, four, followed by Tuaran District with two and others with one each, respectively. The participants usually either have parentage fully of Kadazan-Dusun-Murut-Rungus (KDMR) descent or partially, and the participants' fluency in the ancestral language, along with knowledgeability, has been a major requirement in recent editions.

The reigning Randawi Tavantang is Dyeneley Daud of Nabawan who was crowned as the 2026 Randawi Tavantang on 27 May 2026 at the Hongkod Koisaan Hall in Penampang, Sabah.

== History ==
The event traced its origin to the first launch in 2008 under the name of "Buvazoi Tavantang" or "Mister Kaamatan", (Note: Buvazoi is used to refer to young single men.) which symbolises the heroism of the KDMR generations within the modern social landscapes of Sabah as well as a counterpart to the female beauty pageant of Unduk Ngadau, which has existed since the 1960s. Earlier held on a small scale, the event was created to symbolise the leadership of Huguan Siou (brave leader), a leader that is responsible for the preservation of KDMR culture in Sabah. Beginning from the 2017 edition, the event was managed by Casey Jovial, (Note: Chairman of Buvazoi Tavantang (2017–2025) and Chairman of Randawi Tavantang (2025–present).) this competition has been registered within the Malaysian Intellectual Property Corporation (MyIPO), the country registrar of trademarks to protect the cultural beauty pageant from misuse by other organisations that have no connection to the official source.

In 2023, it was started to be held in the main hall of the KDCA after 16 years of competition. The event was subsequently officially recognised on 17 May 2025 under the Sabah State Kaamatan Festival Main Committee. From 2025, the event name Buvazoi Tavantang Kaamatan or Mister Kaamatan was officially changed to Randawi Tavantang Kaamatan (Note: Randawi symbolises the soul of a young man who is not only physically strong, but also rich in values, cultural roots and a spirit of love for the nation's heritage.) or Mister Kaamatan. The rebranding was a shift in meaning for the competition, which continues to be honoured, given new life, and remains relevant in the Kaamatan celebration.

== Titleholders ==
Year	District or territory	Mister Kaamatan	Note	Chairman
Buvazoi Tavantang (2008–2024)
2008	Tuaran	Keddy Mahdfuz		Walter Misir / Martin Buguk
2009	Klang Valley	Jeffrey James Tanggau		Walter Misir / Martin Buguk
2010	Tamparuli	Wheelevon Primus		
2011	Tuaran	Izham Aziz		
2012	Klang Valley	Juanis Mering		
2013	Inanam	Calvin Patrick Mojinun		
2014	Kuala Penyu	Nigel Marudin		
2015	Papar	Andey Chung		
2016	Kudat	Feraddy Adie Okuling		Dee Layun
2017	Keningau	Isaiah Dicky Jerry		Casey Jovial
2018	Klang Valley	Mohd Saiful Azwan Sundian		Casey Jovial
2019/2020	Penampang	Nathaniel Wallace Kenneth Mosusi		Casey Jovial
2021	Sipitang	Royvernand Jaydarren Ronnie		Casey Jovial
2022	Johor	Stefanus Able		Casey Jovial
2023	Putrajaya	Tommy G Gedeus		Casey Jovial
2024	Klang Valley	Bonyvanture Hee Yi		Casey Jovial
Randawi Tavantang (2025–present)
2025	Ranau	Mike Melvin Lee Larry		Casey Jovial
2026	Nabawan	Dyeneley Daud		Casey Jovial

== 1st runner-up until 6th runner-up ==
Years	1st Runner-up	2nd Runner-up	3rd Runner-up	4th Runner-up	5th Runner-up	6th Runner-up	Note
2016	Adam Shamil Johor	Geo Allan George Klang Valley	Lachel Ardi Rupin Penang	Nicolaus Joslin Bangi	Fabian Sipitang	Casey Jovial Putatan	
2017	Bonaventure Yampai Junior Menumbok	Samuel Yahing Sook	Maxmillian Brandon Jion Motowill Penampang	Bonyvanture Hee Yi Kota Kinabalu	Petley Nyle Peter Sipitang	Vallent Pierre Peter Tuaran	
2018	Larry Lajinoh Ranau	Bruno George Sadiwa Inanam	Alvin Roy Oilon Sipin Papar	Layron Rick Mathius Kudat	Suili George Kota Kinabalu	Joantin Jimmy Kintiu Kota Belud	
2019/2020	Mohammad Haffie Ashraff Ali Tenom	Erwin Sylvester Joseph Kuala Penyu	Howard Mike George Tawau	Jason Matthew Guntala Keningau	Ellton Linsayan Penang	Remeo Anjulus Kepayan	
2021	Leolerry Lajius Kiulu	Eduff Exl Elik Johor	Achilles Elor @ Francis Tuaran	Aelvin Richard Penampang	Mohd Nazmi Gitol Sook	Sean Isaac Marcony Putatan	
2022	Jafrejoe Japrin Kota Kinabalu	Maxwell Elity Sulaiman Kemabong	Donny Johan Keningau	Paenus Kansirong Putrajaya	Christopher Joseph Udat Tenom	Stanley Supin Sook	
2023	Deaigo Imanuell Warying Penang	Lexterinus Harris Klang Valley	Joenier Fraider Johny Tambunan	Adner Fabrizzio Jamain Kudat	Eric Junior George Kota Belud	Janius Joseph Nabawan	
2024	Jeffry Jumenik @ James Sipitang	Jack Arrey Jaim Labuan	Achilles Elor @ Francis Libaran	Douglas Lee Yong Liang Kemabong	Oswald Xavier Puji Papar	Reky Chee Hau Jun Penampang	
2025	Bryan Soo Kota Kinabalu	Arnold Jaideh Kota Belud	Fachai Sikana Nabawan	Reccarlo Divann Rex Matunggong	Stephen Sibir Junior Penampang	Macknouel Munis Putatan	
2026	Bryan Niccolson Jacob Keningau	Daniel Chrionie Taning Tamparuli	Hassan Der Jaid Kiulu	Kristern Olwen Jafili Tuaran	Ian Steeve Dee Moses Likas	Hadwanielley Allan Ranau	

== Wins by districts or territories ==
District or territory	Wins	Year(s)
Klang Valley	4	2009, 2012, 2018, 2024
Tuaran	2	2008, 2011
Nabawan	1	2026
Ranau	1	2025
Putrajaya	1	2023
Johor	1	2022
Sipitang	1	2021
Penampang	1	2019 / 2020
Keningau	1	2017
Kudat	1	2016
Papar	1	2015
Kuala Penyu	1	2014
Inanam	1	2013
Tamparuli	1	2010

== See also ==
- Unduk Ngadau, female beauty pageant of Kaamatan
