= Huminodun =

Mythological character of the Dusun people of Malaysia

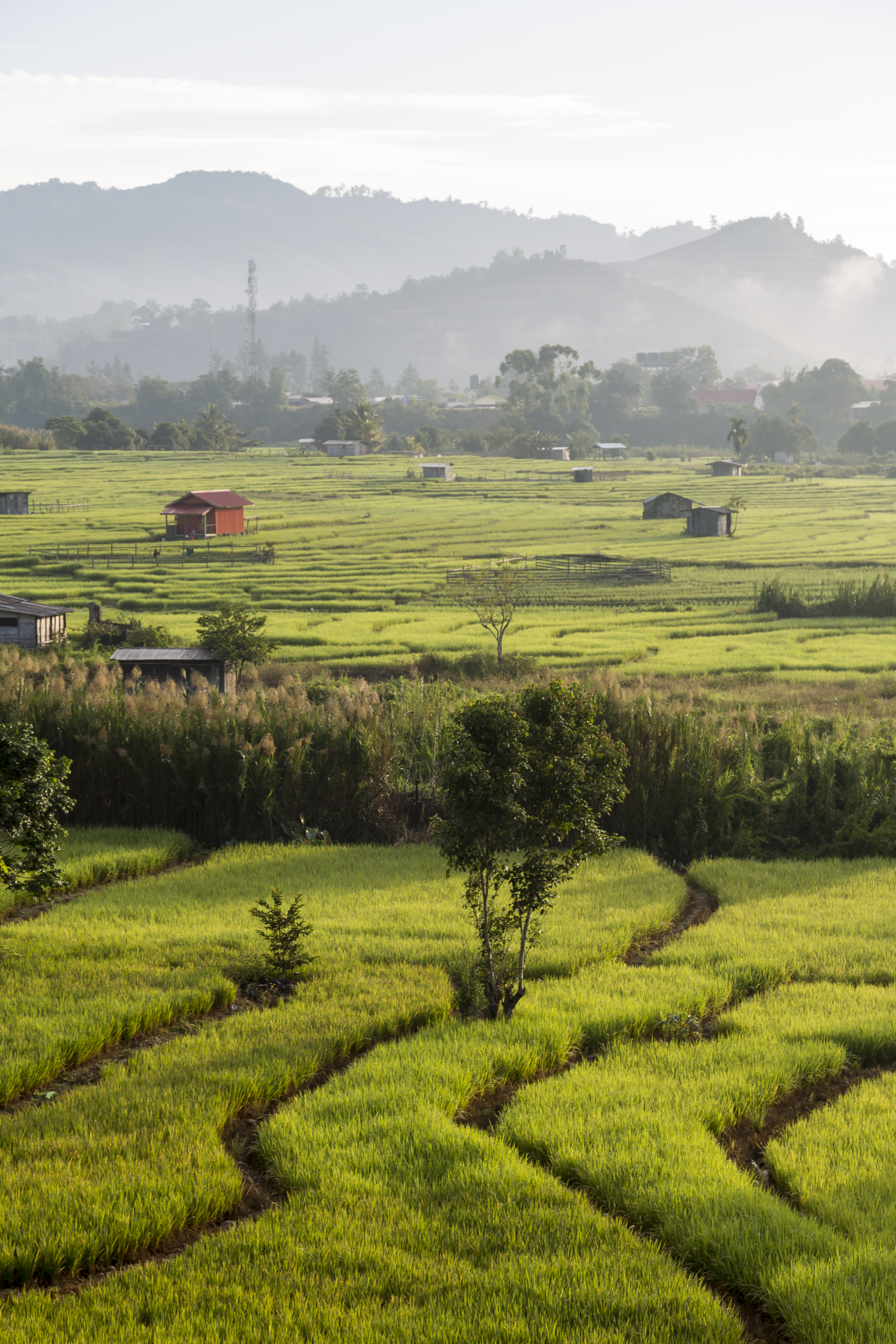
A paddy field in Tambunan District of the Interior Division; the legend of Huminodun forms the basis of rice planting rituals as well as the belief in the paddy spirit Bambarayon among the indigenous Kadazan-Dusun of Sabah

Huminodun is a character in the Nunuk Ragang legend of the Kadazan-Dusun. According to the legend, Huminodun was a maiden sacrificed to feed her famine-stricken people, and her sacrifice became the origin of the Kaamatan harvest festival and the beauty pageant of Unduk Ngadau, celebrated annually in the month of May by the Kadazan-Dusun community in the state of Sabah and the federal territory of Labuan in Malaysia. (Note: The legend of Huminodun is the root of the annual harvest festival of Kaamatan and the Unduk Ngadau beauty pageant celebrated annually in the month of May by the Kadazan-Dusun community.)

The sacrifice story of Huminodun is also considered neither a folklore nor a legend, but more of a religious observance of the Kadazan-Dusun of Sabah and Labuan. It forms the origin of the community's earlier religion of Momolianism as well as the basis of rice planting rituals performed by the bobohizan for a continuous bountiful harvest and the significance of rice and ancestral reverence in the traditional beliefs of the Kadazan-Dusun community.

== Attributes and legends ==
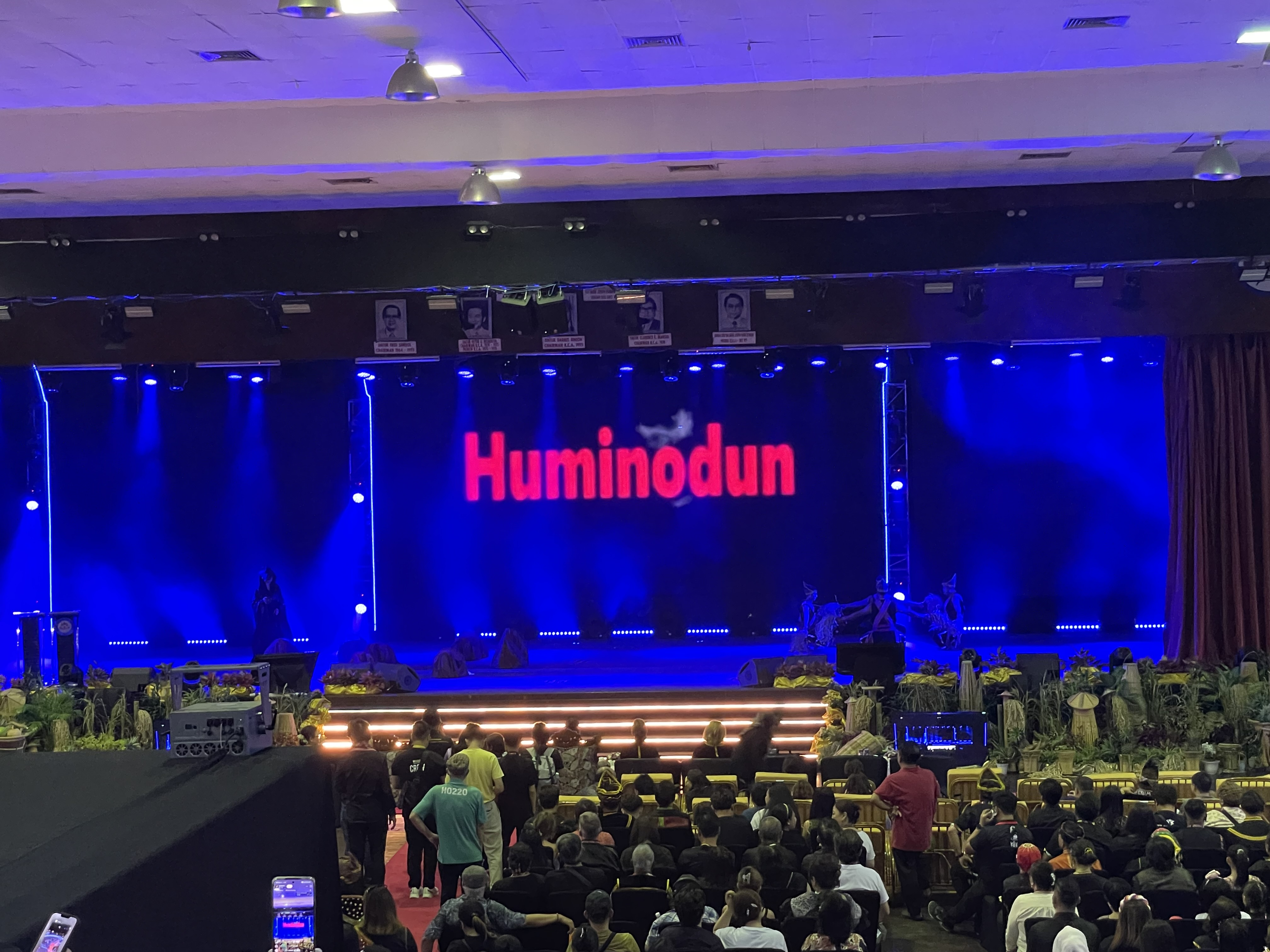
A traditional dance performance themed on Huminodun at the Hongkod Koisaan Hall

Kinoingan (also referred as Kinorohingan in different sources), the creator deity of the animistic Kadazan, (Note: The worship of Kinoingan is deeply entrenched among the animistic Kadazan-Dusun community that when the Christian missionaries first came to evangelise them in North Borneo, they borrowed the term "Kinoingan" to denote the Christian God in the translation of the Bible into the Kadazan language.) and his wife Suminundu (also referred as Sumundu in different sources) lived happily together in Pomogunan (mankind's world), and they were divine. Suminundu created the earth, including the Kadazan-Dusun sacred mountain of Mount Kinabalu, (Gayo Ngaran or Nulu Nabalu), while Kinoingan filled it with the sky, cloud and all above the earth. Together they had two children: a son named Ponompulan and a daughter named Ponompuan. When Ponompulan began to rebel and corrupted the mind and heart of mankind, he was banished forever from Hibabou to his own creation of Kolungkud (equivalent to the underworld) that resulted from his own deeds, and the mankind world where his followers are located was cursed, which subsequently created the worst famine among the Kadazan-Dusun community, and the land they lived in became so infertile that it could not grow even a single plant to produce food. To end the curse, their only daughter Ponompuan who was kind-hearted, thoughtful and wise was then named Huminodun (lit. ''transferred sacrifice'') following her pure compassion to request herself to be made a sacrifice. Her father Kinoingan learned that the only way to end the famine was by sacrificing innocent blood, and his daughter Huminodun offered herself willingly. She willingly accepted her father's demand as she was determined to save her people from the famine. She told her father:

My body will give rise to all sorts of edible plants to feed the people. My flesh will give rise to rice, my head—the coconut, my bones—tapioca, my toes—ginger, my teeth—maize and my knees—yams. Our people will never go hungry again.

Following her sacrifice, her community had the most bountiful harvest that year. With deep sorrow after losing his most beloved daughter, her father, Kinoingan, went berserk and went to the paddy field, slashing every one of the young plant crops but was stopped when he heard her voice coming from the plants, asking him to stop hurting her further.

The voice comforted the father by telling him that he would be able to see her again when the rice ripened. He must immediately select seven of the tallest stalks and tie them together, cut and bring each of them to their house after harvesting, with one stalk each placed into seven jars, and the jar tops must be covered with tarap (artocarpus odoratissimus) leaves. Her father followed everything as instructed, and one day, he and his wife Suminundu heard knocking inside the seven jars, and when they both began to open each of them, seven beautiful maidens, including their daughter, stood out from each jar with their beauty "resembling the sun at its brightest". Huminodun had fulfilled her promise when her spirit emerged from the largest jar, and her bravery, grace, strength and beauty are commemorated through the annual beauty pageant of Unduk Ngadau. It was after her further resurrection in another form called Bambazon (referred to as Bambarayon across Sabah) that spiritually rose from the paddy, the life of the entire Nunuk Ragang community, as it was then known, began to improve as there was an abundant supply of food.

The legend is believed to be the origin of Momolianism, a type of indigenous animist-pagan religion. (Note: Momolianism is the agama asal (animist-pagan religion) of the Kadazan-Dusun community before embracing Christianity or Islam.) It goes on to narrate that the spirit of Huminodun founded the bobohizan as she taught them the art of incantantion, rituals, taboos, law of sogit and customs, including the art of bamboo-beating and the sumazau dance.

=== The Penampang variant of the Nunuk Ragang story ===
A variation of the main Nunuk Ragang story exists, it has been recognised by the Kadazan Dusun Cultural Association (KDCA). According to the story, from among the Tangara (Kadazan) of Penampang, Nunuk Ragang, (Note: The Tangara of Penampang and Papar is a Kadazan-Dusun tribe who resists the term "Dusun" once coined by early Chinese and Brunei overlords due to a previous dark history related to the Tagahas Dusun for betrayals during a conflict with Mat Salleh in Tambunan. Similarly, the Lotud Dusun of Tuaran were also against the term of "Kadazan" to referring the Tangaah of Penampang and Papar until the problem of the "Kadazan" and "Dusun" term were settled with the recognition of each other.) as pointed out by the late Herman Luping, (Note: Herman Luping was a deputy chief minister of Sabah, lawyer and politician. He died on 11 December 2020.) begins with two children, a male and a female, who came out from a rock underneath a big tree called Nunuk Ragang. The rock split open at the banks of the Tompios River. The two children's names were Kinoingan and Suminundu, and they were human beings who possessed supernatural powers, who were semi-divine. God the Creator among the Kadazan-Dusun community is known as Minamangun, and it was Suminundu who sacrificed the daughter, not Kinoingan.

== In popular culture ==
The legend of Huminodun inspired the films of Huminodun, directed and written by Aaron Cowan, and Sinakagon, directed by Timothy Stephen.

In the 2025 edition of the Queen's Commonwealth Essay Competition that was organised by the Royal Commonwealth Society (RCS) under the patronage of King Charles III, an essay on Huminodun won first place through the submission by Ferdiana Osmund, a native Sabahan and first-year automotive technology student at the Keningau Vocational College (KVC) at the time.

== See also ==
- Ceres (mythology), ancient Roman goddess of agriculture, grain crops, fertility, and motherly relationships
- Dewi Sri, Javanese rice goddess
- Phosop, Thai rice goddess
- Thiên Y A Na, Vietnamese goddess
