= KDCA =

KDCA may refer to:

- Kadazandusun Cultural Association, an association of the indigenous ethnic groups of Sabah, Malaysia
- Ronald Reagan Washington National Airport (ICAO: KDCA), an airport in Virginia, United States
- Korea Disease Control and Prevention Agency
