= Bobohizan =

Female shamans and traditional healers of the Kadazan-Dusun people of Malaysia

A bobohizan (Kadazan term), bobolian (Bundu Liwan Dusun term) or bobolizan (Rungus term) is a high priestess, a ritual specialist and a spirit medium in the pagan rituals of the Kadazan-Dusun in Sabah, Malaysia. The head bobohizan is the chief preserver of Momolianism (the philosophy and way of life of the Kadazan-Dusun people).

One of the primary roles of the bobohizan is to appease the rice spirit Bambazon during the harvest festival of Kaamatan. In the magavau ritual, which is the origin of the festival, she leads a procession of people from her village through the paddy field to give thanks to the paddy spirit after each harvest. The bobohizan also plays a role as a mediator between the spirits and the people. One of the most common duties of the bobohizan is to heal illnesses through herbal remedies, food offerings, animal offerings, incantations or any combination of them.

== Etymology ==
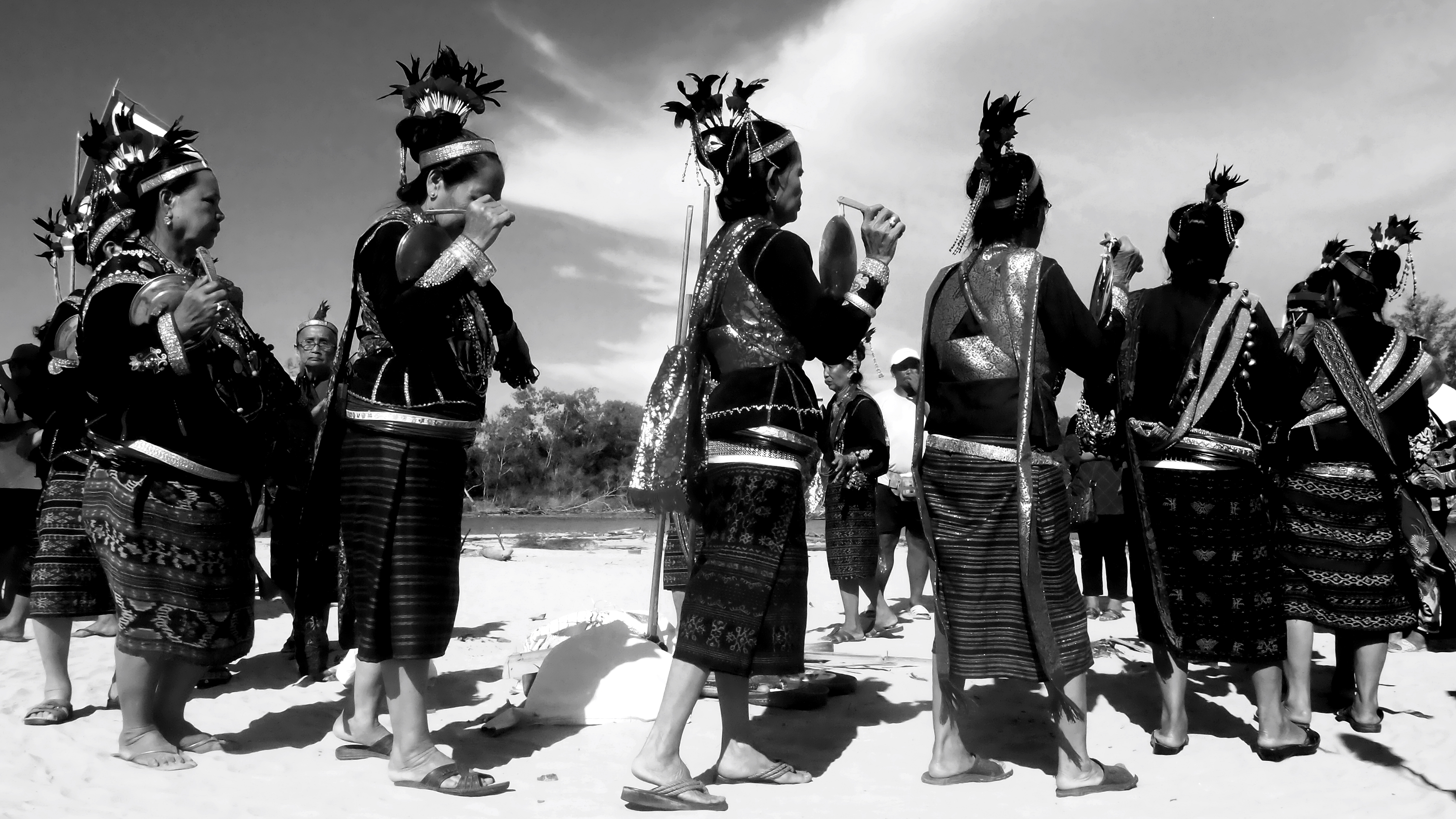
A group of Lotud Dusun tantagas (priestesses) of Tuaran performing the mamahui pogun (universal cleansing) ritual

Across Sabah's various Kadazan-Dusun dialects, the word bobohizan is equivalent to bobolian, babalian, bobolizan, bobogo, lumagon, mogogondi, omboh, ponyupi, and tantagas. The name babalian is common in the Murutic languages, and balian and mininiow are used in the Paitanic languages.

== Origin ==
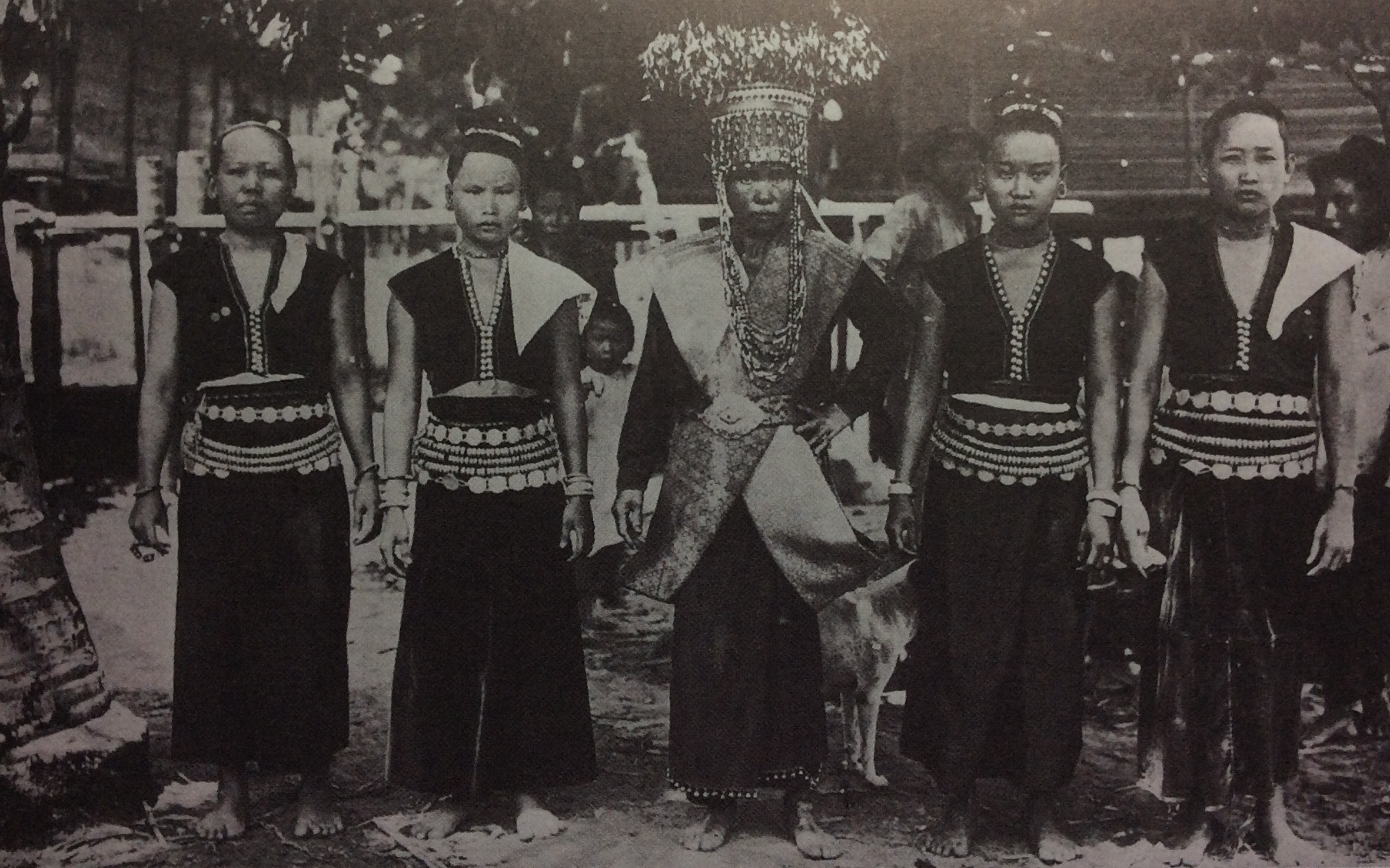
Bobohizan in Putatan, British North Borneo, c. 1920

There are various accounts of the origin of the bobohizan, which differ across districts and subtribes. The most widely accepted origin of the bobohizan is the mythic legend of the deific founding father of the Kadazan-Dusun Kinoingan and his wife Suminundu. Based on the legend, the bobohizan is said to stem from the sacrifice of Ponompuan, whose spirit is believed to have returned and imparted ritualistic knowledge to a woman. It is said that long after the first ancestors died and went to Hibabou (equivalent to Heaven), the rituals and incantations were lost and forgotten. This is when Suminundu sent a spirit to earth to teach them about rituals and the art of incantation. The spirit came every evening, calling upon anyone brave enough to learn. The call was repeated for years but no one was brave enough to come forth until a brave woman went out and meet the spirit in the dark. She learned the art of incantation, or rinait, and rituals from the spirit and passed it on to other women in the village. According to the legend, because of the woman who was brave enough to meet the spirit, all bobohizan across Sabah have customarily been women only. Among the Kimaragang Dusun in northern Sabah, both women and men may become bobolian, though women are traditionally regarded as having greater spiritual power and mastery of rinait.

== Role ==
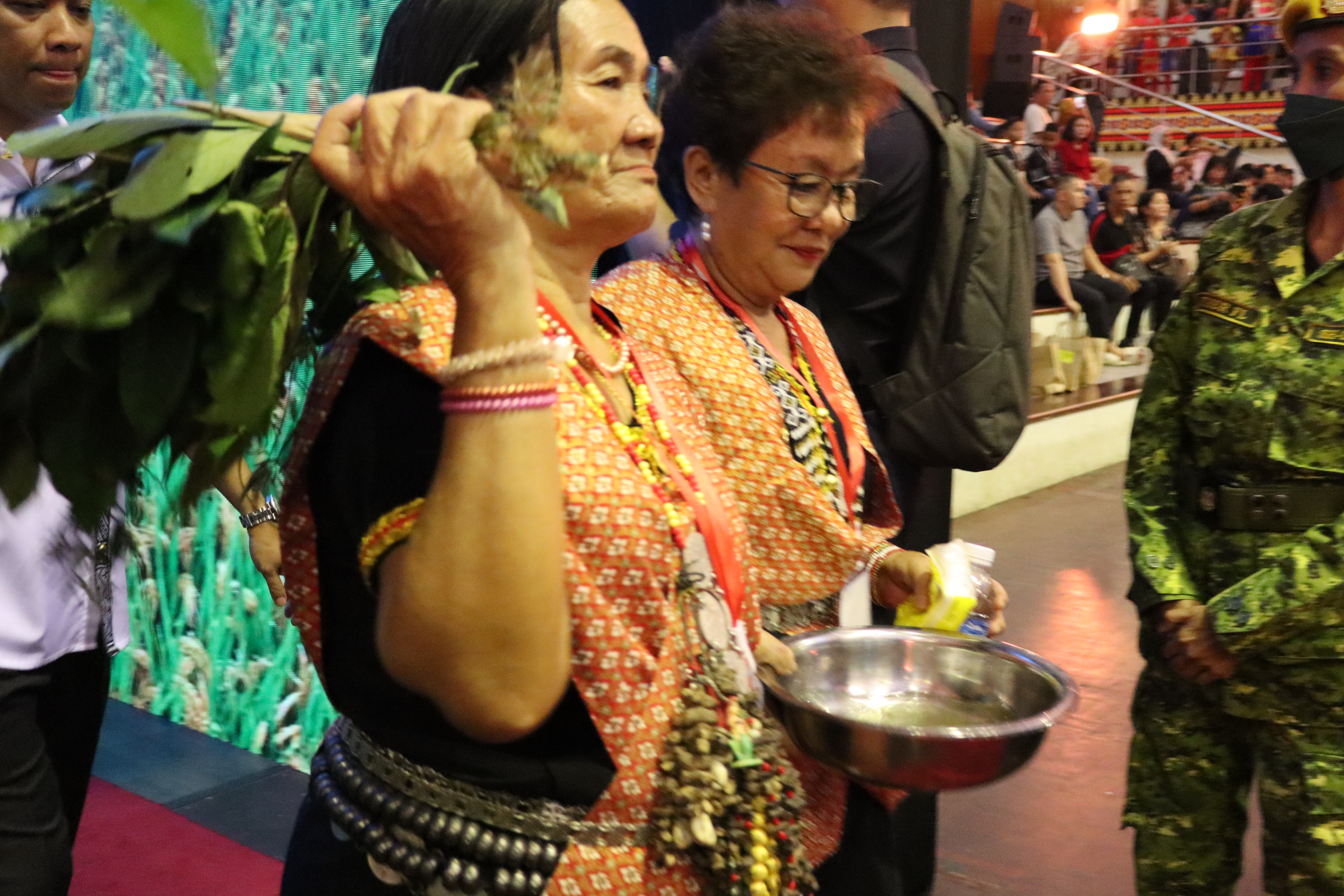
A bobohizan performing a ritual at the Hongkod Koisaan Hall

The bobohizan plays a pivotal role in the daily life of the Kadazan people before the advent of Christianity and Islam. Her role mainly involves appeasing the rice spirit in the magavau ritual that is held concurrently with the Kaamatan festival, appeasing the skulls in the magang ceremony, appeasing and offering sacrifices to the spirits of the sacred jars (different from the burial jar) and exorcising evil spirits. The bobohizan is not only the skilled ritual specialist, but also the custodian of traditions and customs, and her objectives are to help the people live their lives wisely and without complications.

The bobohizan in Penampang District are divided into three categories:

- the Potiang – Representing those in interior and hilly district of Penampang
- the Tanga'ah – Representing those in the midlands
- the Kadazan – Representing the areas commonly associated with paddy fields located near the city

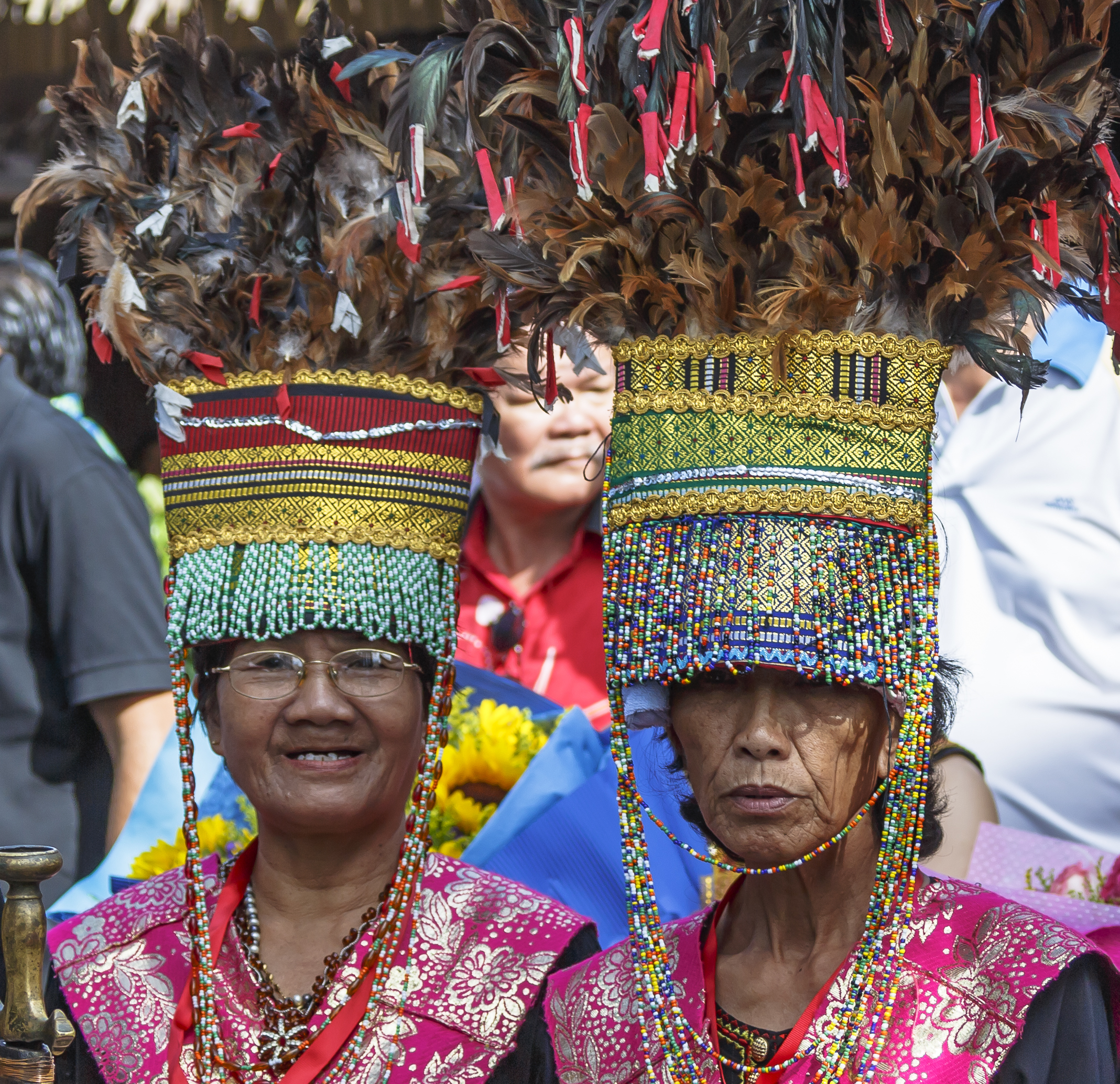
Bobohizan during the opening ceremony of the 2014 Kaamatan harvest festival at the KDCA Compound

The three different groups can be identified through their different methods of rituals that involve different materials, plants, and their potencies to heal the sick are discerned. In Tuaran District that is on the west coast of Sabah, the tantagas of the Lotud Dusun forms the foundation of the Lotud customary law, which is recognised by the Native Court of Sabah. The Lotud customary law is recognised through the ritual of mamanpang, a poetic ritual incantation called a rinait. The Lotud Dusun use the rinait in the sumalud healing ritual.

Due to the decline of many bobohizan and tantagas either owing to old age or conversion to Abrahamic religions, which are against shamanistic rituals, much of the essence of the bobohizan tradition is gone. Most of the recent generations of indigenous youth are uninterested in acquiring the ritual knowledge, and they do not believe in the significance of the bobohizan tradition. Since the 2000s, bobohizan rituals have been more often featured in traditional weddings and state-level festivals.

The Pogunon Community Museum in Penampang District contains a cemetery of bobohizan.

== See also ==
- Babaylan
- Kahuna
- Shamanism
