= Kaamatan =

Public holiday in Sabah and Labuan, Malaysia (30–31 May)

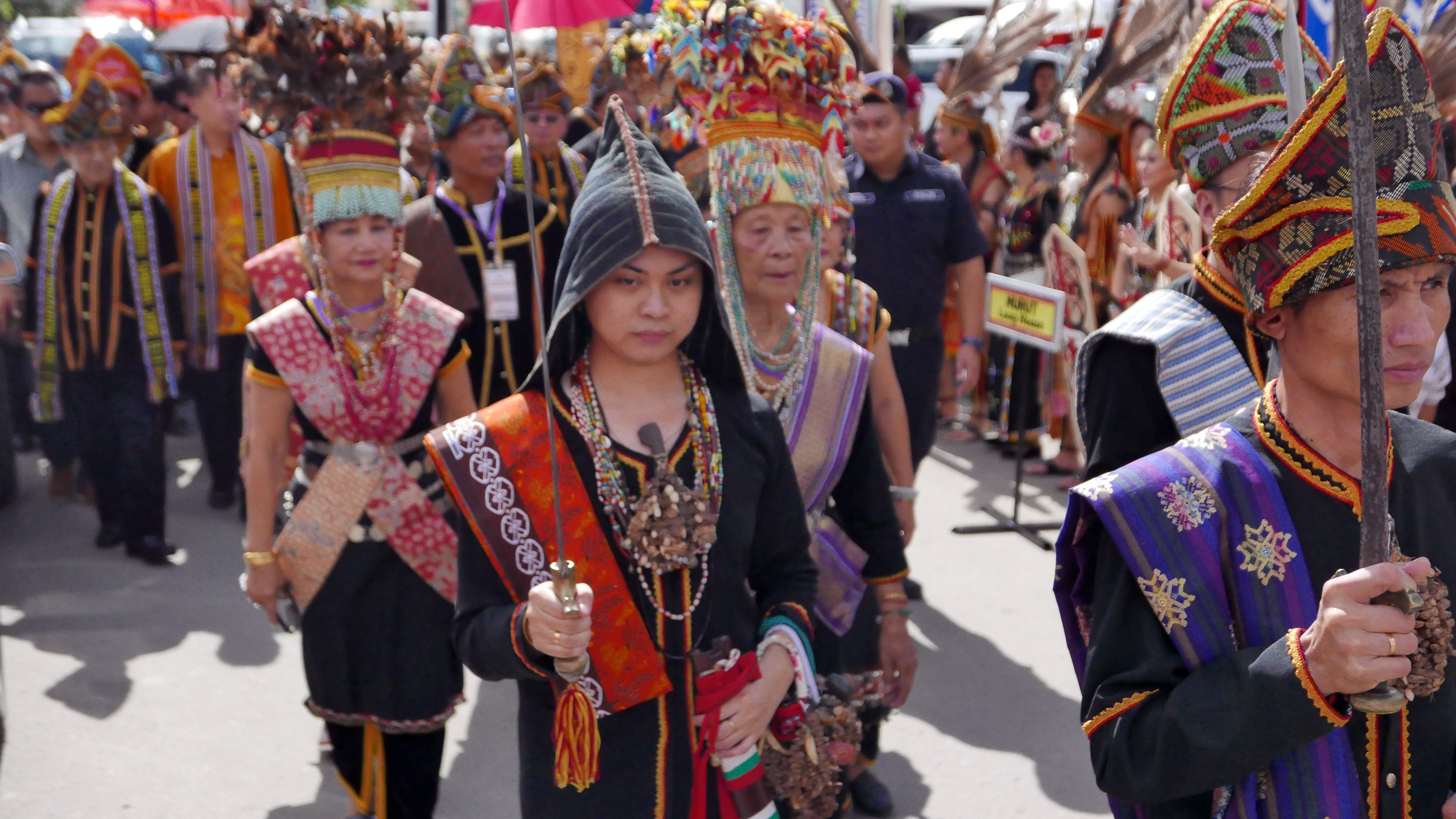
- A group of bobohizan and their apprentices leads the procession of guests of honour during Kaamatan Festival, at the Hongkod Koisaan KDCA, Penampang District, Sabah
- Official name: Kaamatan
- Also called: Tadau Kaamatan (Kadazan Dusun), Pesta Kaamatan (Malay)
- Observed by: Kadazan, Dusun, Murut (Kalimaran), Rungus, Lundayeh, Paitan, and Sino-Native
- Type: Ethnic, cultural
- Significance: Commemoration of Huminodun, the sacrificed Ponompuan — Daughter of Kinoingan (God)
- Celebrations: Family and other social gatherings, symbolic decoration
- Observances: Beauty pageants of Unduk Ngadau (female), Randawi Tavantang (male), Zandi Tavanus (married female), Runduk Tadau Dazanak (children), dance performance of Sumazau, Sugandoi singing competition, and other arts and crafts performances
- Begins: 30 May
- Ends: 31 May
- Date: May 30, May 31
- Duration: 2 days
- Frequency: Annual
- First time: 1960 in Crown colony of North Borneo
- Related to: Gawai Dayak, Kalimaran, Magahau

Kaamatan (Kadazan Dusun: Tadau Kaamatan; Malay: Pesta Kaamatan) is a form of harvest festival celebrated on 30 and 31 May annually in the state of Sabah in Malaysia.

It is observed annually on the month of May by the Kadazan, Dusun, Murut, Rungus, Lundayeh, Paitan, and Sino-Native ethnic groups as a commemoration for the sacrifice of Huminodun towards her community where various cultural and crafts performances were exhibited throughout the celebrations at the Hongkod Koisaan KDCA Hall in Penampang District with symbolic decoration followed by family and other social gatherings. The festival is also celebrated by Kadazan-Dusuns diaspora all around Malaysia, and abroad. (Note: The Kaamatan is also celebrated by overseas Sabahans in Australia, Canada, China, France, New Zealand, Norway, South Korea, Sweden, (the United Kingdom: England, and Scotland), and the United States.)

The festival is celebrated with various symbolic decoration and family and other social gatherings activities such as beauty pageants of Unduk Ngadau (female) and Randawi Tavantang (male), dance performance of Sumazau, Sugandoi singing competition, and other arts and crafts performances together with the availability of food stalls throughout the festivals.

== Etymology ==
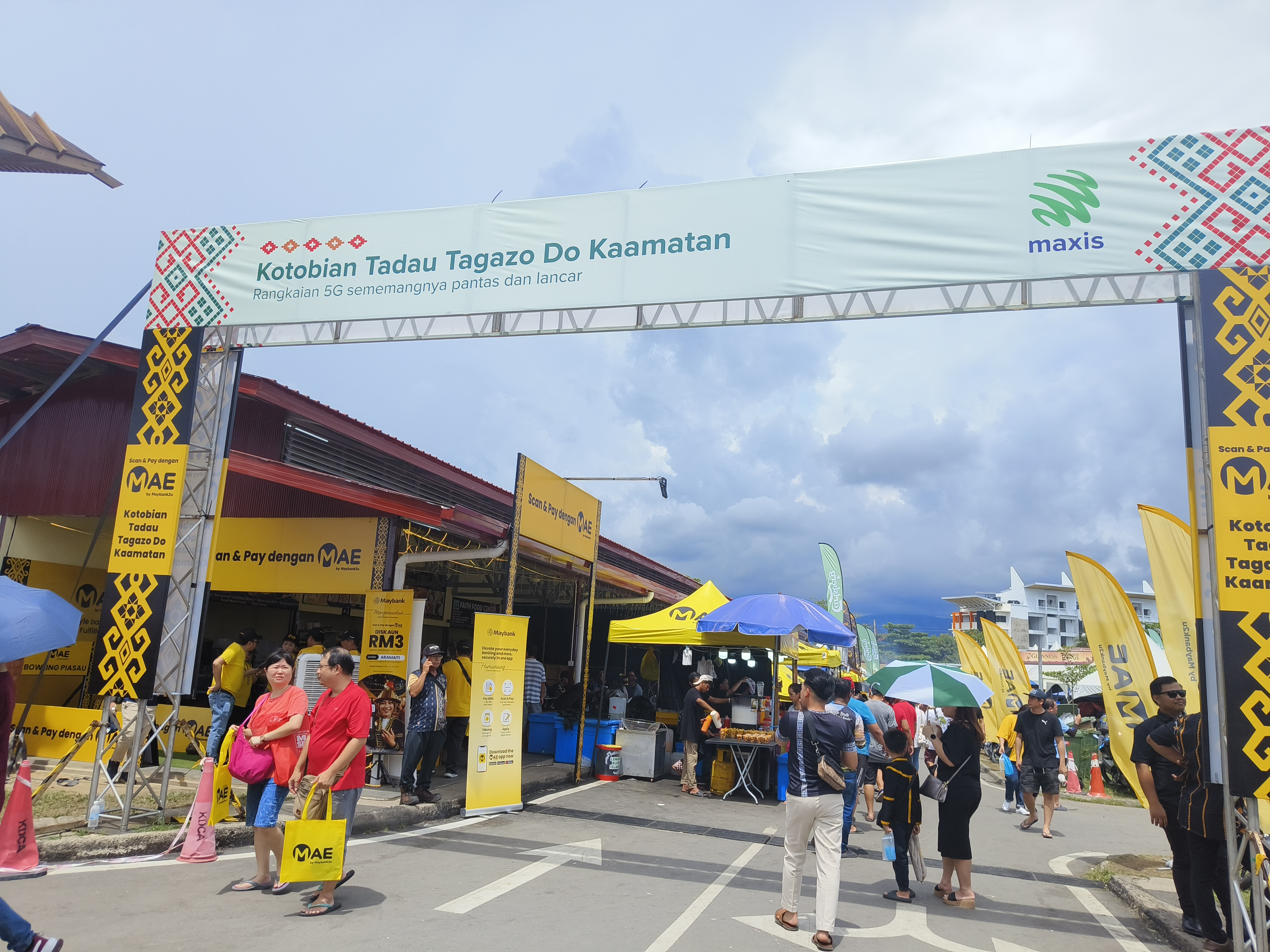
Kaamatan greeting banner at the food stall entrance gate during the festive season

The word Kaamatan carries the meaning of "harvest" in the Kadazan-Dusun languages, derived from the Kadazan-Dusun word "tomot". In the Murutic languages, their harvest festival is called the Kalimaran, although there are differences in the celebration that occurs from March and the Kaamatan that occurs in May. In the Rungus, Lundayeh, and Paitanic languages, the harvest festival is also referred to as Kaamatan and is celebrated in the same month of May, with the Rungus had observing the Kaamatan festival as part of their annual Magahau festival. During the Kaamatan, roadside billboard or banner greetings such as "Kotobian Tadau Tagazo do Kaamatan" (Kadazan) or "Kotobian Tadau Tagayo do Kaamatan" (Dusun), which translate to "Happy Harvest Festival" or "Wishing you a Happy Harvest Festival", are commonly found around Sabah during the festive season.

== History ==
During the "Conference of the District Chiefs and Native Chiefs" of the Crown colony of North Borneo in 1956, the native chief of the Interior Dusuns, OKK Sedomon Gunsanad Kina, proposed for the Kaamatan celebration to be declared and gazetted as an official public holiday in North Borneo. The British colonial authorities agreed on the proposal during the conference and on 9 May 1960, the celebration was gazetted by the British colonial authorities as an official public holiday for the region of North Borneo, under which it was announced during the "Annual Meeting of the Kadazan Association" under the then Chief Minister Donald Stephens. The first largest celebration was held in 1961 and was considered a special celebration since it was the first time since 1960 the festival public holiday was given the official status of recognition, where it is still remembered more clearly and with more enthusiasm than the 1963 independence celebration day.

== Symbolic significance of Kaamatan ==
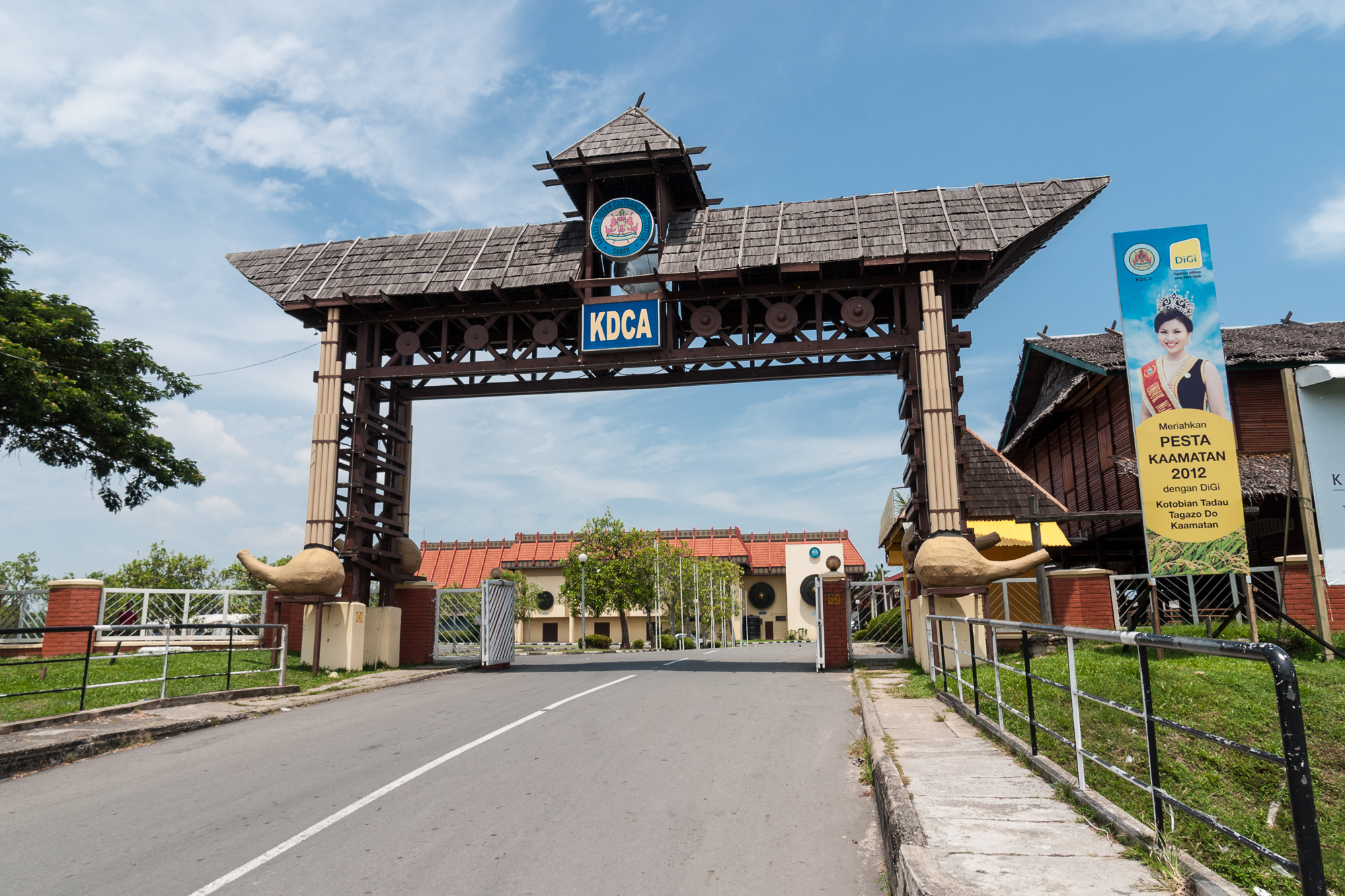
Hongkod Koisaan KDCA Unity Hall in Penampang District where the main annual celebration of Kaamatan are being held every year

According to a belief shared by all Dusun peoples, with some variations, the human race, created by the Supreme Being Kinoingan (also referred as Kinorohingan in different sources), experienced a severe famine at the beginning of time. Kinoingan's maiden daughter, Ponompuan (later named as Huminodun), sacrificed herself to provide food for humanity, resulting in the production of rice as the main staple, along with other essential crops such as coconut, tapioca, ginger, maize, and yams from different parts of her body. The myth further narrates that Huminodun was transformed into Bambaazon, a spirit emerging from a large jar containing the rice harvested by humans on the first day. An essential aspect of the myth includes Huminodun's instruction that, before starting the harvest, the father should take seven stalks of paddy (called toguruon), tie them to one end of a spliced bamboo stick, plant them at the centre of the field, and then store them in the rice container after the harvest. These seven stalks of paddy symbolise the spirit of rice, bambaazon (or bambarayon in interior dialects), which is believed to be responsible for abundant harvests.

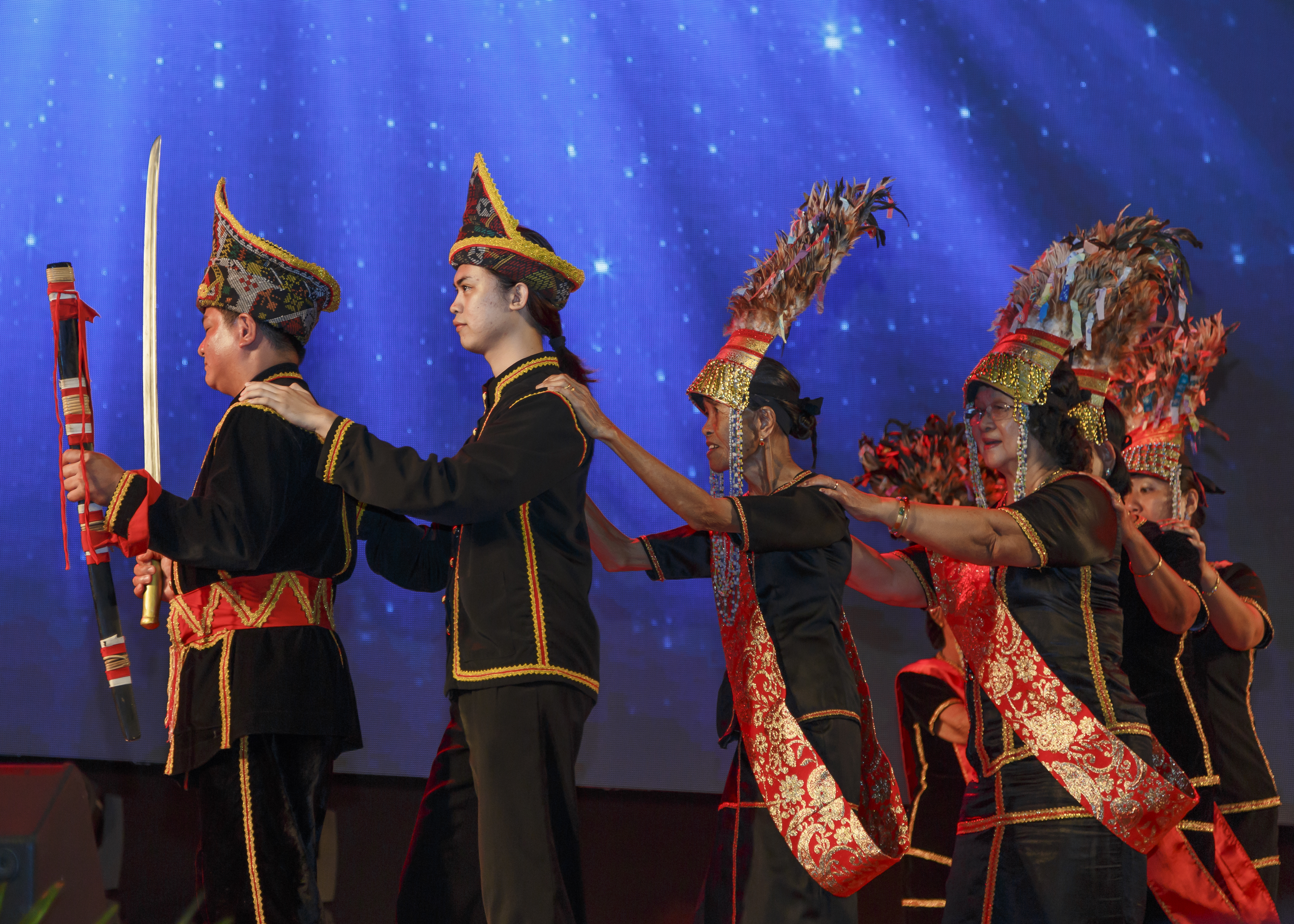
The bobohizan perform the magavau

This creation story played a central role in the traditional belief system of the Dusun peoples and formed the basis of numerous rituals performed annually during the rice harvest. The most significant of these rituals was the magavau ceremony, led by the ritual specialists known as bobohizan, to recover grains of rice that might have been lost or left in the field, carrying the Bambaazon with them and thereby preventing future crop shortages. Harvest-related rituals were the most important of the year, involving extensive celebration and feasting within villages. Another traditional ritual was the moginakan, which was costly and held during particularly good harvests, as well as for events like house reconstruction, childbirth, or recovery from illness.

== Celebration activities ==
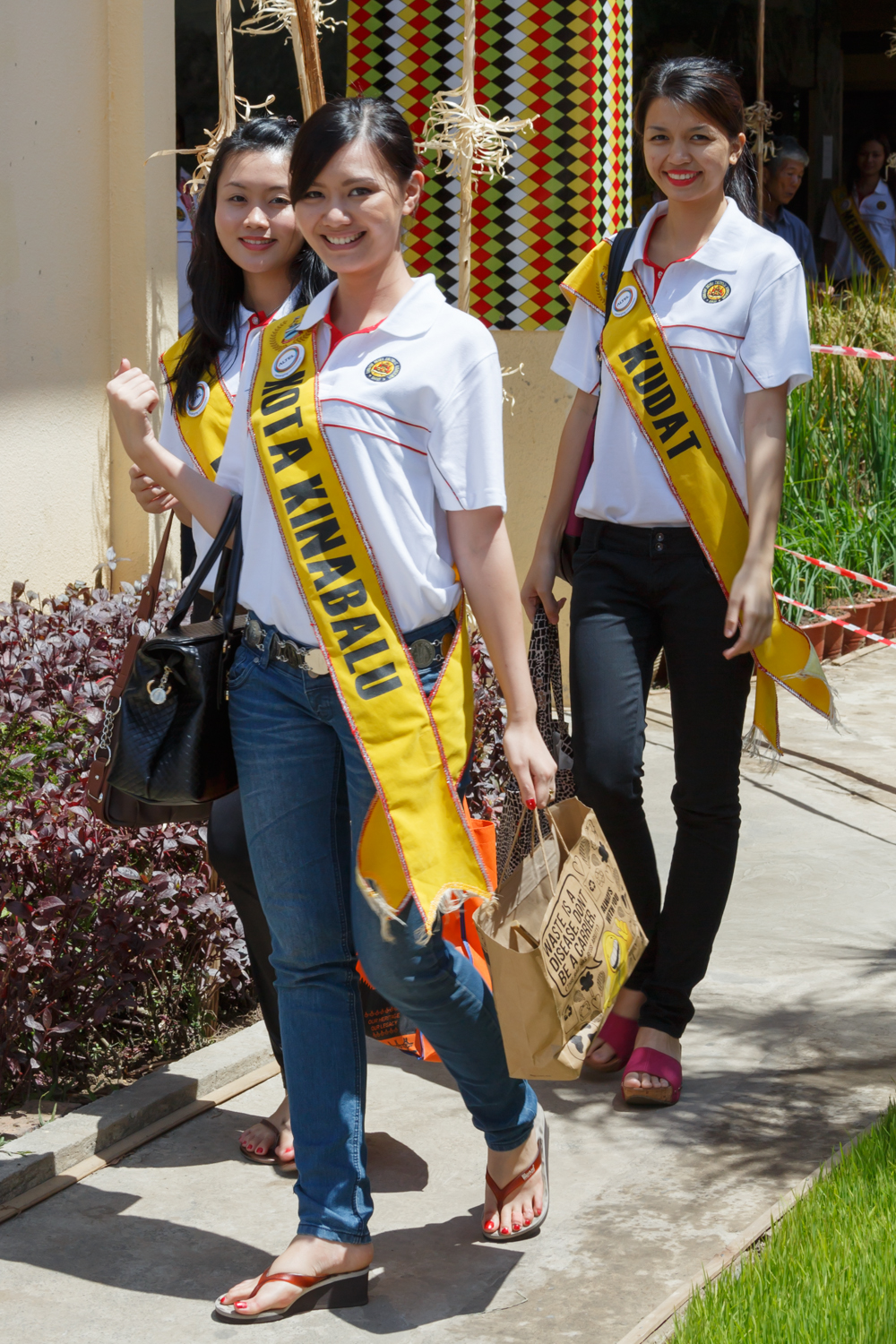
Sumandaks/Bazad-bazad (Kadazan-Dusun), Ralaa (Murut) and Sumuni/Suni (Rungus) from each of participating Sabah's districts and territory as well as KDCA branch representatives from West Malaysia will be participating in the annual beauty pageant of Unduk Ngadau during Kaamatan

Kaamatan is normally celebrated by the ethnic Kadazan-Dusuns, as well as by other related ethnic groups in the state such as Murut (named as Kalimaran), Rungus, Lundayeh, and Sino-Native, and the celebration lasts for the whole of the month of May, ending with a public holiday on a date selected by a priestess known as the bobohizan.

A female beauty pageant known as Unduk Ngadau and its recent male counterpart, Randawi Tavantang, will be held, and it ends the harvest festival with a newly crowned Unduk Ngadau and Mr Kaamatan in the annual host district, Penampang. There is also another pageants of Zandi Tavanus (married female), and Runduk Tadau Dazanak (children) held in different locations. The Harvest Festival comes under the ambit of what is known as Momolianism, the belief system and life philosophy of the Kadazan-Dusun. There is also a dance performance called the Sumazau along with various dance styles and performances displayed by each different Kadazan-Dusun sub-groups together with a singing contest called Sugandoi, a bodybuilding competition, and other arts and crafts performances. Competitions such as hitting the gong and folk sports such as: mipulos (arm wrestling), mipadsa (knuckle wrestling), monopuk (blow piping), momolositik (catapulting), and migayat lukug (tug of war) have also become one of the main events in this festival.

Popular drinks during the festival are bahar, lihing/kinomol, montoku/talak, and siopon/tapai/tumpung (rice wine), which is a traditional alcoholic drink. Tapai is drunk from a small bamboo vessel known as a sumbiling or from special glasses called singgarung, while montoku is drunk using modern glasses or the sinompuru and served in both Kaamatan and wedding ceremonies, likewise both made from bamboo.

Celebrations during Kaamatan
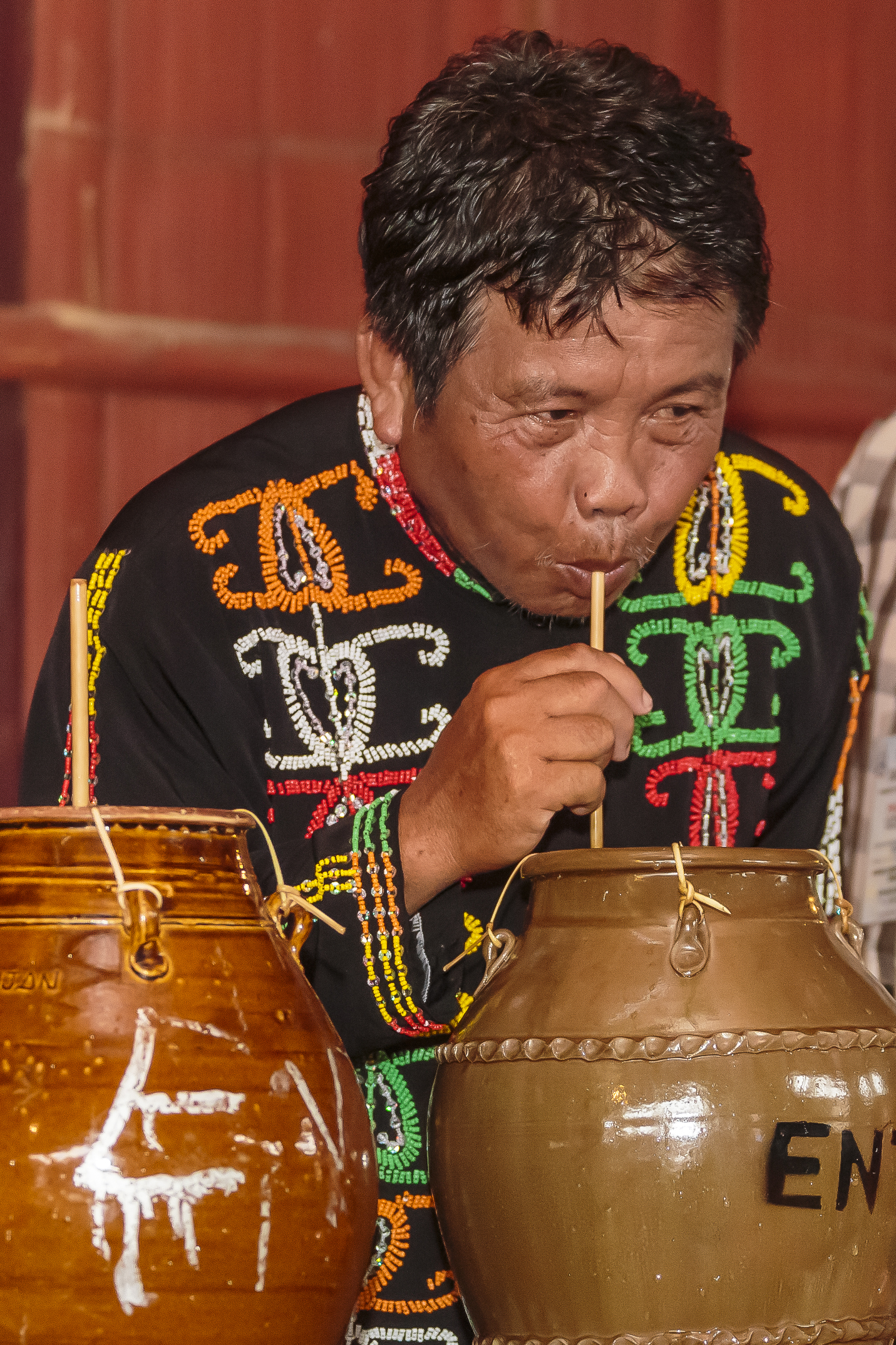
A Dusun man in traditional clothing drinking the tapai with a straw from a jar during Kaamatan

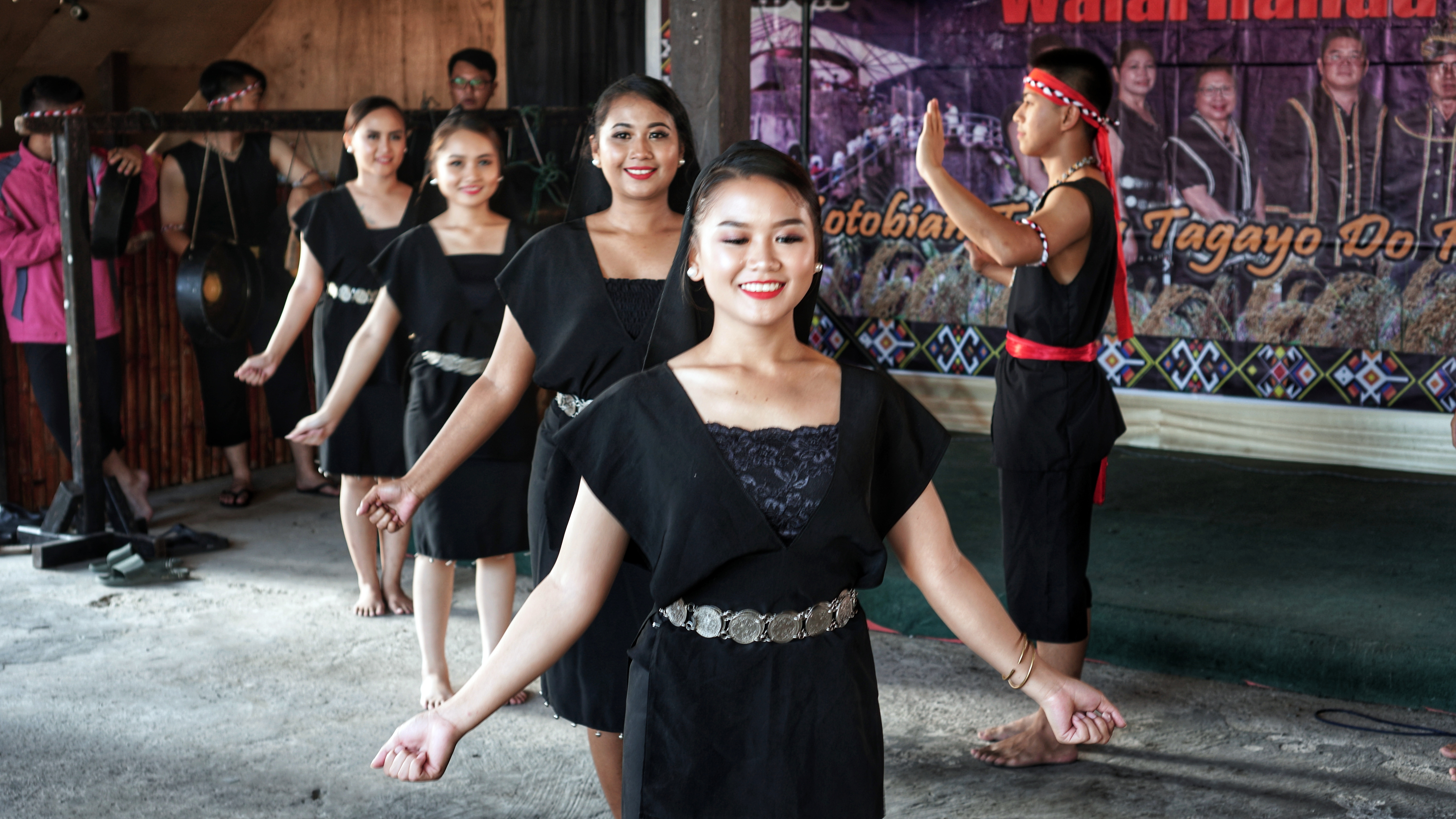
A cultural group performs during Kaamatan Festival

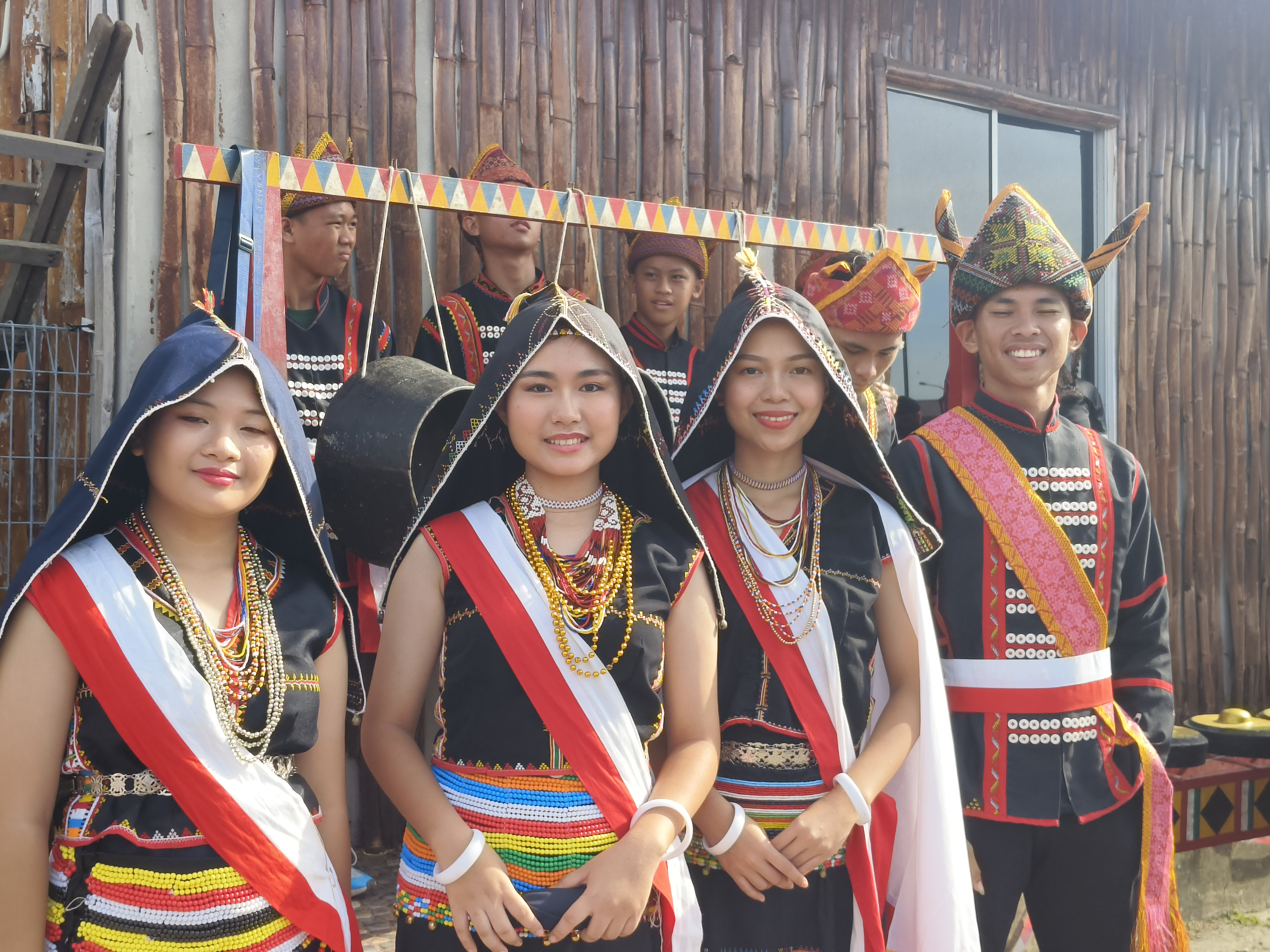
Tobilung Dusun in their traditional dress during Kaamatan

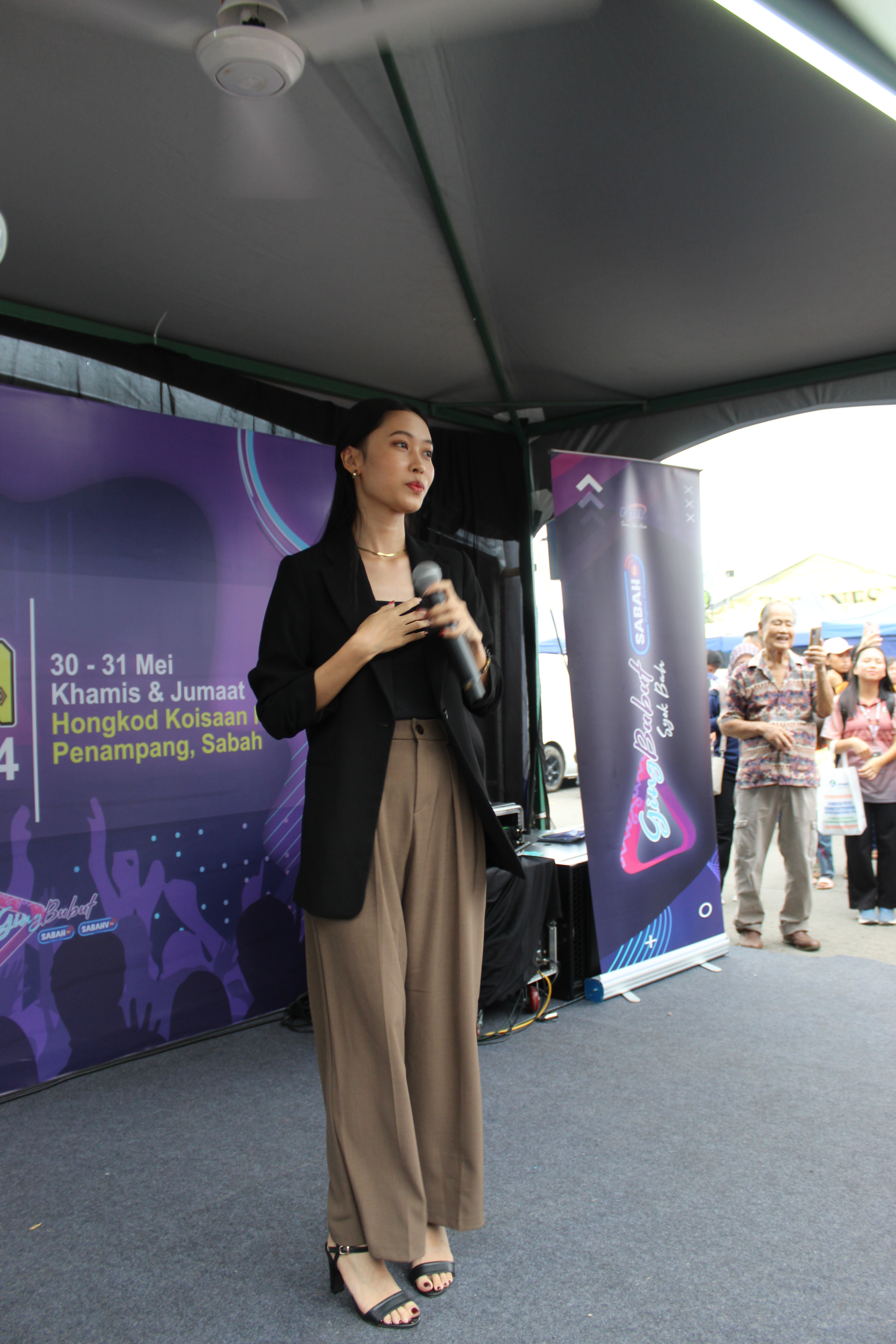
Singing during Kaamatan

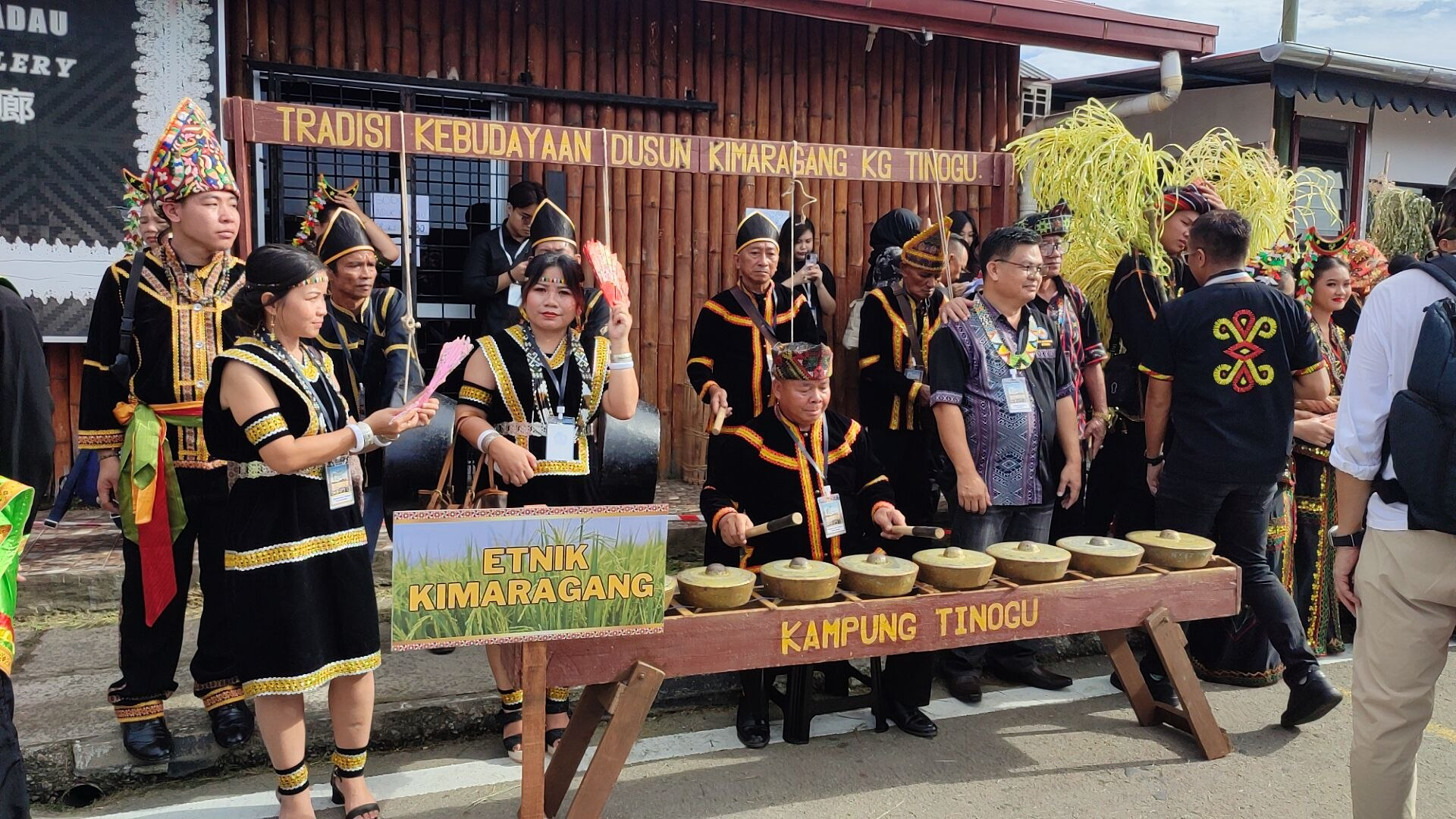
Musical performance by the Kimaragang Dusun

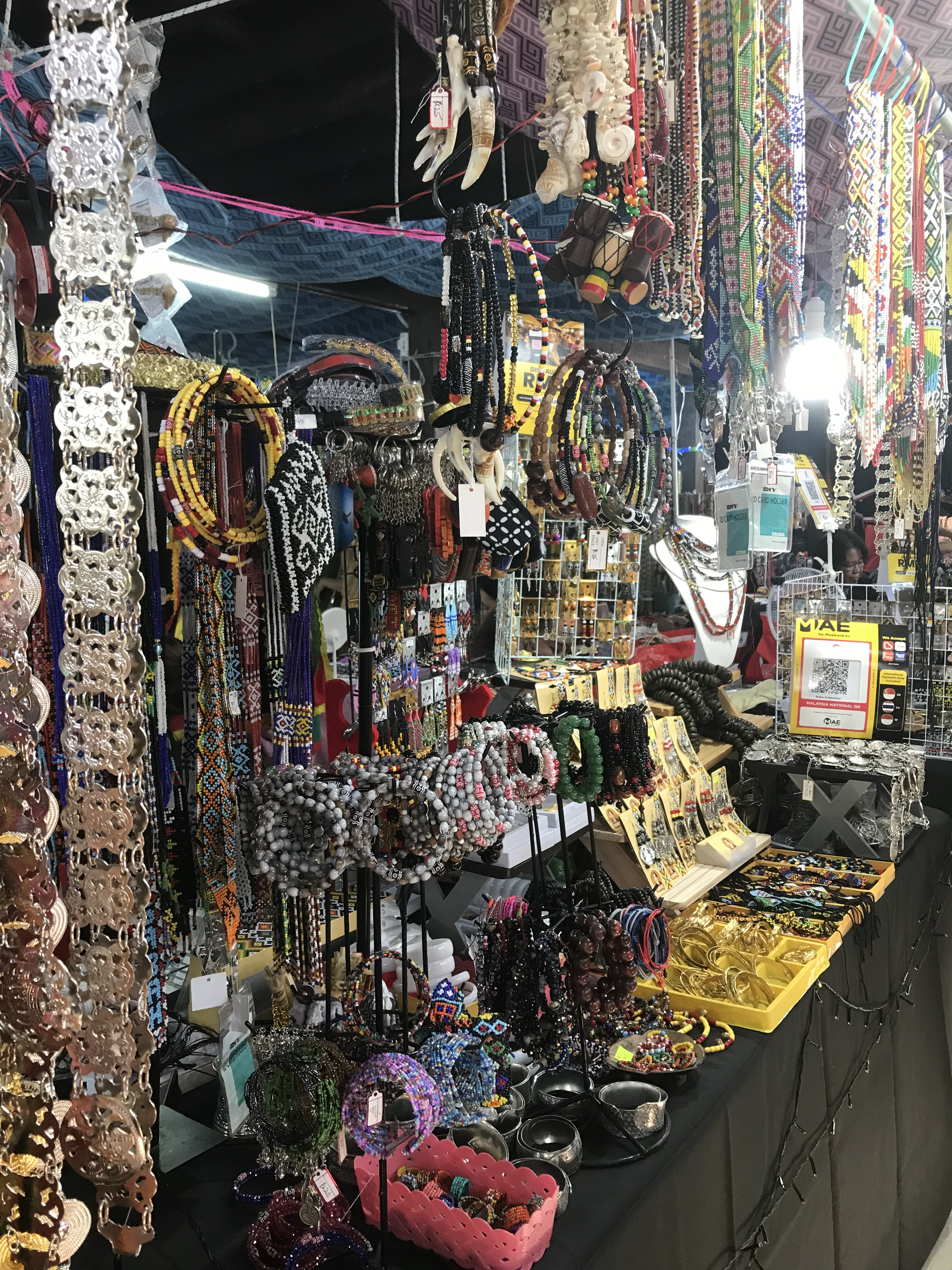
Variety of indigenous accessories sold during Kaamatan

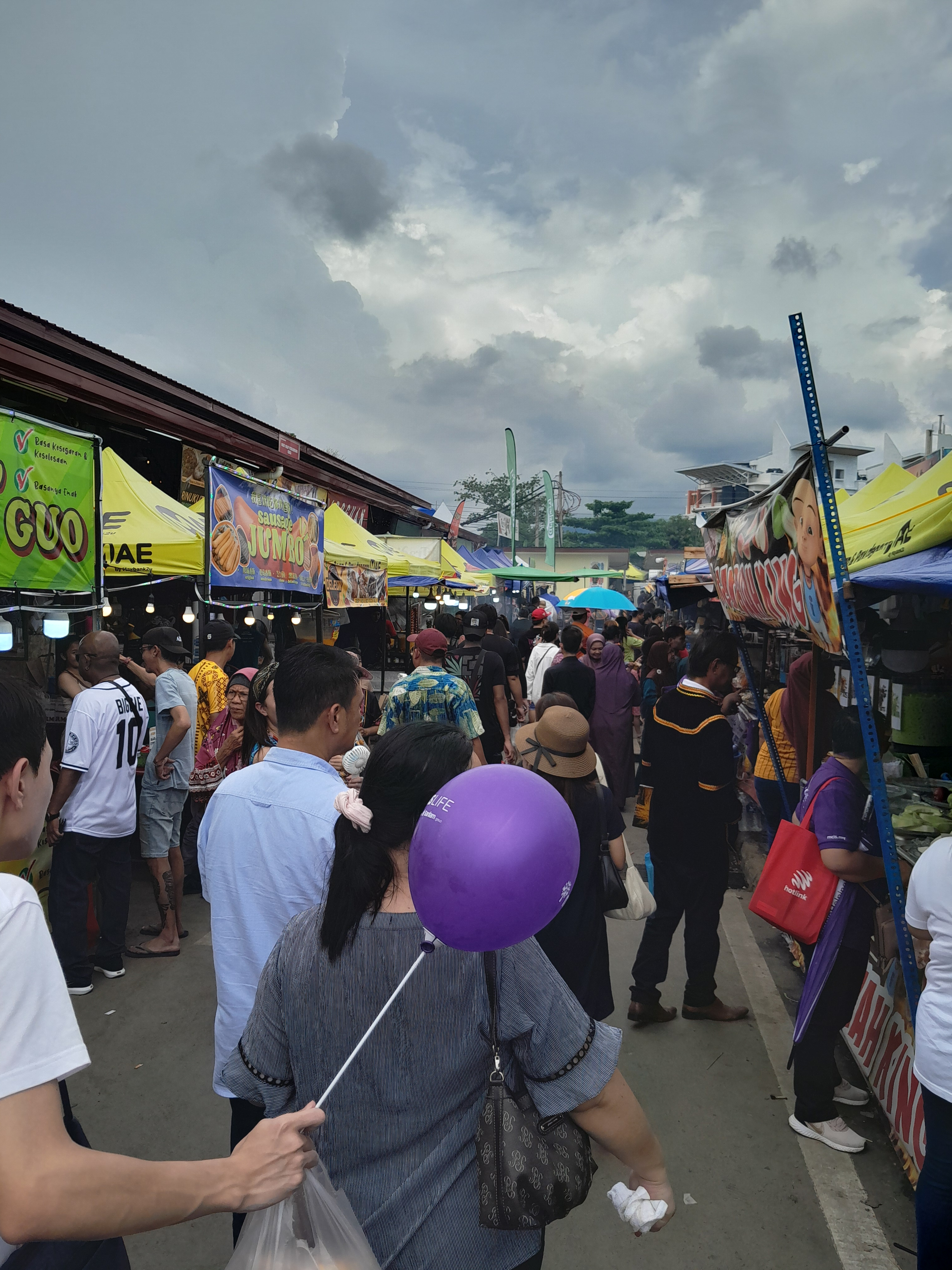
Various food stalls set-up for visitors during the Kaamatan celebration at KDCA

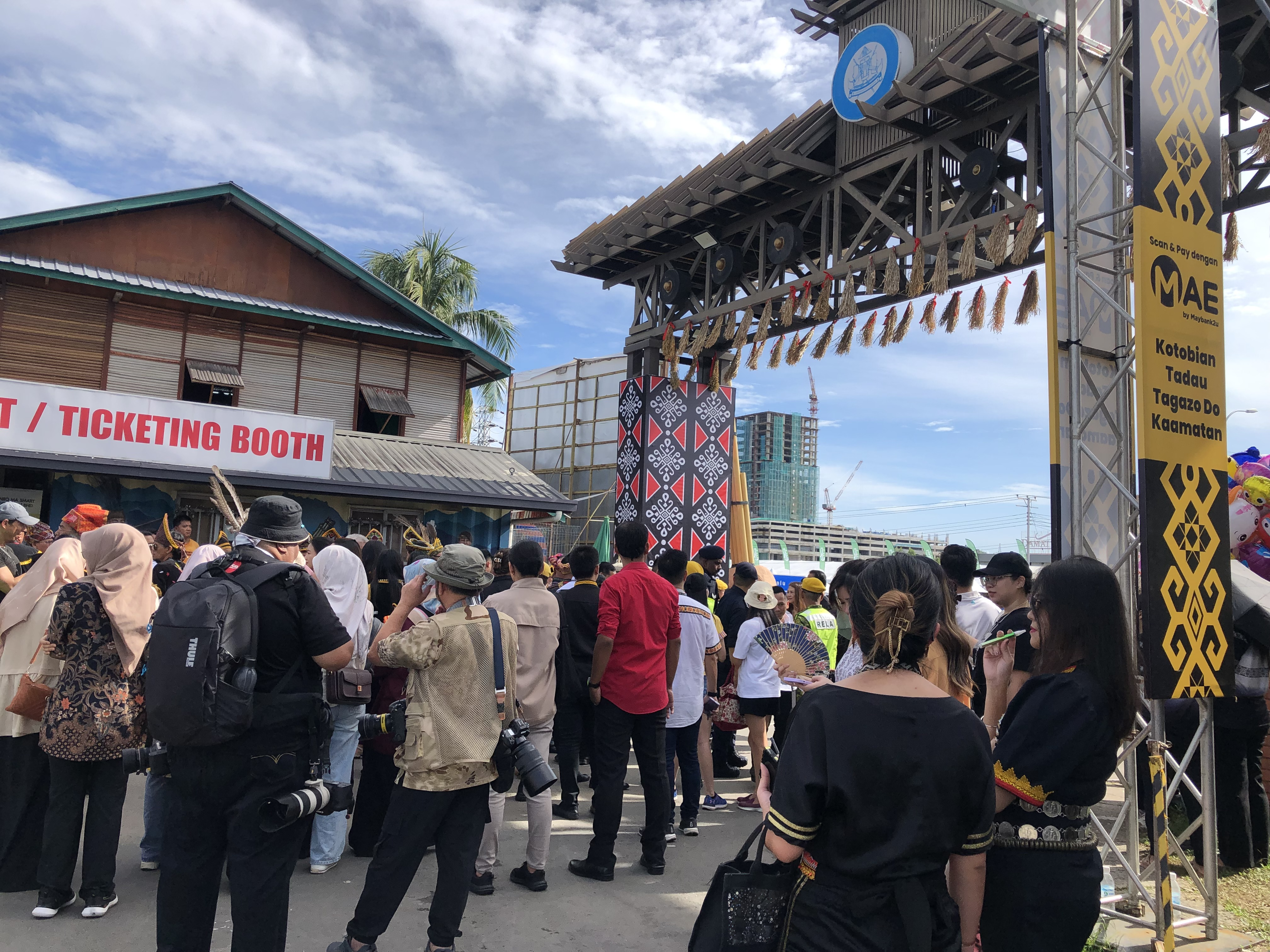
Visitors gathering at the KDCA entrance

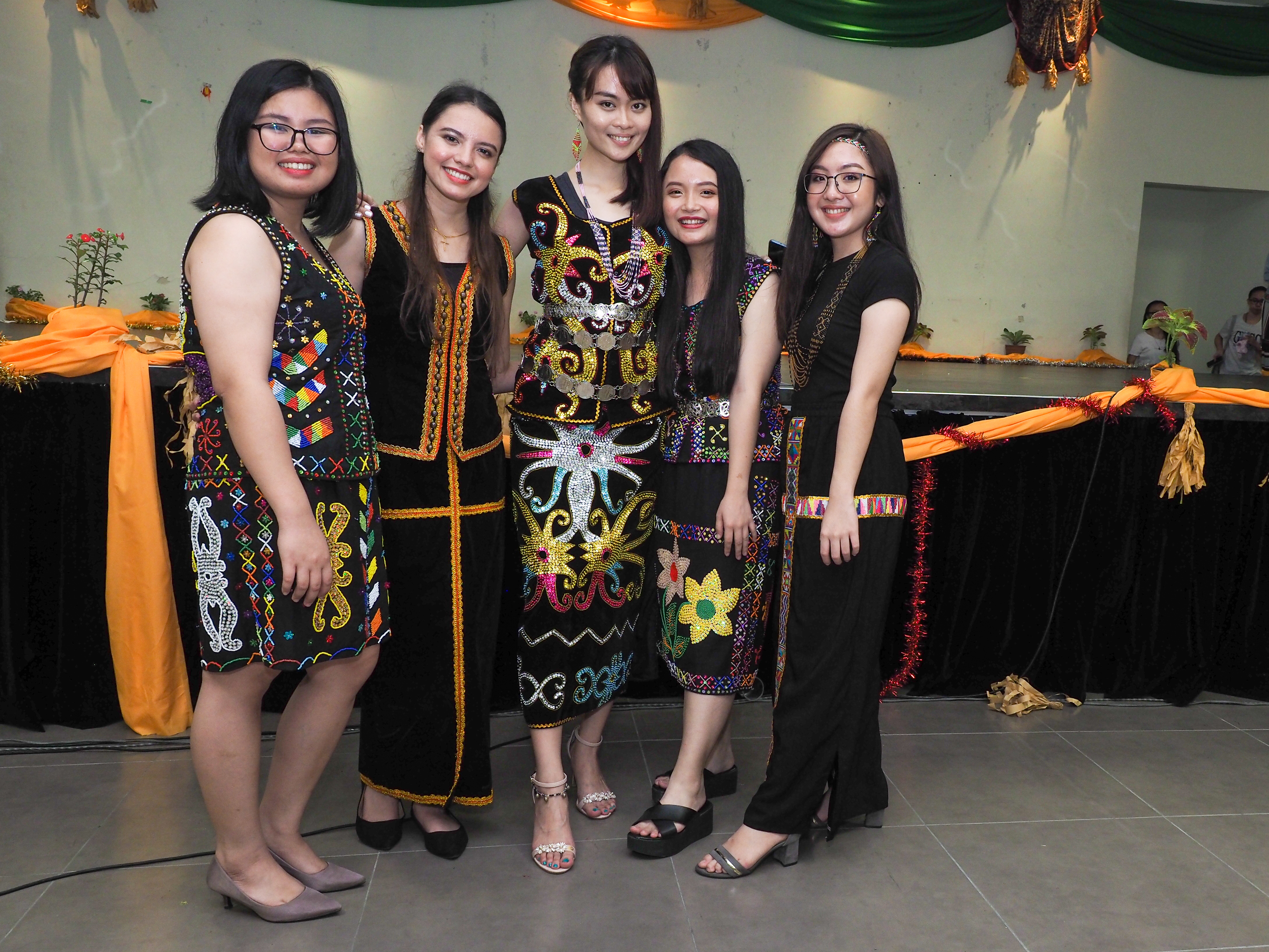
A joint Gawai-Kaamatan celebration at St. Ignatius Catholic Church, Petaling Jaya in West Malaysia by both Sarawak and Sabah indigenous communities.
From left: Orang Ulu, Kadazan, Kenyah, Murut and Rungus females

== See also ==
- List of harvest festivals
- Kadazandusun Cultural Association
- Gawai Dayak
