= Traditional Sabahan religions =

Belief systems of Sabahan native peoples

Momolianism is a traditional belief system of the Kadazan-Dusun, Murut and Rungus people of Sabah, Malaysia. It is regarded a divine set of rules of worship, behaviour and mode of life with the indigenous Kadazan-Dusuns have ingeniously fitted their religious values system into their social life and made it into local traditional laws known as Adat.

== Origin ==
Momolianism has its origins in the first ancestors' interaction with the natural and spiritual environment at Nunuk Ragang, the legendary ancestral home of the Kadazan-Dusun, as well as the Rungus. This belief system was an integral part of the Kadazan-Dusuns life before the advent of organised religion, with mother nature are regarded as having its own life, from which all living beings draw life and returning it back again with all forms of life and existence are part of a mystical whole, whose body nature is, and Kinoingan (God) (also referred as Kinorohingan in different sources). Central to Momolianism is the belief that the Kadazan-Dusun ethnics live in an environment consisting of the "seen material world" (Pomogunan Tulun) and the "unseen spirit world" (Pomogunan Tosundu). Followers believed that it was very important to ensure continuity of the balance and order between the natural and spirit environment, with some scholars would equate this to animism.

== Basic beliefs ==
Momolianism states that land is a gift from the creator, the earth is a centre of the universe and that the land connects them to the past, present and future. This system of belief, inherited from their ancestors, was passed down through the bobohizan (Kadazan term), or bobolian (Dusun term), priestesses.

=== Deities ===
Momolianism generally believes that deities Kinoingan and Suminundu have their complementary roles in the creation of the world and all its contents. However, according to the late former Deputy Chief Minister of Sabah, Herman Luping, the name of the creator God in Kadazan-Dusun is Minamangun, whereas Kinoingan in this sense was introduced by Catholic missionaries. To him as according to the story by the Tangaah of Penampang, (Note: The "Tangaah Kadazan" of Penampang and Papar is a Kadazan-Dusun tribe who resist the "Dusun term" once coined by early Chinese and Brunei overlords due to a previous dark history related to the "Tagahas Dusun" for betrayals during a conflict by Mat Salleh in Tambunan. Similarly, the Lotud Dusun of Tuaran were also against the term of "Kadazan" to referring the Tangaah of Penampang and Papar until the problem of the "Kadazan" and "Dusun" term were settled with the recognition of each other.) Kinoingan refers to the legendary first male to exist alongside his female counterpart Suminundu.

=== Communications with the spirit world ===
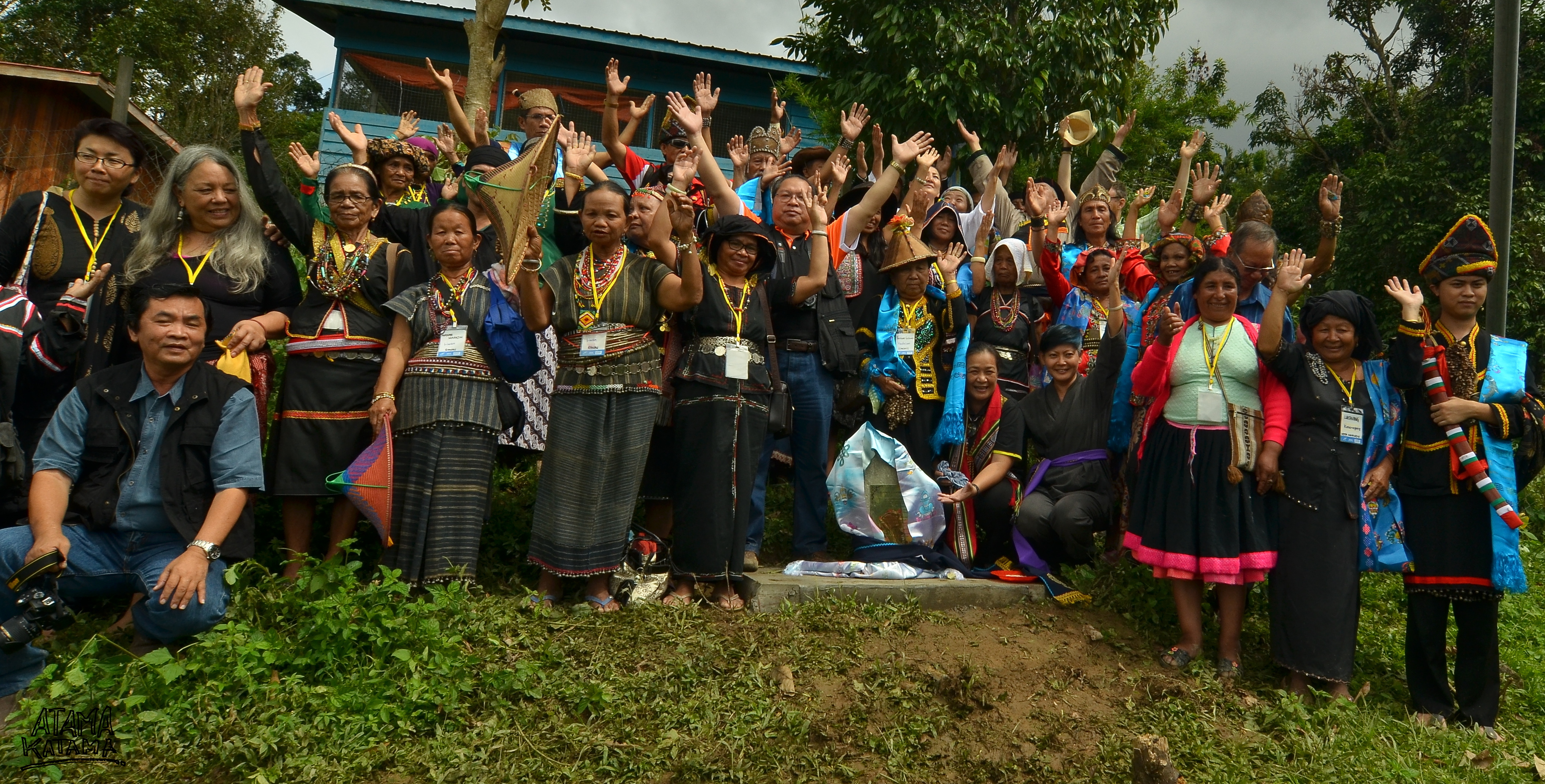
Momolian priests and priestesses together with guardians of the sacred mountain pose at "International Sacred Mountain Guardian Summit Commemorative Accord Stone" in November 2015

In momolianism, the inhabitants of the spirit world and the riniba (human) world are always trying to communicate with each other. To facilitate communication, the bobolian was created. The bobolian is a woman with special gifts and abilities that allow her to communicate with their counterparts in the spirit world. These spirit world counterparts are called the susukuon or "reference spirit being". The ability for bobolians and susukuon to communicate with each other is described as kih gimbaran or osundu (in possession of spiritual power). When the community faces crisis, the bobolian provides it with spiritual guidance from the susukuon.

To initiate communication with the susukuon, a bobolian has to first provide the spirit with gifts. These gifts include prepared foods (boiled chicken flesh and egg) and drink (fermented sweet tapai/lihing). A susukuon can also contact ordinary people through their senses: hearing, sight, smell, touch and taste. For example, a person walking on the road might be warned by a susukuon of impending danger. This warning could take the form of a call of the lokiu bird (a woodpecker) or from a lontugi (giant millipede) sitting in the middle of the road. Thus warned, the person would turn around and go back. This practice called kokopio-on.

=== Crime and punishment ===
According to momolianism, the riniba world was created by Kinorohingan (god), the mighty spirit that lives in Libabou (heaven). Kinorohingan expects people to follow the pantang (rules) and adat (customs) with sins such as sumbang (marriage between family members), adultery, and monindaat (killing other people with black magic) should be avoided. These are violations of the balance between the riniba and spiritual worlds. Based on Momolian beliefs, bad things will happen to their community if they fail to punish an offender with Kinorohingan will instead punish everyone with infectious disease, natural disasters and crop failures.

To prevent this collective punishment, the village/clan/tribe chief (molohingon) will punish the wrongdoer. The chief first consults with the diwato (spirit-form messenger of Kinorohingan), using the bobolian as a moderator. A minor offence would require performance of a sogit such as when a man clears a plot of land without first asking a bobolian to perform the Adat Mansalud, to "ask permission" from the woods spirit. To regain favour with the spirit world and the community, he must offer sogit with animal sacrifices which are offered to the spirits to maintain peace. A major offence would require the person to exile or being tied in a raft to set adrift in the river.

=== Salvation ===
Momolianism describes a salvation experience that ensured the survival of the Kadazan-Dusun race, which were once facing extinction due to a disastrous famine. Huminodun, a human maiden daughter of Kinoingan and his wife Suminundu, allowed herself to be sacrificed. Her body parts then dispersed over the earth to later sprout as food plants which subsequently saving her people. As a result, Huminodun's sacrifice is celebrated in the annual Tadau Kaamatan festival every year.

=== The dead ===
In Momolianism, the dead pass on to another realm of life. They move to the new home Nabahu or Akinabalu (from the word "aki" meaning "old man"), later officially named Mount Kinabalu. The remains should be buried as soon as possible (also referred to as lisok, or hide), to prevent foreign spirit invasion. The spirit of the deceased (referred to as "koduduo" or "your second") is sent away from the coffin by vigorously hitting of the floor. On the seventh day after burial, the family holds a ceremonial popouli ("to invite home") to allow for the koduduo to "re-enter the earthly home and retrieve any forgotten belongings". This ceremony includes momisok or switching off lights so as not to scare off the koduduo. The Kadazan people's role in this ceremony is to ensure that the koduduo is properly sent off.

== Traditional healing ==
Momolianism is closely tied to traditional healing because all the bobolians are traditional healers. The process of healing in Momolianism is referred to as "manampasi" which is somewhat akin to salvation, only that it involves a process of ritual negotiation with susukuon to temporarily reject the koduduo's (spirit) entry to Nabahu.

== Evolution of Momolianism ==
Momolianism began as a belief system to guide the early small community of settlers life interactions with the highly forested natural environment of Nunuk Ragang. As the environment changed due to human exploitation, the belief system also underwent changes to accommodate to new reality of community life.

Forest Phase

The need to evade a crisis of overpopulation at site and over exploitation of the forest resources at Nunuk Ragang led to the introduction of the Minorit (tiny spiritual beings) concept so as to spur migration and dispersal. The bobolians' advice to the Nunuk Ragang warrior leaderships to initiate the abandonment of Nunuk Ragang was fully complied with by the people leading to the migration up the Liwagu Kogibangan (left fork) and the Liwagu Kowananan (also spelled Kawananan) (right fork) rivers. This point to the strong influence of Momolianism in ensuring continued existence and population growth of the Kadazan-Dusun people.

Paddy Cultivation Phase

After the introduction of paddy planting, the community was subjected to another major crisis involving severe crop failure and consequent famine. This led to the introduction of concept of worship of Kinorohingan and Huminodun (Traditional Tadau Kaamatan festival). This phase of evolution of Momolianism could not have happened at Nunuk Ragang. The Nunuk Ragang inhabitants were not wet paddy planters, but practice vegeculture such as cultivating and propagating the yams, sweet potato and cassava using suckers and cuttings. The Rumanau people ethnic group were the first Kadazan-Dusun to acquire the skill of wet paddy planting. Hence their name "Rumanau" which means "one who cultivate wet paddy".

The Gusi Cult Phase

Worship of jars began among the Tuaran Dusuns and Papar Kadazans.

The Guritom Cult Phase

Veneration of skulls at Sunsuron. This phase developed in tandem with the advent of the headhunting phase among the Kadazan-Dusun. At Nunuk Ragang the Kadazan-Dusun families, being small community, were at peace with one another and the Guritom was non-existent. The Guritom (house of skulls) at Sunsuron, Tambunan had been removed and the skulls transferred to the Sabah Museum. Another site at Sogindai of Ranau was previously being used as a Guritom. The Guritom Phase came about as a result of the absence of the law and as an attempt at presenting visual warning to any party deviating from the norm in relationship among the descendants of the Nunuk Ragang settlers.

The Syncretistic Phase

The coming of European influence had a major impact on Momolianism. The largely tolerant Catholic religion, allowed for dual practice of Momolianism and Christian faith to co-exist side by side.
