= KDCA Compound =

Kadazan Dusun Cultural Association Compound
- Koiyonon Pitimungan Koubasanan do Kadazan Dusun
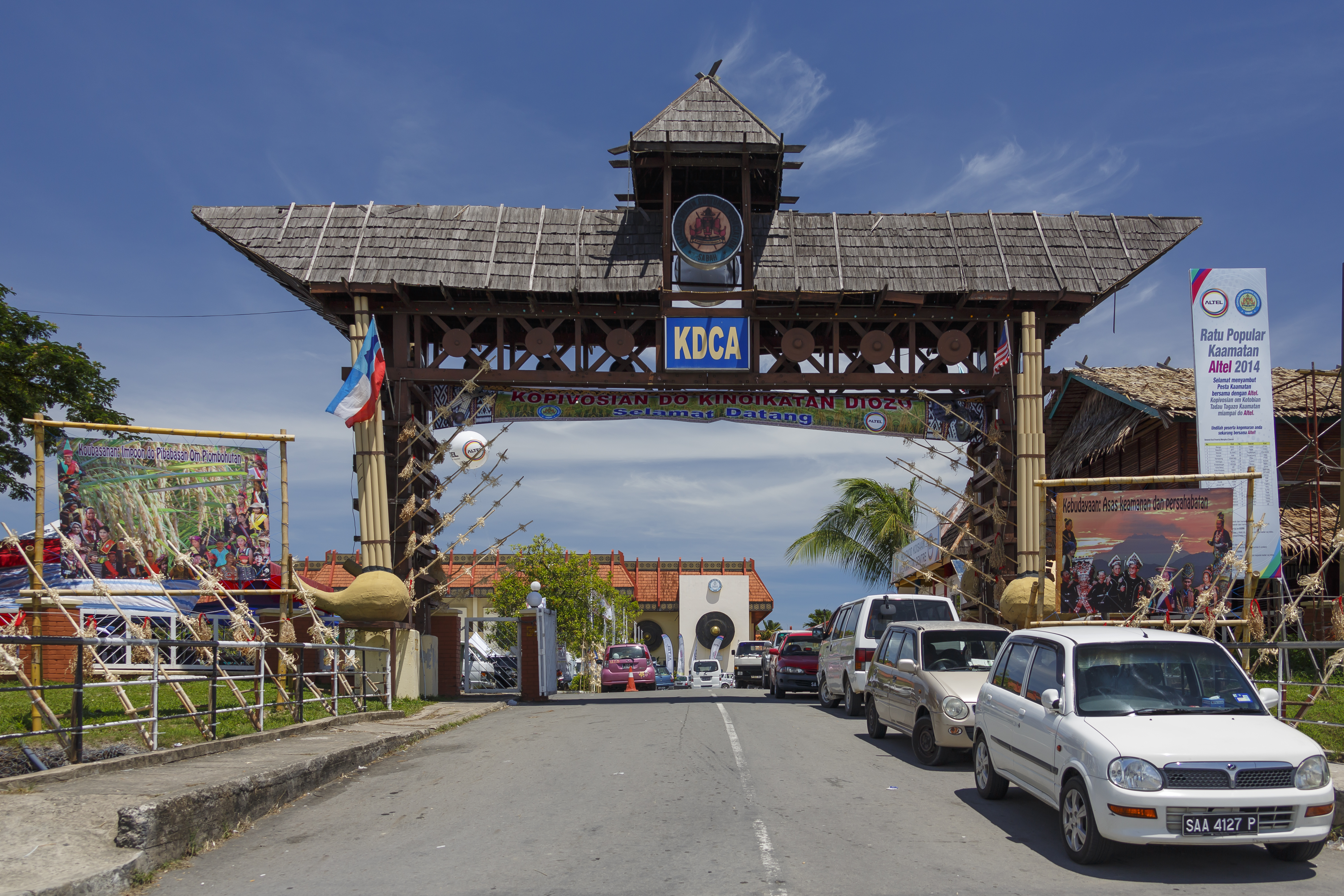
- KDCA Compound gate pictured in 2014

General information
- Architectural style: Traditional indigenous architecture
- Location: KM 8 (Mile 4.5), Old Penampang Road off Nosoob Hungab Road, P.O. Box 907, Kampung Sindanan/Bahang, 89507 Penampang, Sabah, Malaysia
- Coordinates: 5°55′23.723″N 116°5′25.436″E
- Opened: 1989 (Note: The Koisaan Cultural Village (KCV) which has been the main venue of the annual Kaamatan festival since 1989, showcases and preserves the rich cultural heritage of the multi-tribal Kadazan-Dusun people.)

Website
- kdca.org.my

KDCA Compound (Kadazan Dusun: Koiyonon do KDCA, Standard Malay: Pekarangan KDCA), also known by its full name of Kadazan Dusun Cultural Association Compound (Kadazan Dusun: Koiyonon Pitimungan Koubasanan do Kadazan Dusun; Standard Malay: Pekarangan Persatuan Kebudayaan Kadazan Dusun), is the cultural exhibition compound site of the Kadazan and Dusun ethnics that form the larger Kadazan-Dusuns located in Penampang District of Sabah, Malaysia. Operated by the Kadazan Dusun Cultural Association (KDCA), the site features an ethnic village with various traditional ethnic houses related to the Kadazan-Dusun groups, a main hall, and event spaces. It serves as the central location for preserving and celebrating Sabah's indigenous cultures, especially during events like the state's main cultural celebration of the Kaamatan festival.

== History ==
The KDCA Compound history traced its origin from the establishment of the Kadazan Society of Penampang, Crown Colony of North Borneo in 1953. In 1966, nearly three years after the establishment of the Malaysian federation, the Kadazan Cultural Association (KCA) was formed through the initiative of Sabah's first Kadazan Chief Minister, Donald Stephens. Faced with an identity dispute with the entire Dusun community over the ethnic term, the following year, in 1967, the United Sabah Dusun Association (USDA) was formed. Both the KCA and USDA were then merged into a single entity called the Kadazan Dusun Cultural Association (KDCA) in 1989 under Chief Minister Joseph Pairin Kitingan to unite both the Kadazan and Dusun peoples, since it is acknowledged that the entire tribes and sub-tribes of both ethnic groups come from the similar Dusunic identity. Since then, the KDCA Compound was constructed to hold major events related to both of the ethnic groups as well as other related indigenous groups of the Kadazan-Dusuns.

== Features ==
=== Hongkod Koisaan Hall ===
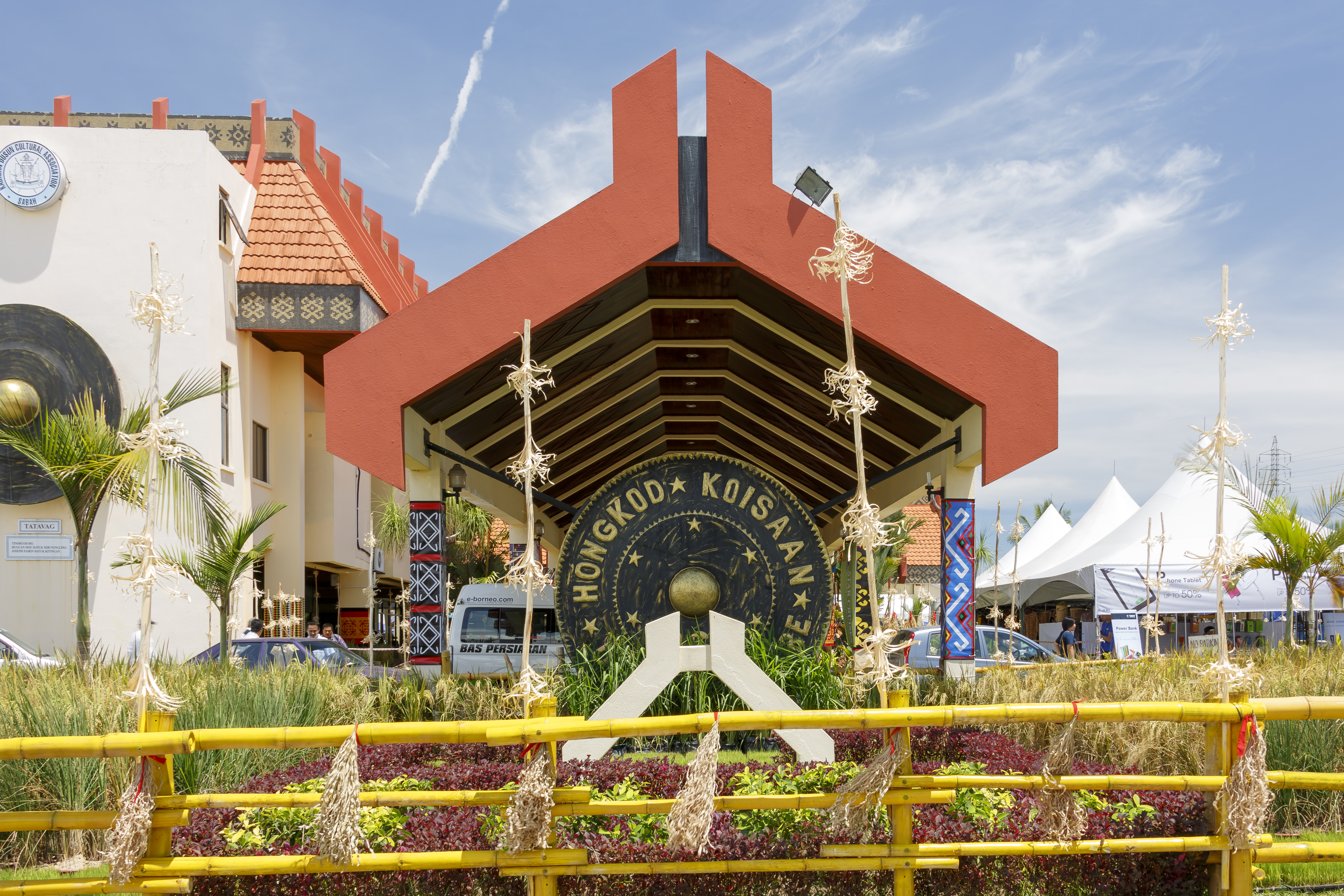
The Hongkod Koisaan Unity Hall front view

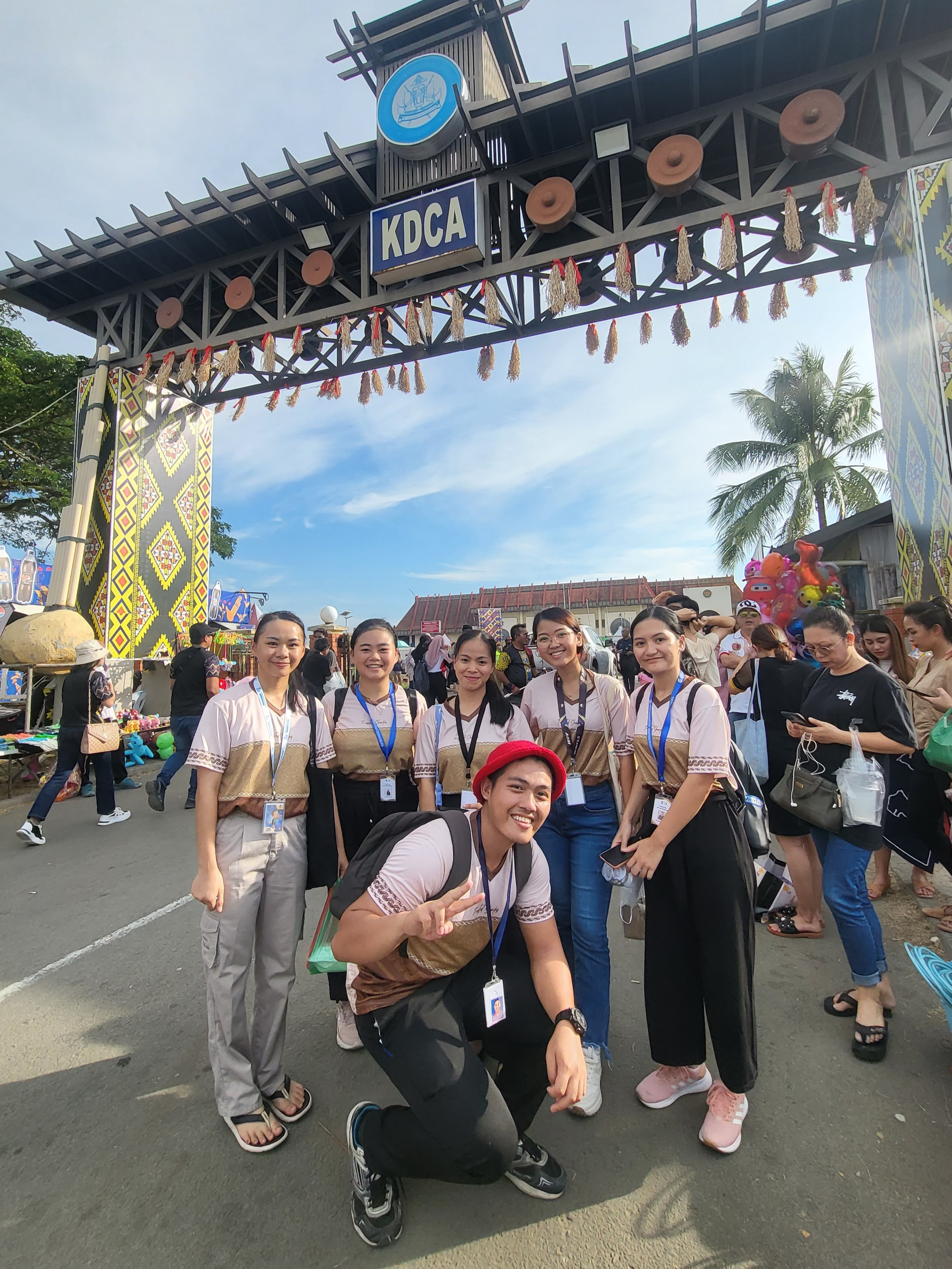
The gate to KDCA pictured in 2023 during the Kaamatan

The Place of Unity Hall (Kadazan Dusun: Hongkod Koisaan) serves as the area where the annual Kaamatan events of the Unduk Ngadau and formerly the Mr. Kaamatan pageants are being held, for the male paegeant is nowadays being held at the National Department for Culture and Arts Sabah region (JKKN Sabah) auditorium in Jalan Tasik off Old Penampang Road in Luyang, Kota Kinabalu near the Gaya Teachers' Training College in lieu of this venue. It serves as the symbolic centre of the harvest festival celebrations, which take place every 30–31 May. In the past, the rituals of the harvest festival were conducted by the bobohizan, or Kadazan-Dusun priestess, in the paddy fields, but in modern days, it is carried out at the unity hall. In 2018, the Hongkod Koisaan Cultural Unity Centre was officially opened to the public. The hall became the focus of thousands of visitors, including tourists, in conjunction with the culmination of the festival celebration. Further, in 2024, local crafts and food stalls were launched within the hall, where temporary booths are replaced with permanent structures equipped with essential facilities and utilities.

=== Koisaan Cultural Village ===
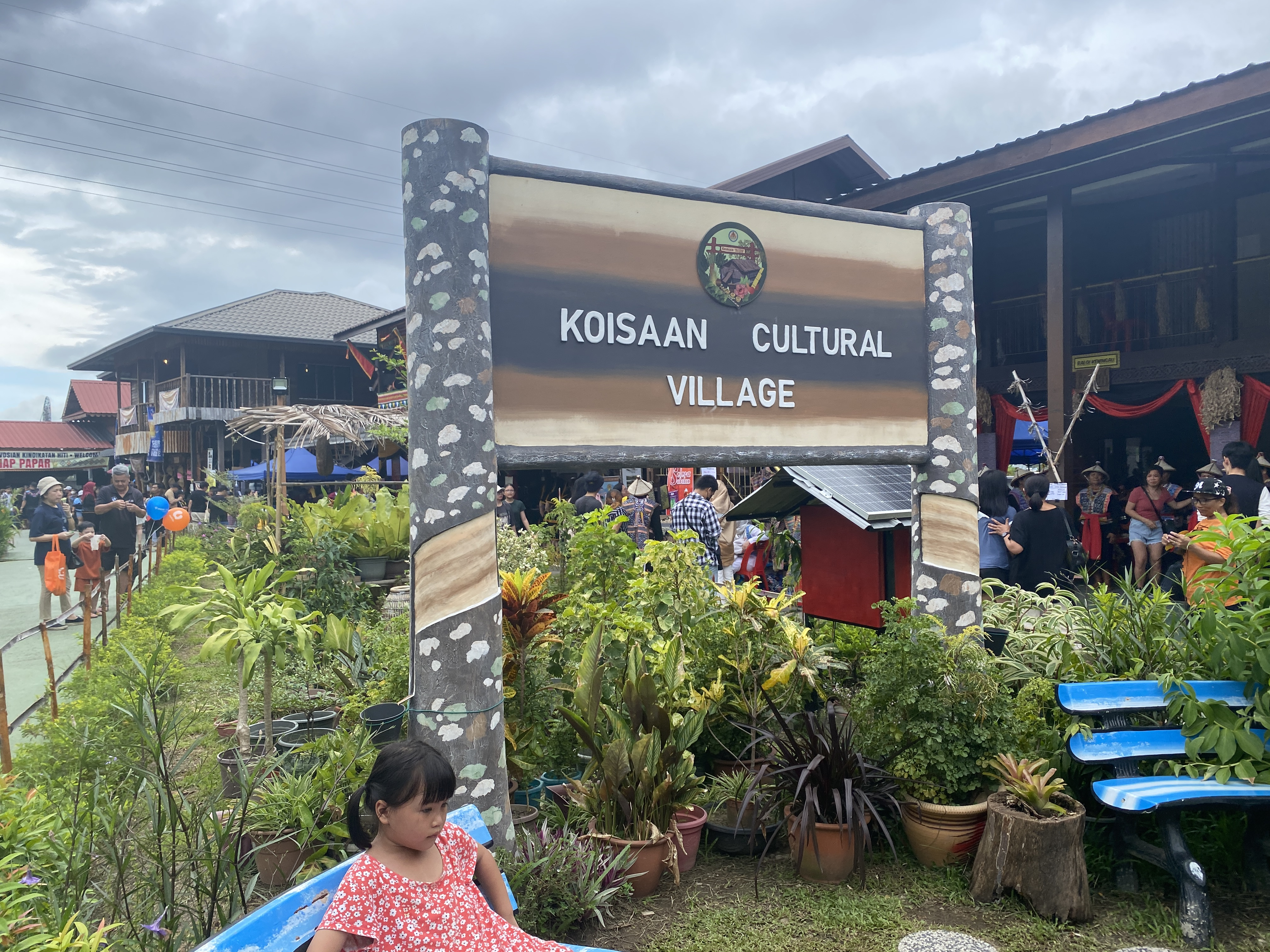
The Koisaan Cultural Village sign

The cultural village features 13 different ethnic groups of Sabah houses in one village comprising the Beaufort, Keningau, Kota Belud, Kuala Penyu, Kudat, Papar, Ranau, Tambunan, Tenom, Labuk-Sugut (Beluran/Telupid), Penampang, Kota Marudu/Pitas and Tuaran traditional houses. Within the village sites, there were a handicraft centre, landscape garden, and a suspension bridge. The village features authentic traditional houses, cultural performances, and various activities such as fire-starting, slingshot, blowpipe shooting, and gong-beating, as well as its gallery and craft shop which showcases authentic Bornean handicrafts and artistry.

== Gallery ==
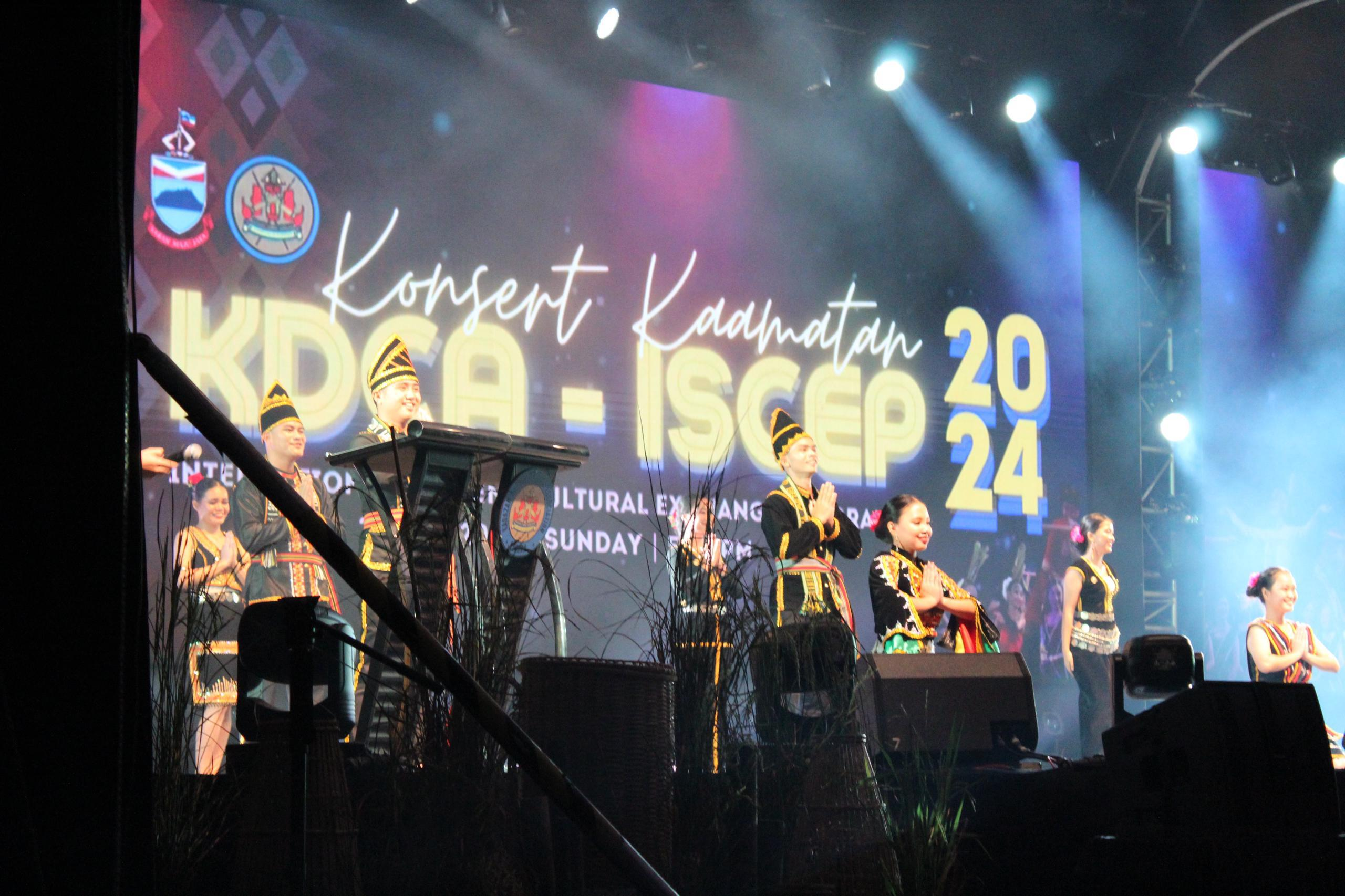
IPG Kent Tuaran Contemporary Dance during the KDCA–ISCEP cultural festival at Hongkod Koisaan

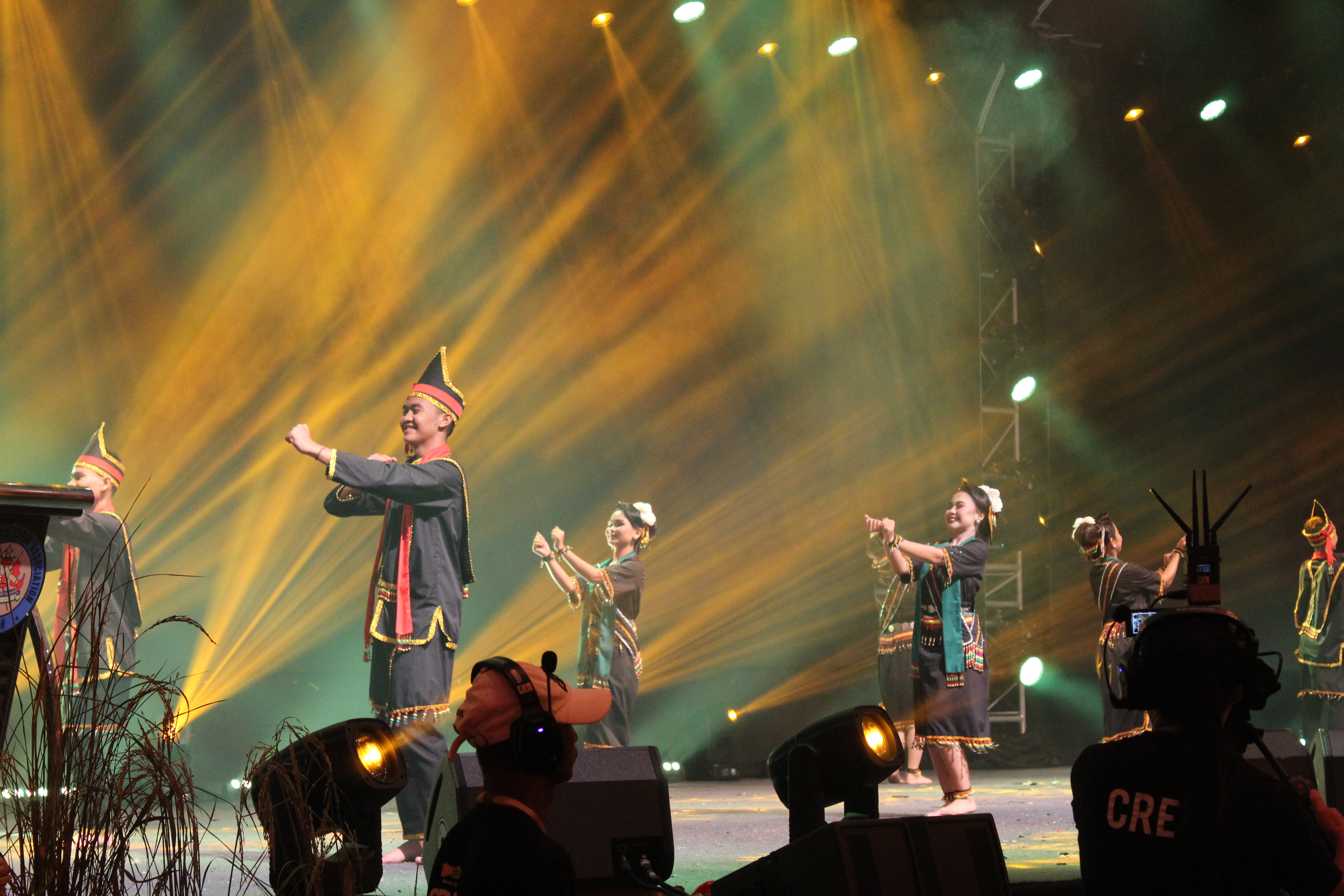
Sayau performances at the Hongkod Koisaan Hall

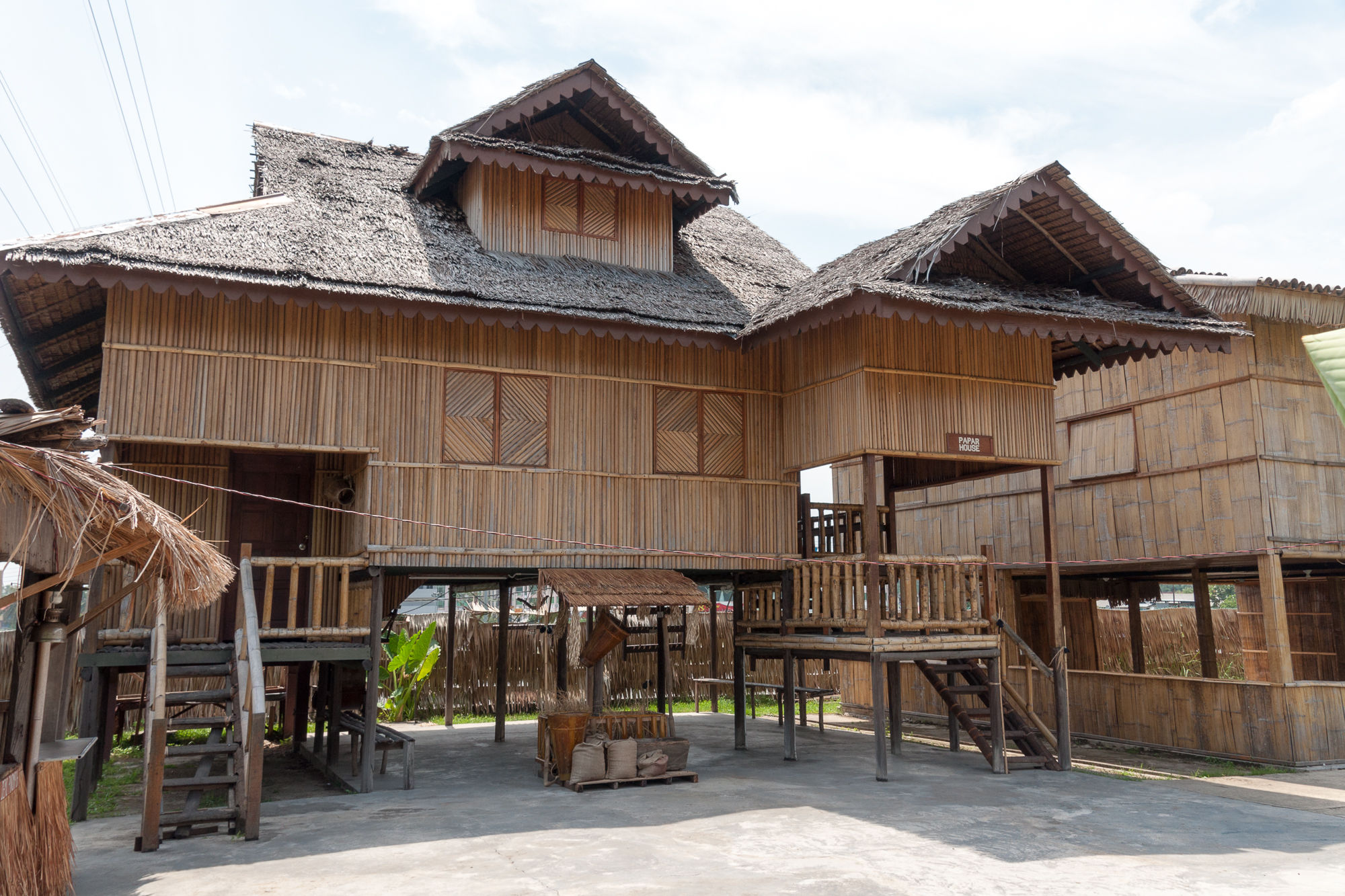
An exhibition of traditional houses within the area of Koisaan Cultural Village featuring Papar House
