= Inanam =

Other transcription(s)
  - Chinese: 下南南
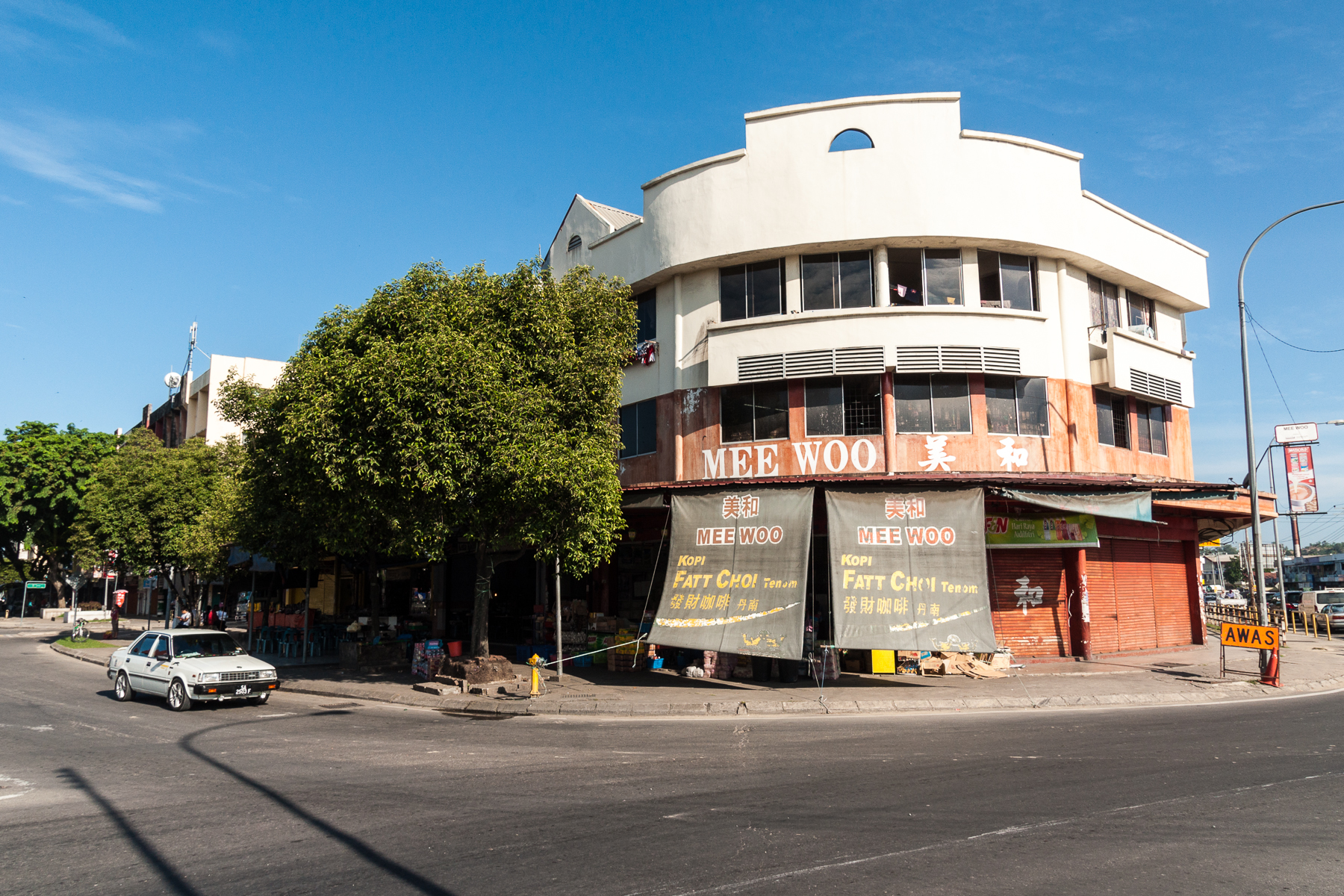
- Inanam town view

- Location within Borneo
- Coordinates: 5°59′N 116°08′E
- Country: Malaysia
- State: Sabah

Inanam is a suburb and sub-district of Kota Kinabalu in Sabah, Malaysia. It is 10 kilometres (6.2 miles) from the city centre.

== History ==
OKK Majimbun Majangkin is considered one of the key player in Inanam development. During World War II, Inanam was the base where the Kinabalu Guerrillas led by Albert Kwok operated to fight the Japanese.

== Demography ==
The town population consists of mainly the native Dusun as well as the Bajau and the dominant minority Chinese who operate the shops. However, there has been a large influx of immigrants both from the southern Philippines and Indonesia. Most of them are undocumented and live as squatters. A considerable number of them however were controversially naturalised and relocated into low-cost housing settlements provided by the Malaysian government.

== Accessibility ==
City Bus Terminal (North), Kota Kinabalu is located in Inanam which become part of the BRT Kota Kinabalu.

== Economy ==
A substantial part of the sub-district near the town centre consists of a light industrial area. Towards the interior, traditional Dusun villages scatter the hill slopes, with fruit orchards and rubber smallholdings.

== Education ==
=== Primary schools ===
- SK Inanam II
- SK Ruminding
- SK St. Catherine
- SK Poring-Poring
- SK Pomotodon
- SK Malawa
- SK Kionsom Inanam
- SK Inanam Laut
- SK Bantayan
- SK Kolombong
- SK Babagon Toki
- SJK (C) Yick Nam

=== Secondary schools ===
- SMK Kolombong
- SMK Inanam
- SMK (A) Tun Ahmadshah Inanam
