= Bus transport in Malaysia =

Overview of bus transportation in Malaysia

Buses play a major role in the public transportation system of Malaysia. Many public and private companies operate various types of buses throughout the various states of Malaysia.

== Regulation ==
Today, bus service provision for public transport in Malaysia is regulated by the Land Public Transport Agency (APAD).

== Types in use ==
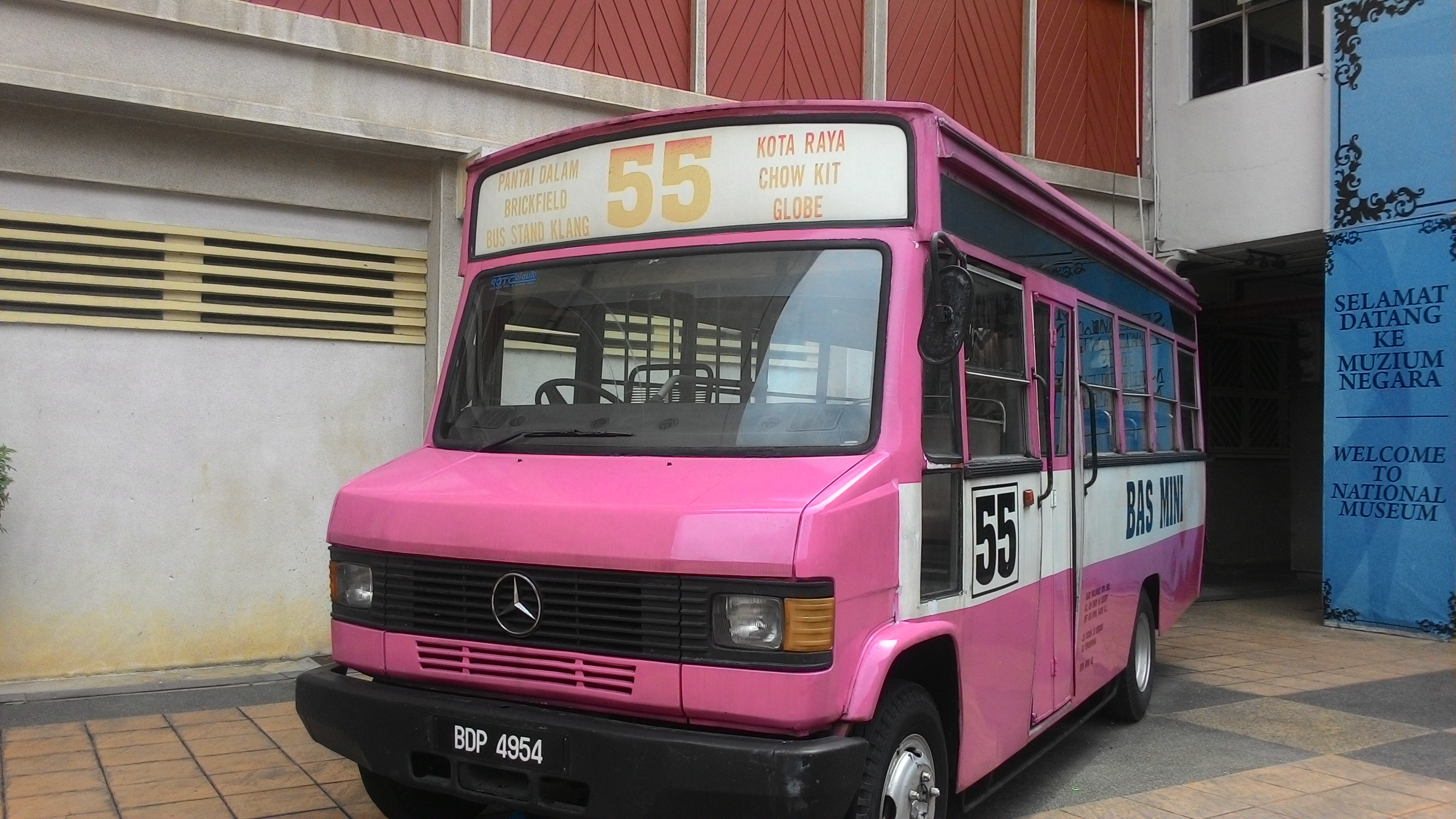
Kuala Lumpur Mini-Bus Service with pink livery used on Hail and ride service, was discontinued from 1 July 1998.

Rapid KL double decker bus and electric buses in Pasar Seni bus hub.

In Malaysia, the most common types of buses used are single-decker buses, double-decker buses, and mini buses. Single-decker buses, also known as city buses, are designed to operate within urban areas and are mostly used for short to medium-length journeys. Double-decker buses, on the other hand, are mainly used for longer journeys, such as intercity travel, and offer greater capacity with their upper decks. Midi buses, which are smaller than full-sized buses but larger than mini buses, are also commonly used in Malaysia. They are ideal for routes with lower passenger demand and narrow roads. In recent years, there has been a growing interest in eco-friendly public transportation, and Malaysia has been introducing electric buses and hybrid buses as well.

As of 2021, the Malaysian government plans to launch a pilot program to introduce hydrogen fuel cell buses in Kuching, Sarawak. These buses produce zero-emission and are expected to improve air quality in urban areas.

== Services ==
Aside from normal urban and inter-urban services, bus transport in Malaysia also has a number of niche uses:

- Express services
- Shuttle bus services, including airport bus (KLIA), university shuttles (UM, UPM and UKM), rail replacement bus service for Kelana Jaya Line and currently Ampang Line
- Employee bus services, which mostly painted in blue colour
- School bus services, which mostly painted in yellow colour
- Hail and Ride services
- Demand responsive transport (DRT) services such as Kumpool, Mobi and TrekRides van pooling service
- Long-distance coach services
- Free public transport such as Go KL City Bus (Malaysian only)

=== Bus rapid transit systems ===
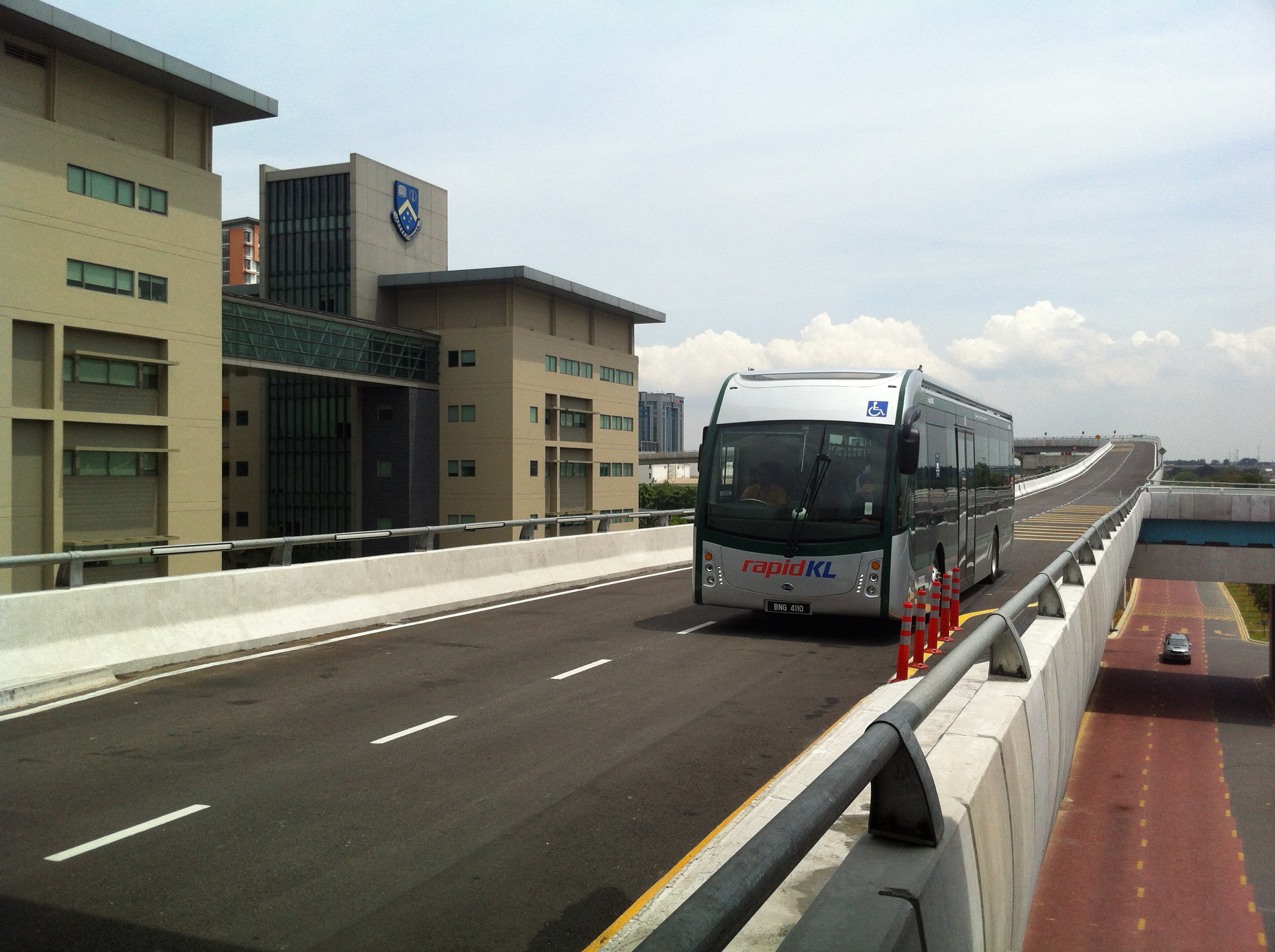
BYD battery-powered electric bus operated in Bandar Sunway, Selangor.

Bus Rapid Transit (BRT) is a high-capacity, high-frequency bus-based public transportation system that has gained popularity in many countries as a cost-effective alternative to traditional light rail systems. BRT systems typically have dedicated lanes, independent stations and high-capacity buses that provide a reliable and efficient service to commuters.

In Malaysia, BRT has become an alternative to light rail proposals due to cost considerations. Currently, only one BRT system in Malaysia, which is the BRT Sunway Line, which serves as a feeder service to the existing rail network in Klang Valley. Sunway BRT services the southeastern suburbs of Petaling Jaya, Selangor and is the world's first all-electric system.

Other cities in Malaysia that have plan to implemented BRT systems include Johor Bahru, Kuching and Kota Kinabalu. The BRT system in Johor Bahru, also known as the Iskandar Malaysia BRT, is part of a larger public transportation network that also includes the RTS Link. It will consist of trunk, direct, and feeder bus rapid transit corridors. The BRT Kota Kinabalu and BRT Kuching were planned to provide a reliable and efficient service to commuters in the city centre in both cities.

=== Autonomous Rapid Transit (ART) ===
The ART, which is a lidar-guided (Note: Light detection and ranging) bi-articulated bus, offers a flexible and cost-effective alternative to traditional rail transit, making it an attractive option for rapidly growing urban areas. On 16 December 2022, the Premier of Sarawak released the Phase 1 integrated transit map of the KUTS project with a 69.9-kilometer route consisting of 3 initial lines and a total of 31 stations (with 5 provisional stations) to be completed in stages, with Phase 1 of the Blue Line scheduled to be completed in 2026 while the remaining lines are to be constructed at a later date.

In Johor's Iskandar Malaysia region, the Autonomous Rapid Transit (ART) system is being proposed. Previous plans to implement this technology in Putrajaya have been dropped due to high costs. In 2026, due to concerns over scalability of the ART system, there are calls to construct an automated people mover instead for Johor Bahru, similar to the LRT in Singapore and the Pujiang Line in Shanghai.

=== Private uses ===
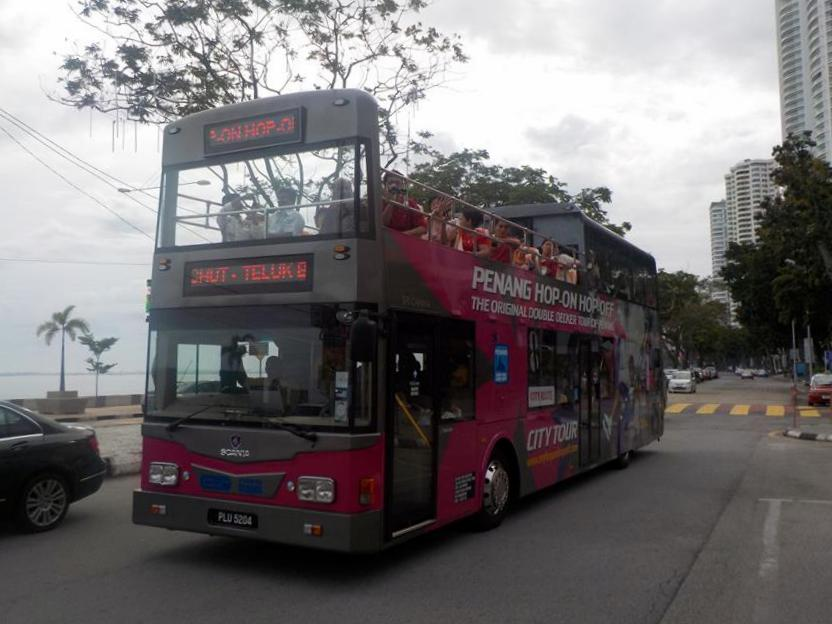
A Hop-On Hop-Off bus at Gurney Drive in George Town, Penang

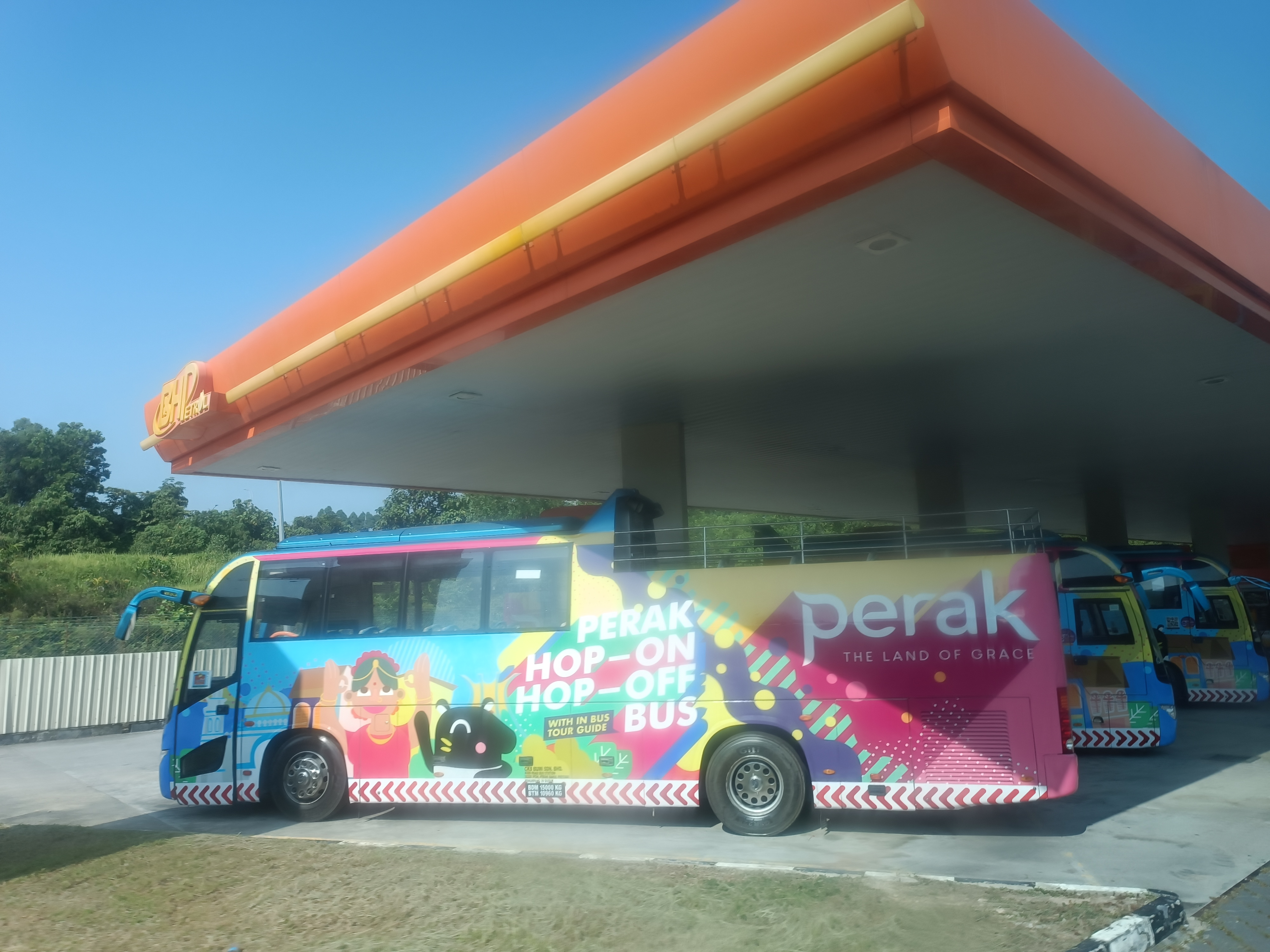
Hop-On Hop-Off bus at Ipoh

Private buses are commonly used in Malaysia for various purposes such as charter services, school transportation and company employee transportation. For example, charter bus Service is offered by Rapid Penang that provides reliable and affordable transportation options for schools, companies or anyone. The service charges are based on the duration of the service or mileage, ranging from RM 600 to RM 1600. Private buses are commonly used for holiday travel as well, with many companies offering tour packages that include transportation by private bus.

Private buses used for holiday travel in Malaysia are typically equipped with air conditioning, comfortable seating, and often have on-board entertainment systems. They are used for a variety of tours, including city tours, nature tours, and cultural tours. For example, Hop-On Hop-Off concept open top bus is available in Kuala Lumpur and Penang. Private buses can be rented for exclusive use by tour groups, providing flexibility and convenience to the group.

== Operating companies ==
Bus services in Malaysia are primarily operated by private companies, with a few community-based or not-for-profit entities and local authority-affiliated companies also in operation.

=== Stage bus ===
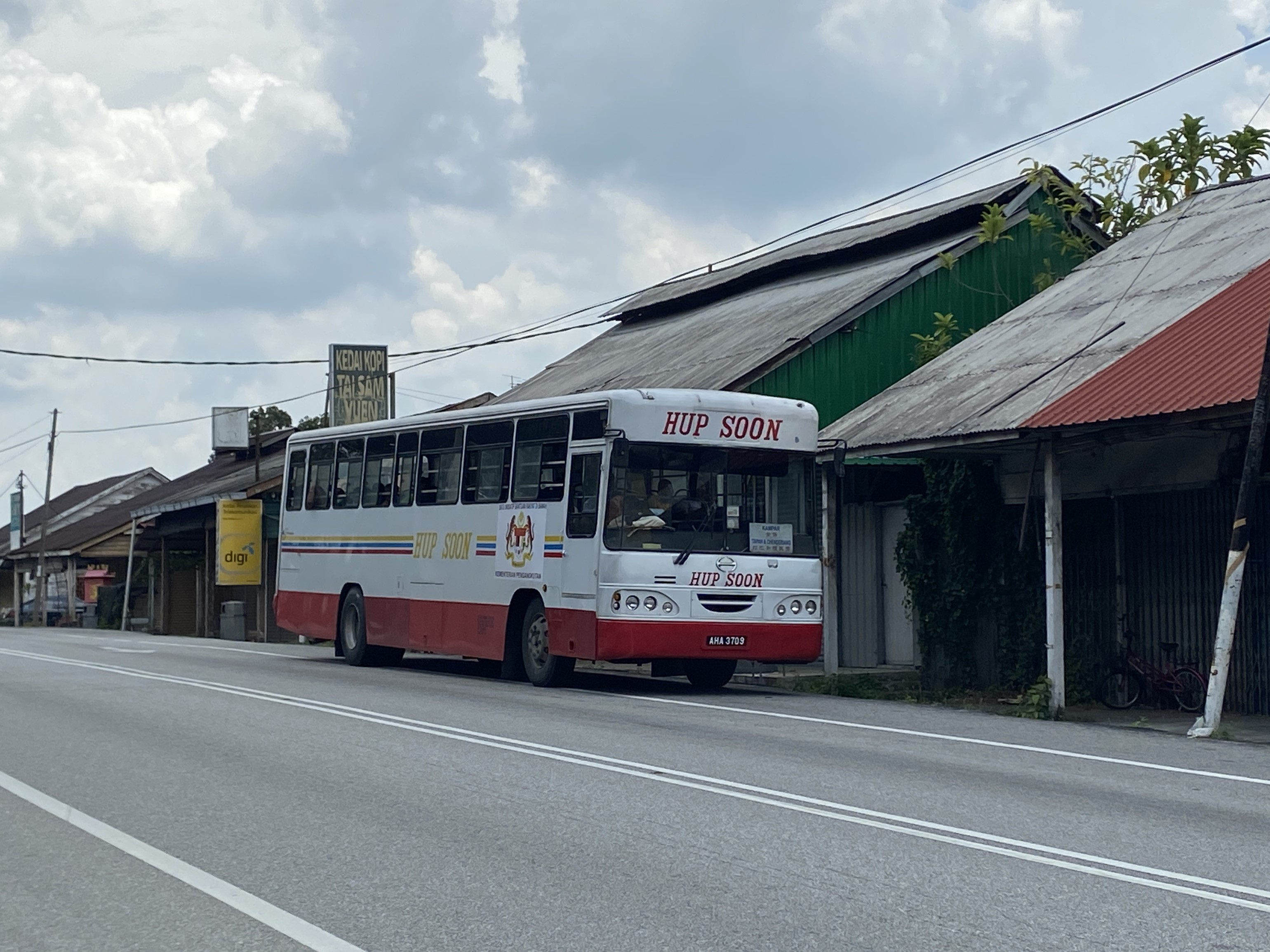
Hup Soon bus in Perak, funded under ISBSF.

UM Shuttle Bus once operated by the university management, currently operated by Kiffah

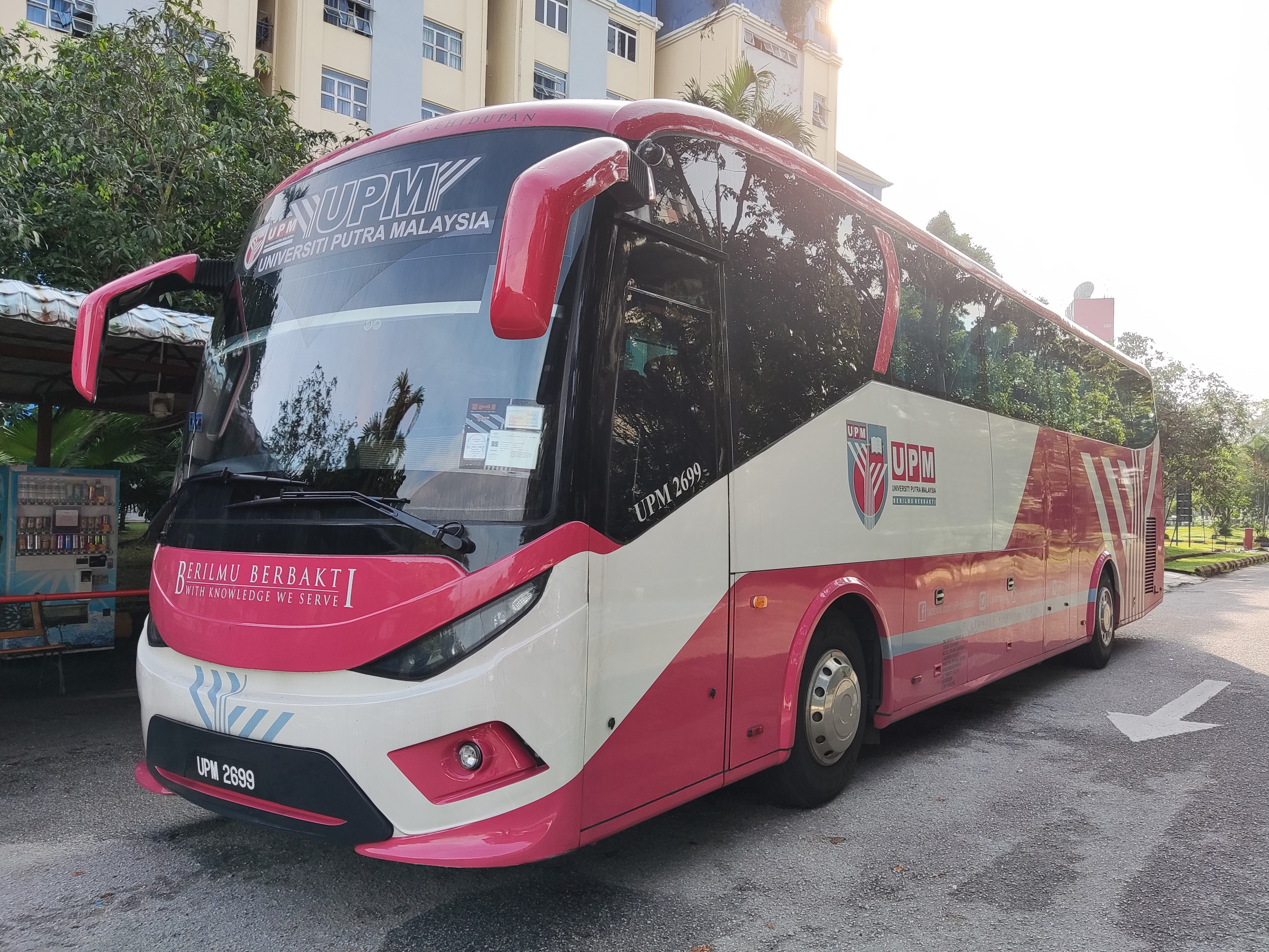
The campus bus in UPM is managed by its Student Affairs Division

The largest stage bus operator in Malaysia is the government-owned company Prasarana Malaysia Berhad, which operates a number of stage bus services under the subsidiary of Rapid Bus in several regions such as the Klang Valley and Greater Penang. Other major stage bus operators in Malaysia include Causeway Link (mainly in Johor Bahru, Melaka and Klang Valley) and PerakTransit. The federal government also has established the Interim Stage Bus Support Fund (ISBSF) to help cover the daily operating costs of other stage bus operators, especially in rural areas, who have incurred losses due to unprofitable routes. This initiative was created to ensure that small bus companies do not terminate their services and continue to operate in rural areas.

States	Service areas	Stage bus operators	Bus terminal
Perlis	Perlis	BAS.MY Kangar (MARA Liner)	
Kedah	Universiti Utara Malaysia (UUM)	BAS.MY Kangar (MARA Liner), UUM	university shuttle bus
Kedah	Alor Setar, Padang Terap	Jalan Langgar, HBR, MARA Liner	Shahab Perdana
Kedah	Sungai Petani	Tanjung Mewah, MARA Liner	
Kedah	Intercity routes	MARA Liner	
Kedah	Intercity routes	Rapid Penang	
Penang	Penang	Rapid Penang	Weld Quay, KOMTAR, Bukit Jambul, Sungai Nibong, Penang Sentral, The Summit, Dato Kailan
Penang	Universiti Sains Malaysia (USM)	USM (Unic Leisure)	university shuttle bus
Penang	Bukit Mertajam	Lean Hock	The Summit
Perak	Ipoh, Kampar, Batu Gajah, Seri Iskandar	BAS.MY Ipoh (PerakTransit)	Medan Kidd
Perak	Kuala Kangsar	PerakTransit, Wai Thong, Red Omnibus	Kuala Kangsar
Perak	Lenggong, Gerik	PerakTransit	
Perak	Manjung, Beruas	PerakTransit	
Perak	Batu Gajah	PerakTransit	
Perak	Teluk Intan, Kampung Gajah	PerakTransit	Teluk Intan
Perak	Kampar, Tapah	Bas Perak Sejahtera (PerakTransit)	Kampar
Perak	Sungai Siput	Bas Perak Sejahtera (PerakTransit)	Sungai Siput
Perak	Taiping	Red Omnibus, Bas Perak Sejahtera (PerakTransit)	Taiping, Kamunting
Perak	Taiping	Blue Omnibus	Terminal Taiping
Perak	Pantai Remis, Manjung, Sitiawan, Lumut, Simpang, Terong, Changkat Jering, Kuala Sepetang, Matang	Blue Omnibus	Terminal Taiping, Seri Manjung Bus Station, Lumut Bus Station
Perak	Parit Buntar	Rapid Penang, Red Omnibus	
Perak	Sungkai, Bidor	Bas Perak Sejahtera (PerakTransit)	
Perak	Bagan Datuk	MARA Liner	
Perak	Kamunting, Bagan Serai, Selama, Sungai Siputeh, Batu Kurau, Padang Rengas, Simpang Ampat Semanggol	Red Omnibus	
Kelantan	Kota Bharu, Tumat, Pasir Mas, Bachok, Machang, Kuala Krai, Gua Musang	BAS.MY Kota Bharu (Mutiara Rentas Desa)	Kota Bahru (Stage Bus Terminal)
Terengganu	Kuala Terengganu, Marang, Hulu Terengganu	BAS.MY Kuala Terengganu (MARA Liner)	
Pahang	Kuantan, Pekan	BAS.MY Kuantan (Sanwa Tours)	Kuantan Sentral
Pahang	Pekan	Sanwa Tours	
Pahang	Raub	Central Pahang, Pahang Lin Siong, Sanwa Tours	
Pahang	Lipis, Jerantut	Pahang Lin Siong	
Pahang	Bentong	Sanwa, Sri Marong	
Pahang	Temerloh, Maran	Green Transit Liner	
Selangor	12 cities and municipalities	Smart Selangor Bus (Rapid KL, MARA Liner, Wawasan Sutera or Causeway Link)	Klang Sentral, Banting, Rawang
Selangor	Klang Valley	Rapid KL (including MRT and LRT Feeder bus)	Bandar Utama, Wira Damai, Sri Nilam (Bandar Baru Ampang), Terminal Kajang
Selangor	Rawang, Hulu Selangor	MARA Liner	Rawang, Bukit Sentosa, Kuala Kubu Bharu
Selangor	Kuala Selangor, Bestari Jaya	Selangor Bus / Causeway Link (Handal Indah)	Kuala Selangor
Selangor	Puchong, Port Klang	Handal Ceria / Causeway Link (Handal Indah)	Port Klang
Selangor	Klang, Banting, Kuala Selangor, Sabak Bernam	Wawasan Sutera	Klang, Banting
Selangor	Universiti Putra Malaysia (UPM)	UPM	university shuttle bus
Selangor	Universiti Kebangsaan Malaysia (UKM)	UKM (Kiffah)	university shuttle bus
Selangor	Sungai Besar	PerakTransit	
Federal Territories	Kuala Lumpur (Transport in Greater Kuala Lumpur)	Rapid KL	Pasar Seni, Titiwangsa, Maluri, Terminal Bersepadu Selatan
Federal Territories	Kuala Lumpur (Transport in Greater Kuala Lumpur)	DBKL (Go KL City Bus)	Pasar Seni, Titiwangsa, Maluri, Terminal Bersepadu Selatan
Federal Territories	Universiti Malaya (UM)	UM (Kiffah)	university shuttle bus
Federal Territories	Putrajaya	Nadi Putra (Rapid KL)	Putrajaya Sentral, Kompleks E
Federal Territories	Putrajaya	KR Travel and Tours	Putrajaya Sentral
Negeri Sembilan	Seremban, Port Dickson, Bahau, Tampin, Nilai, KLIA, Kuala Klawang	BAS.MY Seremban (Gopi Travel Tours, KR Travel and Tours, Southern Omnibus, United)	Terminal 1, Port Dickson, Kuala Pilah, Bahau, Tampin, Nilai, KLIA, Kuala Klawang
Negeri Sembilan	Rembau, Lubok China, Tampin, Gemas	Rentas Negeri Sembilan (MARA Liner)	Rembau, Tampin, Gemencheh, Gemas
Negeri Sembilan	Seremban, Nilai, Jempol	Bas Percuma Negeri Sembilan (MARA Liner)	Terminal 1, Nilai, Jempol
Negeri Sembilan	Tampin, Gemas	Southern Omnibus	Tampin, Gemencheh, Gemas
Negeri Sembilan	Tampin, Bahau	SG Liner Holidays (Batang Bus)	Tampin, Gemencheh, Bahau, Kuala Pilah, Bahau
Melaka	Bandaraya Melaka, Alor Gajah, Masjid Tanah, Batang Melaka, Tanjung Kling, Pulau Sebang (Tampin), Jasin	BAS.MY Melaka (Handal Indah, MARA Liner)	Melaka Sentral, Alor Gajah, Masjid Tanah, Tampin
Melaka	Alor Gajah, Masjid Tanah, Lubok China, Jasin, Tangkak	MARA Liner	Alor Gajah, Masjid Tanah, Jasin, Tangkak
Melaka	Bandaraya Melaka, Jasin, Tangkak	Mayangsari Express	Melaka Sentral, Jasin, Tangkak, Muar (Maharani)
Johor	16 cities and municipalities (Johor Bahru, Kulai, Pasir Gudang, Iskandar Puteri, Batu Pahat, Kluang, Kota Tinggi, Mersing, Muar, Pontian, Segamat, Simpang Renggam, Tangkak, Yong Peng, Pengerang and Labis)	Bas Muafakat Johor	
Johor	Gemas, Segamat, Ayer Hitam	Yow Hoe	Gemas, Segamat, Labis, Chaah, Yong Peng, Ayer Hitam
Johor	Muar, Tangkak, Segamat	North West Johore	Maharani, Bentayan, Tangkak, Segamat
Johor	Muar, Batu Pahat, Yong Peng, Labis	Mayangsari Express	Maharani, Bentayan, Batu Pahat, Yong Peng, Labis
Johor	Batu Pahat, Benut	Coastal Omnibus	Batu Pahat, Benut
Johor	Benut, Pontian, Kukup	Kembara City	Benut, Pontian, Kukup
Johor	Batu Pahat, Ayer Hitam, Kluang	Johore Motor Bus	Batu Pahat, Ayer Hitam, Kluang
Johor	Batu Pahat, Ayer Hitam	Causeway Link (Handal Indah)	Batu Pahat, Ayer Hitam
Johor	Kulai, Ayer Hitam, Batu Pahat, Yong Peng	Green Transit Liner	Kulai, Ayer Hitam, Batu Pahat, Yong Peng
Johor	Iskandar Malaysia (Johor Bahru, Kota Tinggi, Pasir Gudang, Kulai, Iskandar Puteri and Pontian)	BAS.MY Johor Bahru (Handal Indah, Transit Link (Johor Bahru), Maju, S&S International)	JB Sentral, Larkin Sentral, Gelang Patah, Taman Universiti, Kulai, Ulu Tiram, Kota Tinggi, Pontian, Pasir Gudang, Masai
Johor	Iskandar Malaysia (Johor Bahru, Kota Tinggi, Pasir Gudang, Kulai, Iskandar Puteri and Pontian)	Causeway Link (Handal Indah)	JB Sentral, Larkin Sentral, Perling Mall, Taman Ungku Tun Aminah (TUTA), Johor Premium Outlets, Senai Airport, Gelang Patah, Pontian, Johor Bahru CIQ (Sultan Iskandar Building), Sultan Abu Bakar Complex
Johor	Iskandar Malaysia (Johor Bahru, Kota Tinggi, Pasir Gudang, Kulai, Iskandar Puteri and Pontian)	City Bus (Transit Link (Johor Bahru))	Kulai, Ayer Hitam
Johor	Universiti Teknologi Malaysia (UTM)	UTM Fleet	university shuttle bus
Johor	Desaru, Kota Tinggi, Pasir Gudang, Pengerang	MARA Liner	Bandar Penawar, Kota Tinggi, Pasir Gudang, Sungai Rengit
Sabah	Kota Kinabalu city area	BAS.MY Kota Kinabalu (Handal Indah)	KK Sentral
Sabah	Kota Kinabalu and surrounding area	individual private owners	
Sabah	Sandakan	individual private owners	
Sabah	Tawau	individual private owners	
Sarawak	Kuching, Serian	BAS.MY Kuching (Biaramas) , CPL	Open Air Market and Saujana (Kuching), Serian bus terminal (Serian)
Sarawak	Miri City	Miri City Smart Bus	Pelita Tunku
Sarawak	Miri City-Long Lama	MTC	Pelita Tunku
Sarawak	Sibu	Lanang Bus, Sungei Merah Bus, Teku Bus	Sibu Wharf
Sarawak	Sarikei, Sarikei-Sibu, Bintangor-Sibu	Borneo Bus	Sarikei Wharf (Sarikei), Sibu Wharf (Sibu), Bintangor Wharf (Bintangor)
Sarawak	Bintulu	CPL	Terminal Parkcity
Sarawak	Mukah-Dalat	Rejang Bus	Mukah Bus Terminal

=== Express bus ===
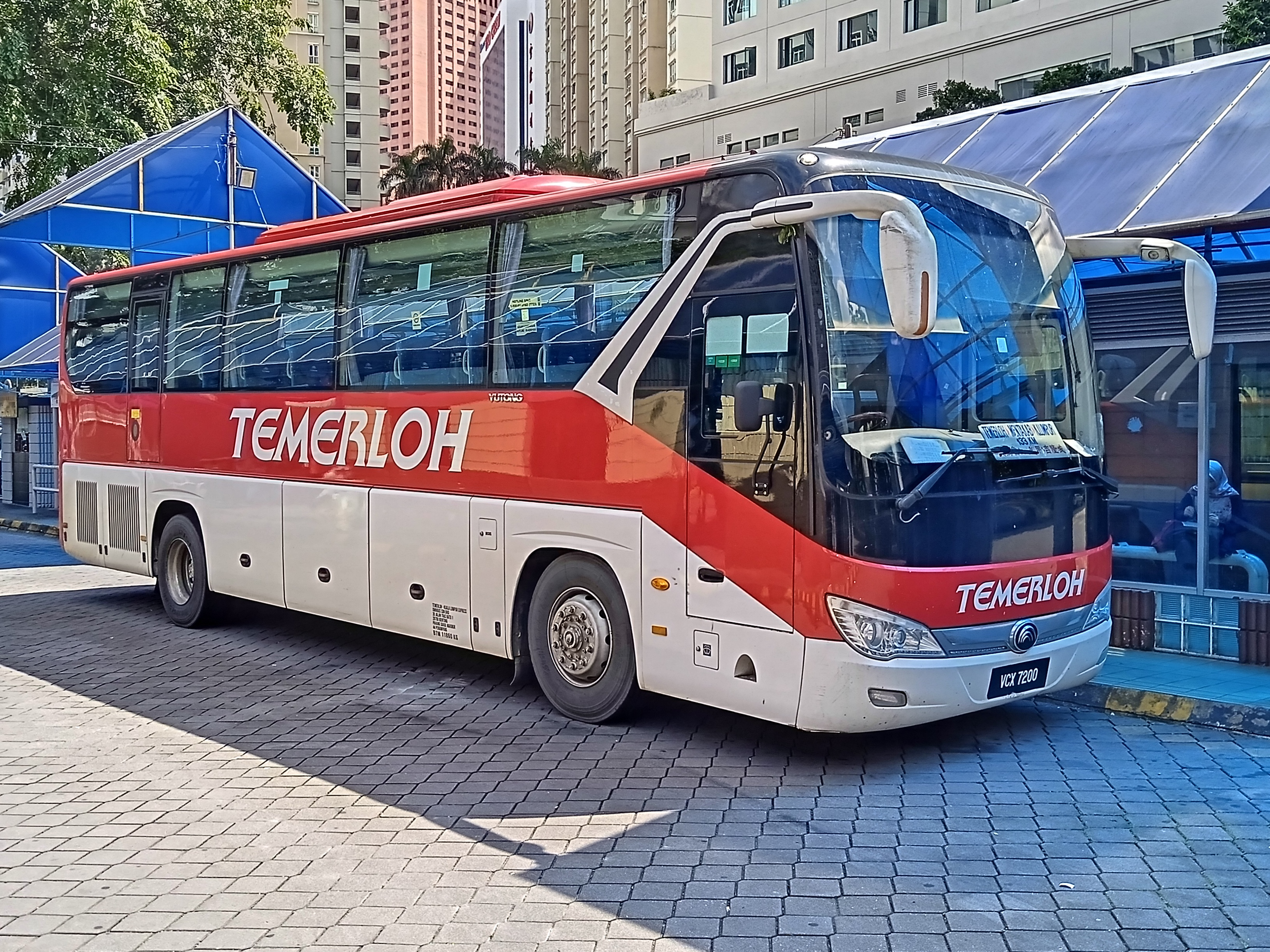
Express bus

Express bus services are one of the most convenient ways to travel across Malaysia, where there are over a hundred bus companies. These bus companies offer different routes, schedules, fares and booking procedures. Among these bus companies, several popular bus operators are preferred by both locals and tourists alike.

Transnasional, established in 2007, offers several routes throughout Malaysia, with a fleet of nearly 1,500 buses. The company offers coaches ranging from standard to business and executive class. Mayang Sari Express was founded in 1993 and now has a fleet of over a hundred buses. They offer trips from Johor to Alor Setar and Johor to Pulau Pinang, among other routes. The company provides luxury coaches at competitive prices. KKKL Express began services in 1983.

These popular bus companies in Malaysia offer a range of services that cater to the needs of different passengers, with several online booking options available. The coaches in their fleet are equipped with modern amenities.

=== Automated Rapid Transit (ART) ===
Sarawak Metro was set up by the Sarawak Economic Development Corporation (SEDC) as a way to operate and develop the state's public transportation assets. It is currently in charge of leading the Kuching Urban Transportation System (KUTS) ART project that is undergoing construction as well as maintaining its fleet of hydrogen fuel cell buses.

== Manufacturers ==
Bus manufacturing in Malaysia is dominated by foreign companies with few domestic manufacturers. However, there have been some local players in the market, including DRB-HICOM Bhd, which manufactures buses through its subsidiary, HICOM Automotive Manufacturers (Malaysia) Sdn Bhd.

Foreign manufacturers such as Scania, Volvo and Mercedes-Benz are among the major players in Malaysia's bus manufacturing industry. Scania has been manufacturing buses in Malaysia since the 1970s and has a significant market share in the country. Volvo, through its Malaysian subsidiary, Volvo Malaysia Sdn Bhd, also manufactures buses locally.

There has been a push towards electric buses in Malaysia, with several companies, including Scania and Volvo, introducing electric bus models in the country.

== Subsidies ==
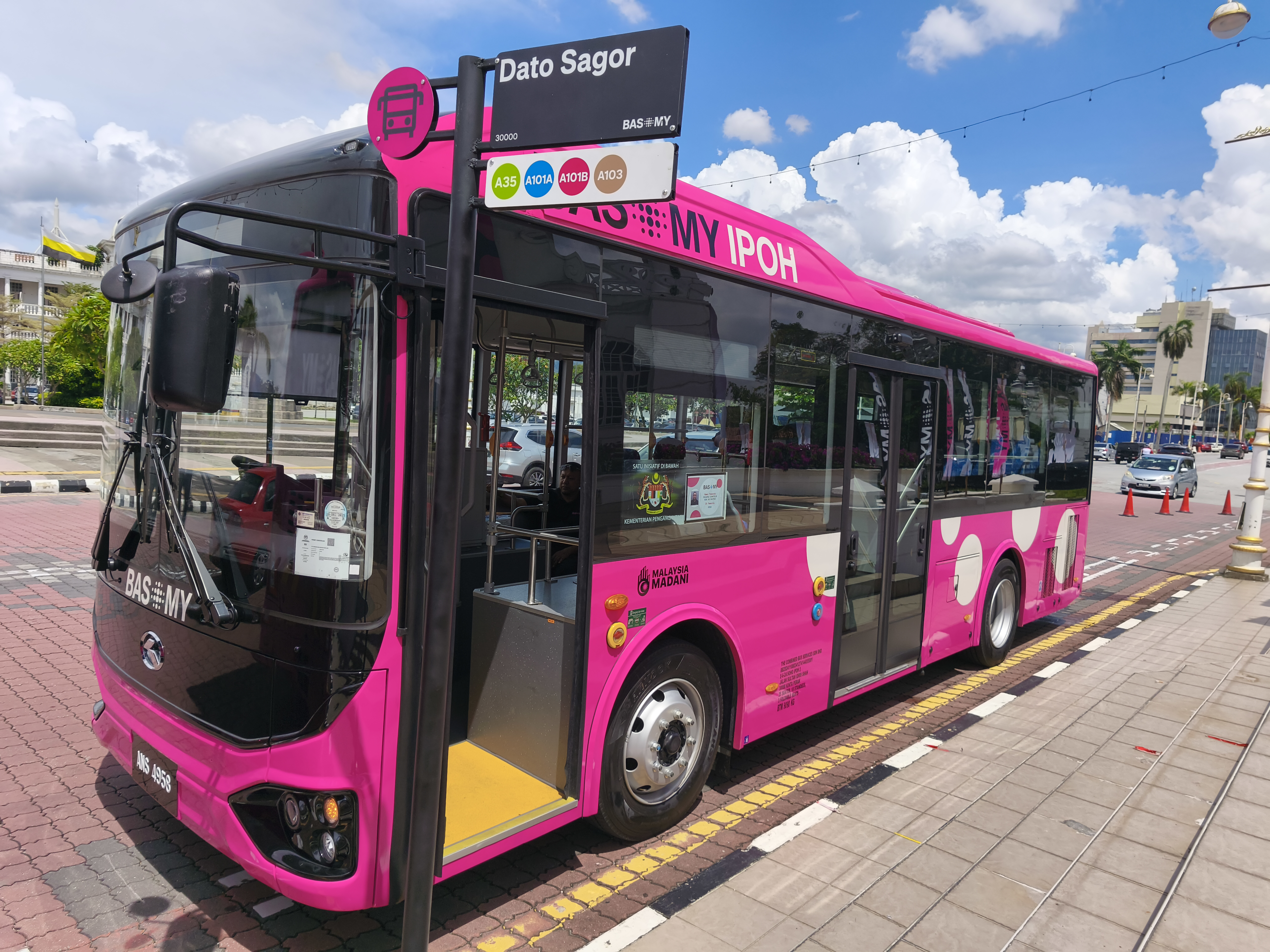
BAS.MY in Ipoh, Perak

In Malaysia, bus subsidies are an important part of the government's efforts to promote public transportation and reduce traffic congestion. One notable initiative is the My50 monthly bus pass, which allows unlimited travel on Rapid KL, MRT and BRT services for only RM50 per month. It was introduced by the Federal Government under the Penjana Economic Recovery Plan in June 2020 as the My30 unlimited travel pass until December 31, 2021. This has been a popular program in the Klang Valley and similar initiatives have been implemented in other states, such as Penang with the Mutiara Pass. Cross-strait bus service (which is known as CAT Bridge) also available to provide bus services between Penang Island and Seberang Perai, and operated at free during working days.

In addition to the unlimited pass program, there have been other subsidies and incentives aimed at encouraging the use of buses. Stage Bus Service Transformation (SBST) was established by the government in 2015. In these states, SBST aims to improve existing bus services by providing better routes, schedules and vehicles. The initiative also includes the introduction of cashless payment systems and the integration of bus services with other modes of public transportation. This program is active in state capitals of Malaysia except Selangor and Penang.

Smart Selangor Bus service, which is a state-funded bus service funded by the Selangor state government. The service was launched in 2018 as part of the state government's efforts to improve public transportation and reduce traffic congestion in the region. The service is operated by private bus operators under contract with the state government and covers 12 cities and municipalities in Selangor, including Petaling Jaya, Shah Alam, Klang and Subang Jaya. The Smart Selangor bus service features a number of modern amenities and technologies aimed at improving the comfort and convenience of passengers. All buses are equipped with air-conditioning, free Wi-Fi, and GPS tracking systems, which allow passengers to track the location of their bus in real-time through a mobile app. In addition, the buses are wheelchair-accessible and equipped with CCTV cameras for enhanced security.

To encourage the use of public transportation, the Smart Selangor bus service offers affordable fares and various ticketing options, including cashless payment methods using CePAT apps for non-Malaysians, while Malaysians are excluded from paying the fares. The service also offers a variety of route options that connect to other modes of public transportation, such as rail and bus interchanges and also public amenities including government hospitals, schools and commercial area.

== See also ==
- List of BAS.MY bus routes
- Transport in Malaysia
