= List of roads in Ipoh =

Street map of Ipoh in 1921. The Kinta River and FMS railway run from the north to the SW corner. The heart of the town lies between them. Hugh Low Street is the main road running east–west, crossing the river, passing through the centre of town and leading to the railway station. As it leaves the town, it forks to the South East becoming Gopeng Road - the main road to Gopeng which was one of the first roads in the region.

This is a list of main roads and streets in Ipoh — the capital of the Perak state of Malaysia. Like many city streets in Malaysia and Singapore, these were named after British colonial officers or adjacent landmarks in English. Following the independence of Malaya in 1957 and the prescription of Malay as the country's national language, the city's streets were renamed after local politicians and royalty, with the Malay word jalan being used to indicate a main road.

The town is located on the Kinta River which was the main means of communication to the area until 1895 when the Kinta Valley Railway opened. It grew up at the point on the river at which it ceased to be navigable and the landing stage was by an old upas tree from which the town took its name. During the 1890s the town expanded rapidly from a market village to a booming mining town as large number of Chinese coolies came to the area to work the tin mines of the Kinta valley. The only two roads initially in the area were the cart tracks linking the mines to the landing stages. A wooden bridge was built across the Kinta river on the road to Gopeng which became Hugh Low Street.

Plots of land had been sold to the Chinese by the local land-owning aristocrat, the Dato Panglima Kinta, Mohamed Jusuf, who had laid them out with broad, straight streets but the rapid development had been disorderly so that the main road to Gopeng varied in width from 20 to 70 feet. There was then a great fire on 1 June 1892, which destroyed much of the town's wooden buildings which had attap palm thatch roofs. The reconstruction of the town was organised by the British Collector of Land Revenue, W.J.P. Hume, who straightened the road network, redrew the land boundaries and issued new title deeds. He had no formal authority to do so but his influence and good sense made a success of the scheme. The streets were now 50–60 feet wide, brick drains were laid and shade trees planted.

Hugh Low Street around 1910. This was named after Hugh Low — the influential fourth Resident of Perak.

Reminiscences of R. Ayaru writing in 1950 about the Ipoh of 1895

In the early part of 1895, I came to Malaya. I embarked at Penang, sailed in a coastal steamship for Teluk Anson—and entrained for Ipoh. I was taken to my uncle's house in Hale Street. A few weeks after I was admitted into the Anglo-Chinese school, which was then behind the present site of the Labour and Land Office (1950). The undermentioned roads and streets were in existence when I first came to Ipoh:-

Station Road: It turned off to the road in front of the Kinta Town Board and joined Hale Street. The table-land, on which the Clock Tower now stands, sloped down to Hale Street. Consequently Station Road did not continue as far as Belfield Street, as you see now.

The road in front of the Kinta Town Board continued its course straight across the Ipoh Padang and Clayton Road to the sloping road on the west side of the St. Michael's Institution (which did not exist then), and continued to Kuala Kangsar Road. There were a few attap-roofed plank houses along the sides of the road across the padang (which was not a padang then). The Ipoh Club was in a plank building at the corner of Club Road and Hugh Low Street.

Belfield Street: This street terminated at Hale Street in the North and at Patrick Street in the South. From here it turned off to Lahat Road.

Leech Street: This ended at Hale Street and Hill Street.

Treacher Street: Terminated at Panglima Street in the north. On the south it stretched as far as the Kinta River. Across the river there was a narrow wooden bridge to enable the kampong people to pass by.

Hale Street extended as far as the river bank. There was no bund, but a platform was constructed for people to bathe — chiefly the Chinese.

Panglima Street ended at Treacher Street because the bend in the river was there.

Market Street had its end at Belfield Street in the west and at the Market on the river bank on the east. This was the only market for Ipoh at the time.

Hugh Low Street extended as far as the Ipoh Hospital in front of the railway station in the west and Tambun and Gopeng Roads in the east. There was a wooden bridge across the river. This street did not go as it does today, but turned onto the road by the side of the Malay mosque and joined Gopeng Road at the spot where Universal Motors now stands. Opposite to this was the iron foundry, known as Riley Hargreaves. On this road, by the side of Anderson Road, was the old Mariammem temple. There was no New Town then. There were kampongs and jungle in that area. Dato Laxamana's house with fort was in the centre of the present Ipoh Market Square adjoining Laxamana Road, which was a bridle path.

Club Road terminated in the north at Station Road and in the south at Lahat Road. By the side of Club Road, where the bus station now lies, was the railway goods shed.

Lahat Road was as it is today. On Lahat Road between Patrick Street and the old Cold Storage Road was the Ipoh Foundry. The Majestic Hotel — some years ago known as the Grand Hotel — was the residence of Dato Wahab (the Dato Muda) and later of Orang Kaya Sri Adika Raja, Mohamed Salleh Isa. The high ground where the Anglo-Chinese School main building stands was a Malay kampong. The other buildings you see on Lahat Road were not in existence then. Falim was a vegetable garden and later a rubber estate.

Connolly Road: There was no such road then, but Hill Street extended as far as Connolly Road behind the houses on Jelf Road. A bridle path stretched up to the Biroh School, at which place was the incinerator (built 1897). The playground by the side was the old hospital burial ground.

In general, Brewster Road, Jalan Datoh, Clayton Road, Silibin Road and Maxwell Road were not in existence. Labrooy Town was a swampy place. The Istana and Residency was at Istana Road. The eastern side of the Ipoh padang was a swamp where buffaloes wallowed. Kenion Street was the bed of the Kinta River, which flowed close to Treacher Street and in front of the Chinese Temple in the People's Park. In the space between Kenion Street and the houses on the right of Market Street stood the Malay mosque. The present transport office was the former Post and Telegraph Office. The present Detective Office was the former police station. The gambling houses were at the corners of Market and Leech Streets. Panglima and Hill Streets were famous for the Chinese and Indian beauties respectively.

— R. Ayaru, Ipoh: The Town That Tin Built

== Roads ==
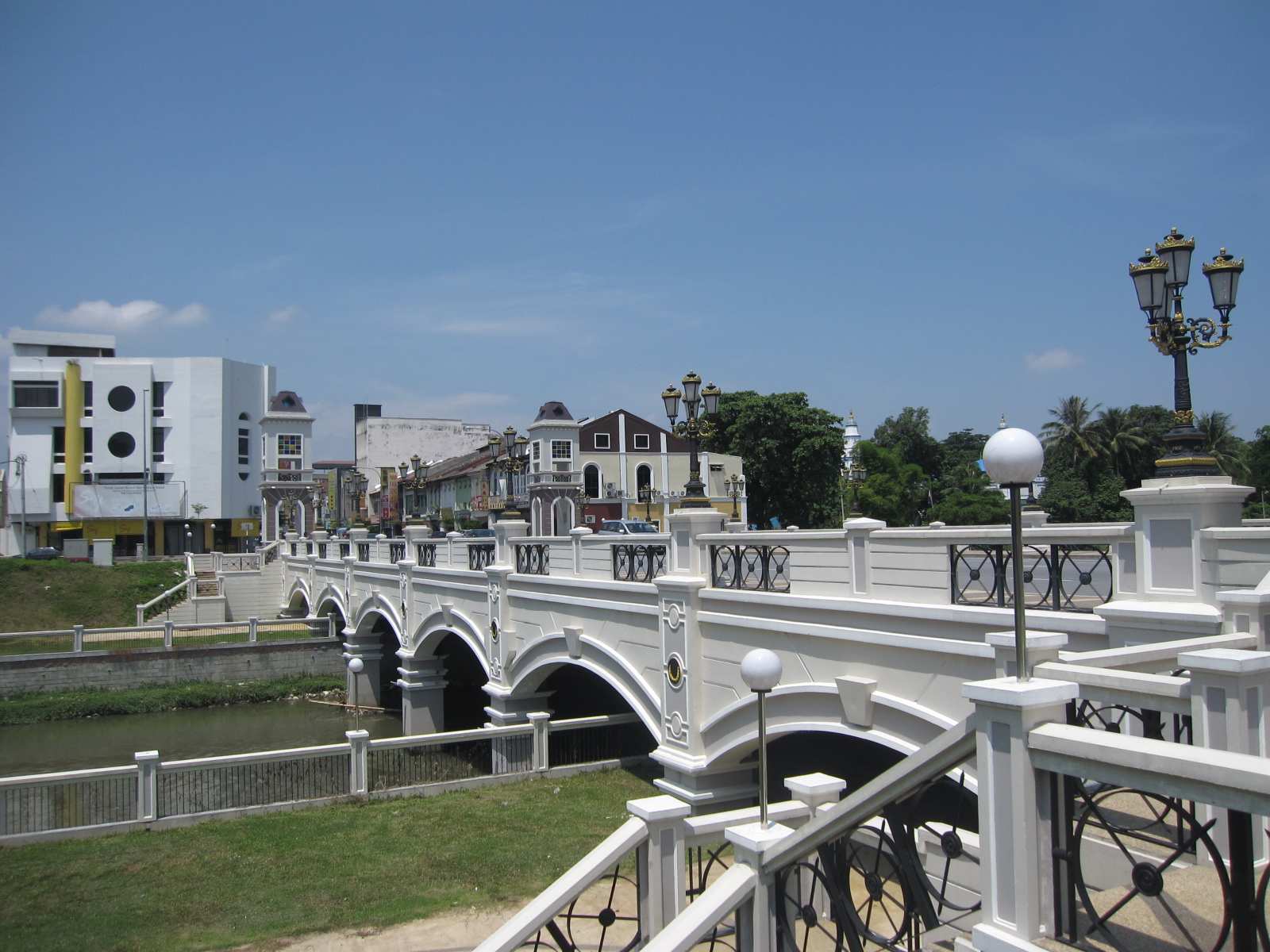
The bridge carrying Jalan Sultan Iskandar over the Kinta River. The street was formerly named Hugh Low Street after the fourth Resident of Perak. It is still known to locals by this name or the abbreviation HLS.

Panglima Lane where concubines were kept

British name	Chinese name	Malay name	Notes
Anderson Road	安德申路 On Dak San Lou	Jalan Raja Musa Aziz	Formerly named after Sir John Anderson, Governor of the Straits Settlements and High Commissioner for the Federated Malay States. Now named after Raja Musa Aziz, Raja Muda of Perak.
Ashby Road	阿士比路 Ah Si Bei Lou	Jalan Raja Ashman Shah	The main road fronting the Raja Permaisuri Bainun Hospital. Formerly named after William John Bernard Ashby, the first Secretary of the Kinta Sanitary Board, it was renamed to Jalan Hospital before it was renamed again after Raja Ashman Shah, the former Raja Kechil Sulong of Perak in 2012.
Belfield Street	微路菲街 Wai Lou Fei Gaai / 墨露菲街 Mak Lou Fei Gaai / 錫米街 Sek Mai Gaai	Jalan Sultan Yusuf	Formerly named after Sir H C Belfield, the 9th British Resident of Perak. Now named after Sultan Yusuf Izzuddin Shah, the 32nd Sultan of Perak. The historical Hongkong and Shanghai Banking Corporation building, Jan Sahib's office, Jaya Villas, and Mikasa Photo Shop are located along this street.
Brewster Road	波士打路 Bo Si Da Lou	Jalan Sultan Idris Shah	Formerly named after E J Brewster, District Officer of Kinta. Now named after Sultan Idris Shah, the 33rd Sultan of Perak.
Chamberlain Road	張伯倫路 Zoeng Baak Lun Lou	Jalan C.M. Yusuf	Formerly named after Joseph Chamberlain, Secretary of State for Colonies in the Coalition Government. Now named after C.M. Yusuf, the third Speaker of the Dewan Rakyat (lower house in the Malaysian Parliament).
Clare Street	吉利街 Gat Lei Gaai	Jalan Mustapha Al-Bakri	
Clarke Street	卡叻街 Ka Lak Gaai	Jalan Sultan Abdul Jalil	Formerly named after Dr Tertius Clarke, Health Officer of Kinta. Now named after Sultan Abdul Jalil, the 29th Sultan of Perak.
Clayton Road		Jalan S.P. Seenivasagam	Formerly named after R J B Clayton, who held many appointments in Perak. Now named after S. P. Seenivasagam.
Club Road		Jalan Panglima Bukit Gantang Wahab	A major road fronting the Royal Ipoh Club. Now named after Dato' Panglima Bukit Gantang Abdul Wahab, the first Menteri Besar of Perak. The historical Ipoh Town Hall building, Railway Station, Court House, State Medical and Health Office, Central Police Station, Royal Ipoh Club and Padang are located along this road.
Cockman Street	國民街 Gwok Man Gaai	Jalan Dato' Onn Jaafar	Formerly named in memory of Herbert James Cockman, Major of the 1st (Perak) Battalion, Federated Malay States Volunteer Force during the World War II. The street was previously named Togo Road after Japanese Admiral Togo, but quickly renamed after the war and the Japanese atrocities during the occupation. Now named after Dato' Onn Ja'afar, the founder of the United Malays National Organisation.
Connolly Road	十三閒 Sap Saam Gaan	Jalan Tun Perak	Formerly named after Dr R M Connolly, District Surgeon of Taiping and Ipoh. Now named after Tun Perak, a famous bendahara of the Malacca Sultanate.
Cowan Street	高溫街 Gou Wan Gaai	Jalan Raja Ekram	Formerly named after William Cowan, Protector of Chinese, Perak in Ipoh. Now named after Raja Ekram, Raja di-Hilir of Perak.
Cross Street		Jalan Silang	
Dairy Road		Jalan Raja Musa Mahadi	
Fryer Road		Persiaran Tun Perak	Formerly named after G W Fryer, Chief Construction Engineer of FMS Railways.
Greenhill Drive	青山道 Ching Saan Dou	Jalan Datuk Ahmad Said named after Datuk Ahmad Said, former Menteri Besar of Perak 1964-70.	
Hale Street		Jalan Tun Sambanthan	Formerly named after Abraham Hale (*1854, †1919), Collector of Land Revenue at K. L and Ipoh and author (The adventures of John Smith in Malaya, 1600-1605, Leyden 1909). Now named after V T Sambanthan the fifth president of the Malaysian Indian Congress and a cabinet minister in the 1950s and 1960s. The historical residence and law office of the Seenivasagam brothers and Ali Pitchay's townhouse are located along this street.
Hill Street		Jalan Koo Chong Kong	Formerly named after Valentine Hill, District Officer of Kinta and British Resident, Negeri Sembilan The road may have been so named because it scaled the highest point in Ipoh. Now named in memory of Koo Chong Kong, the chief police officer of Perak assassinated during the communist threat. This road had been renamed Jalan Tabung Haji in 2001 after the Tabung Haji building along the road but has since been renamed Jalan Koo Chong Kong. The historical Pakistani Mosque is located along this street.
Horley Street	賀利街 Ho Lei Gaai		Named after Reverend William Edward Horley, the Methodist minister who founded Ipoh's first schools.
Hugh Low Street	休羅街 Jau Lo Gaai (休羅 sounds like Hugh Low in the Hakka dialect)	Jalan Sultan Iskandar	Formerly named after Sir Hugh Low, the fourth British Resident of Perak. Renamed after Sultan Iskandar Shah, the 30th Sultan of Perak, in 1975.
Hume Street	棺材街 Gun Coi Gaai / 谦街 Him Gaai	Jalan Masjid	Formerly named after Colonel W J P Hume, the 11th British Resident of Perak. Now named for the historical mosque Masjid Panglima Kinta along this street.
Jelf Road		Regat Tun Perak	Formerly named after Sir A S Jelf, Chairman of Kinta Sanitary Board.
Leech Street	列治街 Lit Zi Gaai	Jalan Bandar Timah	Formerly named after J M B Leech, District Officer of Kinta. The historical Dramatists' Hostel is located along this road.
Leong Sin Nam Street	梁燊南街 Loeng San Nam Gaai / 点心街 Dim Sam Gaai	Jalan Leong Sin Nam	Named after Leong Sin Nam, a community leader and philanthropist during earlier days in the development of Ipoh.
Maxwell Road	麦斯威律 Mak Si Wai Leot	Jalan Tun Abdul Razak	Formerly named after Eric Maxwell. Now named after Tun Abdul Razak, the second Prime Minister of Malaysia.
Osborne Street	柯士文路 O Si Man Lou / 榴槤街 Lau Lin Gaai	Jalan Dato' Tahwil Azhar	Formerly named after Douglas Osborne, founder of the Osborne and Chappel mining company in Ipoh. Now named after Dato' Tahwil Azhar, the 15th Panlima Kinta.
Panglima Lane; Concubine Lane	二奶巷 Ji Nai Hong	Lorong Panglima	Formerly named for the brothels and residences of businessmen's concubines flanking the street.
Patrick Street		Persiaran Bijih Timah	Formerly named after Mr Patrick, the Assistant Inspector of Schools, Perak.
Pike Street		Jalan Kledang	
Post Office Road		Jalan Dato' Sagor	A road near the main post office in Ipoh. Now named after Dato' Sagor Ngah Kamdin, a Malay nationalist who revolted with Dato' Maharaja Lela and was his relative. The historical Birch Memorial and Municipal Car Park are located along this road.
Sheikh Adam Street		Jalan Sheikh Adam	Named after Sheikh Adam who founded the first aerated water factory in Kinta, and later an ice factory.
Station Road		Jalan Dato' Maharaja Lela	A road near Ipoh railway station. Now named after Dato' Maharaja Lela Pandak Lam, a pembesar of Perak and Malay nationalist. The historical Chung Thye Phin building, S.P.H. De Silva building, Mercantile Bank building, The Chartered Bank building, and Leong Yew Koh's legal firm are located along this road.
Sturrock Road		Jalan Sturrock	Named after A J Sturrock, District Officer, Kinta.
Thomson Road		Jalan Tun Dr Ismail	Formerly named after H W Thomson, the 17th British Resident of Perak. Now named after Tun Dr Ismail， the second Deputy Prime Minister of Malaysia.
Tiger Lane	老虎巷 Lou Fu Hong	Jalan Sultan Azlan Shah	From junction with Jalan Raja Dr. Nazrin Shah to junction with Jalan Raja Dihilir and Jalan Tambun.
Treacher Street	地理者街 Dei Lei Ze Gaai / 咸鱼街 Haam Ju Gaai	Jalan Bijih Timah	Formerly named after Sir William Hood Treacher, the sixth British Resident of Perak and second Resident General of the Federated Malay States.

== See also ==
- List of roads in Kuala Lumpur
- Street names of George Town, Penang
- Transportation in Seremban
