= Panorama Melaka =

Defunct bus operator in Malacca, Malaysia

Panorama Melaka Sendirian Berhad
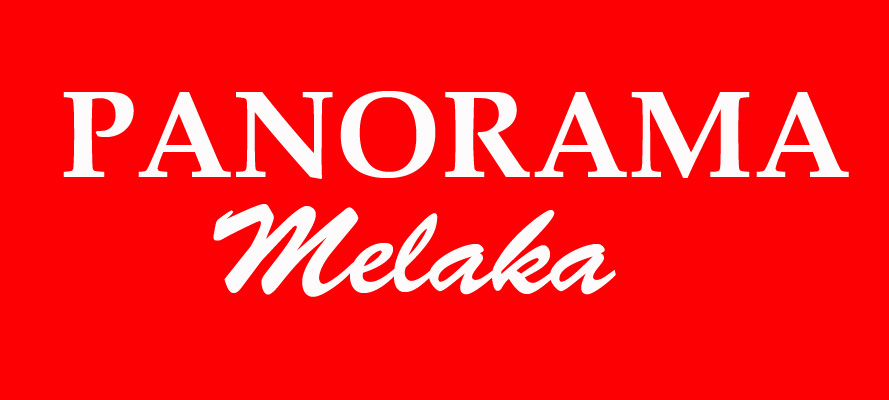
- Company type: Private limited company
- Founded: 1989
- Defunct: January 20, 2025; 16 months ago
- Headquarters: Lot 19B & 19C Zone B, Bangunan Terminal , Melaka Sentral, Jalan Tun Abdul Razak, Peringgit, 75300 Melaka, Malaysia
- Area served: Melaka
- Services: Bus service
- Website: panoramamelaka.com.my

Panorama Melaka was a Melaka state-owned public bus operator. During its height, they were the major bus operator in the state, providing stage bus services statewide.

== History ==
Panorama Melaka was initially known as Pulau Besar (Malacca) Island Resort Sendirian Berhad. The company was established on the 10 January 1989. However, on 10 May 1991, its name was changed to the Syarikat Kemajuan Perlancongan Melaka Sendirian Berhad. On 18 August 1999 it was changed again as PM Cultural & Tourism Sendirian Berhad. On 8 March 2012, the Board of Directors has unanimously decided to give the name Panorama Melaka Sendirian Berhad.

On 1 February 2012, the company acquires all private local bus operators for the aim to modernise the public transportation system in Melaka. The entire Melaka bus routes, minus a few, were effectively under the company later on, carrying the Panorama Melaka branding.

However in 2024, it was announced that the company were to be closed in January 2025, citing continuous loss and unefficient management. All bus services under the company was later transferred to Handal Indah, which would operate it under the Stage Bus Service Transformation scheme under the BAS.MY Melaka brand.

== Routes ==
These was the routes operated by Panorama Melaka during its height. Most of the routes were later transferred to Handal Indah as BAS.MY routes (except Muar and Tangkak which are later under Mayang Sari).

| Route number | Origin | Destination | Service type | Notes |
|---|---|---|---|---|
| 1A | Melaka Sentral | Tampin | Trunk | Via Cheng, Bertam Malim and Alor Gajah |
| 1B | Melaka Sentral | Tampin | Trunk | Via Ayer Keroh, Durian Tunggal and Melaka Pindah |
| 2 | Melaka Sentral | Krubong | Trunk | |
| 6A | Melaka Sentral | Muar | Trunk | via Merlimau |
| 8 | Melaka Sentral | Tangkak | Trunk | via Jasin |
| 9A | Melaka Sentral | Jasin | Trunk | |
| 11 | Melaka Sentral | Masjid Tanah | Trunk | via Klebang and Tangga Batu |
| 15 | Melaka Sentral | Bukit Rambai | Trunk | |
| 16 | Melaka Sentral | Alor Gajah | Trunk | |
| 18 | Melaka Sentral | Kuala Linggi | Trunk | |
| 20 | Melaka Sentral | Pengkalan Kempas | Trunk | |
| 21A | Melaka Sentral | Batang Melaka | Trunk | Makes stops at Gading and Selandar. |
| 21B | Melaka Sentral | Batang Melaka | Trunk | Makes stops at Tebong |
| 24B | Melaka Sentral | Ayer Keroh (Melaka International Trade Centre) | Trunk | |
| 25 | Melaka Sentral | Bukit Katil | Trunk | |
| 17 | Melaka Sentral | Banda Hilir | Feeder | Goes through the historical sites of Melaka. Loop service. |
| 22 | Melaka Sentral | Tengkera and Limbongan | Feeder | Loop service |
| 23 | Melaka Sentral | Bachang Baru | Feeder | |
