= Transport in Seremban =

The city of Seremban, Negeri Sembilan, Malaysia is linked by rail from KTMB's Seremban station to Kuala Lumpur, Singapore and the coastal town of Port Dickson (ceased operations in 2008), and has a commuter rail network. It lacks its own airport and is served by the nearby Kuala Lumpur International Airport. Local and longer-distance bus services use a bus station at Terminal 1 Bus Terminal and Shopping Centre, Negeri Sembilan's primary transportation hub. Major roads include Federal Route 1, Federal Route 51, Federal Route 86, Federal Route 366, North–South Expressway Southern Route (E2), Kajang-Seremban Highway (E21), Seremban-Port Dickson Highway (E29), and the Seremban Inner Ring Road (SIRR). The major streets in the city have been renamed since colonial days.

== Intracity transport ==
=== Rail ===
==== Commuter rail ====
Seremban KTM railway station.

The rail connection was first constructed in the late 1890s as a stop on the Kuala Lumpur–Singapore main line, and until today, the Seremban railway station still serves as one of the major stops along the line. This station also serves as the southern terminal of the Keretapi Tanah Melayu electrified commuter network, KTM Komuter, which links the town to Kuala Lumpur and the Klang Valley on Seremban Line. Seremban station also serves as the terminal for the Seremban–Port Dickson railway line, one of Malaysia's oldest railway lines, built during the colonial era. However, today, this route is less frequently used.

=== Road ===
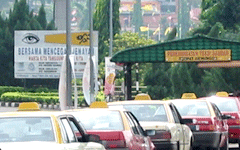
Taxis in Seremban

==== Trunk road ====
The Malaysia Federal Route 1, the oldest major roadway that connects the major towns and cities of the West Coast of Peninsular Malaysia runs through Seremban. It connects Seremban with neighbouring towns such as Rembau and Tampin to the south and Kajang, Selangor to the north. Seremban also provides access to the towns of Kuala Klawang and Kuala Pilah to the east and the well-known coastal town of Port Dickson to the west.

==== Highway ====
- North–South Expressway: The North–South Expressway (Malaysia) runs through the town. Seremban is well-connected by road to other nearby Malaysian cities such as Malacca and Johor Bahru to the south and Kuala Lumpur to the north. Drivers can exit to Seremban town via 3 interchanges: (from north to south) Seremban, Port Dickson and Senawang. As of year 2005 until 2007, PLUS will be expanding the 2-lane Seremban section highway to 3 lanes in order to ease traffic during peak hours and festive seasons.

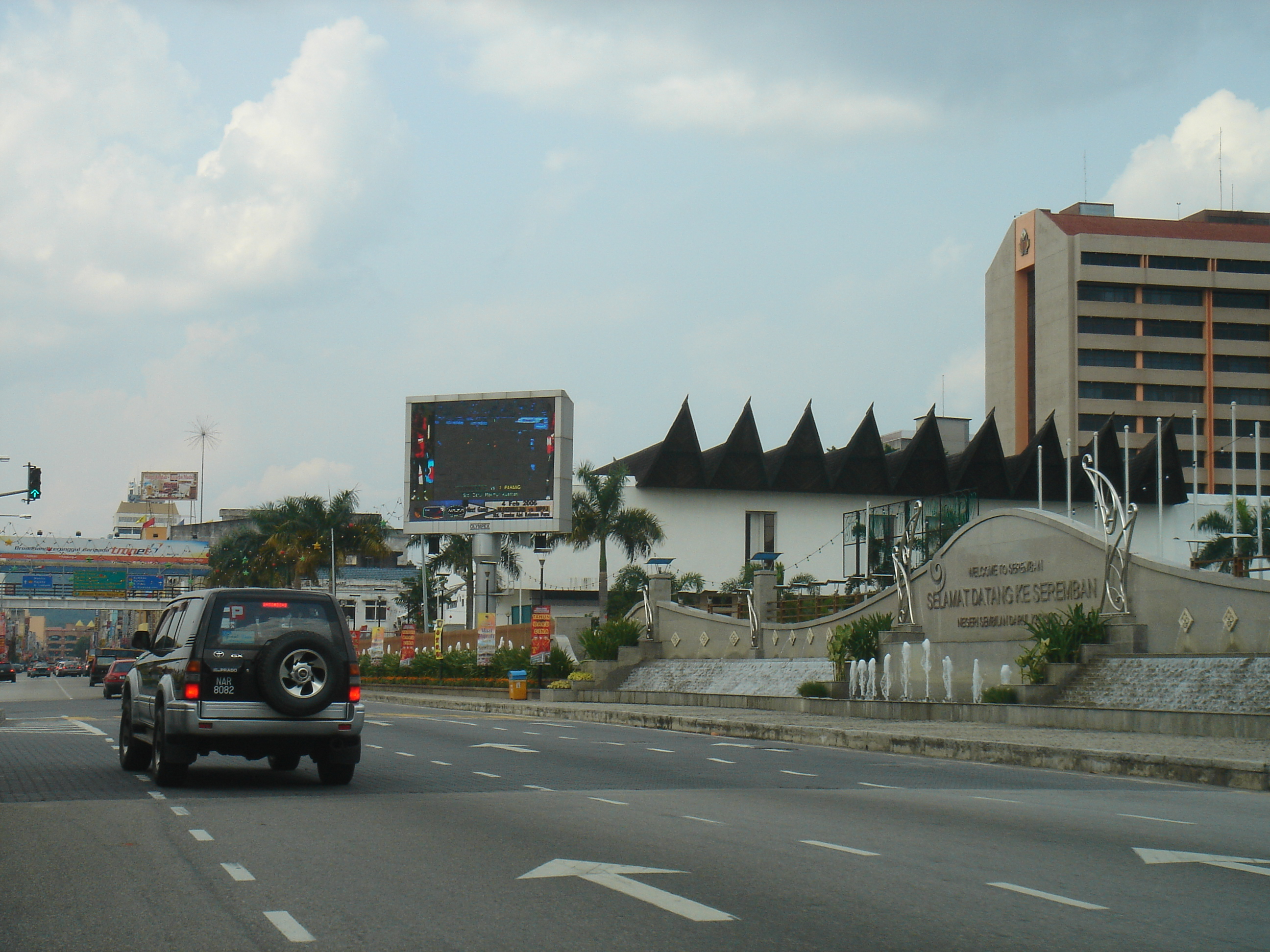
Main road in Seremban

- Seremban–Port Dickson Highway: The Seremban–Port Dickson Highway, which ends in Seremban, provides a faster but a tolled alternative route to Port Dickson. The highway connects Port Dickson, Lukut and Bandar Springhill to Seremban.

The Public Works Department has also begun the construction of the Seremban Inner Ring Road which will help alleviate traffic flow in and out of the town centre, which is frequently congested during the peak hours. One of the phases of the project includes widening and building a viaduct on Jalan Rasah (completed) and Sikamat to Senawang, the main road connecting residential areas along the Seremban–Port Dickson route with the city centre.

==== Inner city road ====
Like Ipoh and Taiping, Seremban town's street composes primarily of grid based layouts that begins and ends on the outer fringes of the town area. Additionally, a series of additional roads were formed throughout much of the town's Lake Gardens, curving around the park. Many of the town's streets were originally referred to in English with a handful of Malay street names included in the mix. Several streets were named after local landmarks, but others were predominantly named after prominent Federated Malay States officials, especially those who served in Negeri Sembilan. Following the passing of the National Language Act in 1967, the street names were first translated in Malay, while many were further renamed later, removing traces of colonial connotations. Many of the renamed streets are currently named in honour of local figures.

Former name	Current name	Notes
Bathurst Road	Jalan Bukit (literally translated as Hill Road)	
Birch Road	Jalan Dato Bandar Tunggal	Originally known to be named after Ernest Woodford Birch, the fifth Negeri Sembilan Resident, and renamed after Sungai Ujong chieftain Dato' Bandar Kulop Tunggal. The road runs across the centre of the town, from the Seremban railway station to the old town mosque on the other end of town limits.
Cameron Street	Jalan Lee Fong Yee	
Campbell Street		Originally known to be named after Douglas Graham Campbell, the eighth Negeri Sembilan Resident.
Carew Street	Jalan Dr. Krishnan	
Church Road	Jalan Gereja	
Circular Road	Jalan Keliling and Jalan Singkat (literally translated as Shortcut Road)	
Dunman Road	Jalan Tuan Haji Satu	
Jalan Dato Klana	Jalan Dato Kelana Ma'Amor	Dato' Kelana is a Sungai Ujong chieftain title. As a result, the origins of the street name is unknown as several past chieftains carry the title. The street name was renamed to commemorate a specific Dato' Kelana, Dato' Kelana Ma'Amor.
Egerton Road	Jalan Penghulu Cantik	Originally known to be named after Walter Egerton, the sixth Negeri Sembilan Resident.
Gaol Road	Jalan Sasaran	
Labu Road	Lebuhraya Persekutuan	Originally part of an inter-town road linking Seremban to Labu.
Lake Road	Jalan Taman Bunga (Literally translated as Flower Park Road)	A Lake Gardens road originally named due to the presence of lakes along the west side of the road.
Lemon Street	Jalan Tuanku Munawir	Originally known to be named after Arthur Henry Lemon, the tenth Negeri Sembilan Resident, and renamed after the late Yang di-Pertuan Besar of Negeri Sembilan Tuanku Munawir.
Lister Road	Jalan Dato Hamzah	Originally known to be named after Martin Lister, the first and fourth Negeri Sembilan Resident.
Locke Road	Jalan Lt. Adnan	Renamed after Adnan bin Saidi, a local war hero in World War II.
Market Road	Jalan Dato Abdul Malek	
Murray Street	Jalan Tun Dr. Ismail	
Paul Street	Jalan Yam Tuan	Originally known to be named after W.F.B. Paul, the second Negeri Sembilan Resident. The road is a major thoroughfare that runs from the northern end of the town, south towards an inter-town road leading to Port Dickson.
River Road	Jalan Kang Seng	Originally named after a river (Sungai Temiang) and runs in front of the road's western end.
Station Road / Jalan Hose	Jalan Zaaba	Originally named after the presence of the Seremban railway station, the street was later named after Edward Shaw Hose, the twelve Negeri Sembilan Resident.
Temiang Road	Jalan Temiang	Named after Sungai Temiang, a river that runs along the east side of the road.
Temple Road	Jalan Berhala (Idol Road)	Originally named after a local Hindu Temple beside the road.
Jalan Tuan Sheikh	Jalan Dato Sheikh Ahmad	
Walligh Street	Jalan Dr. Murugesu	
Wilkinson Street	Jalan Dato Abdul Rahman	Originally known to be named after Richard James Wilkinson, the ninth Negeri Sembilan Resident.
Wise Road	Jalan Dato Muda Linggi	

=== Bus Service ===
Free bus in Seremban

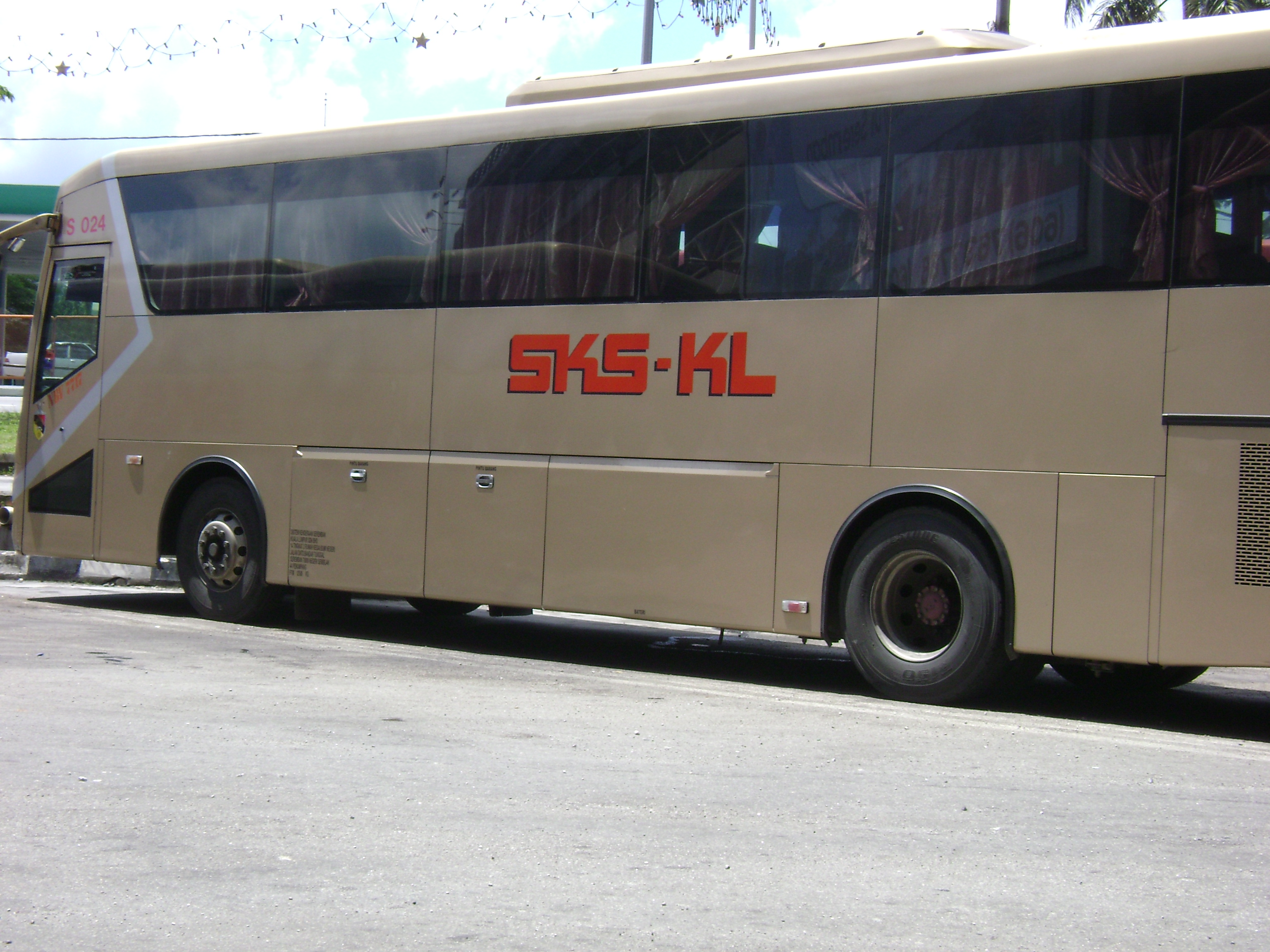
Sistem Kenderaan Seremban

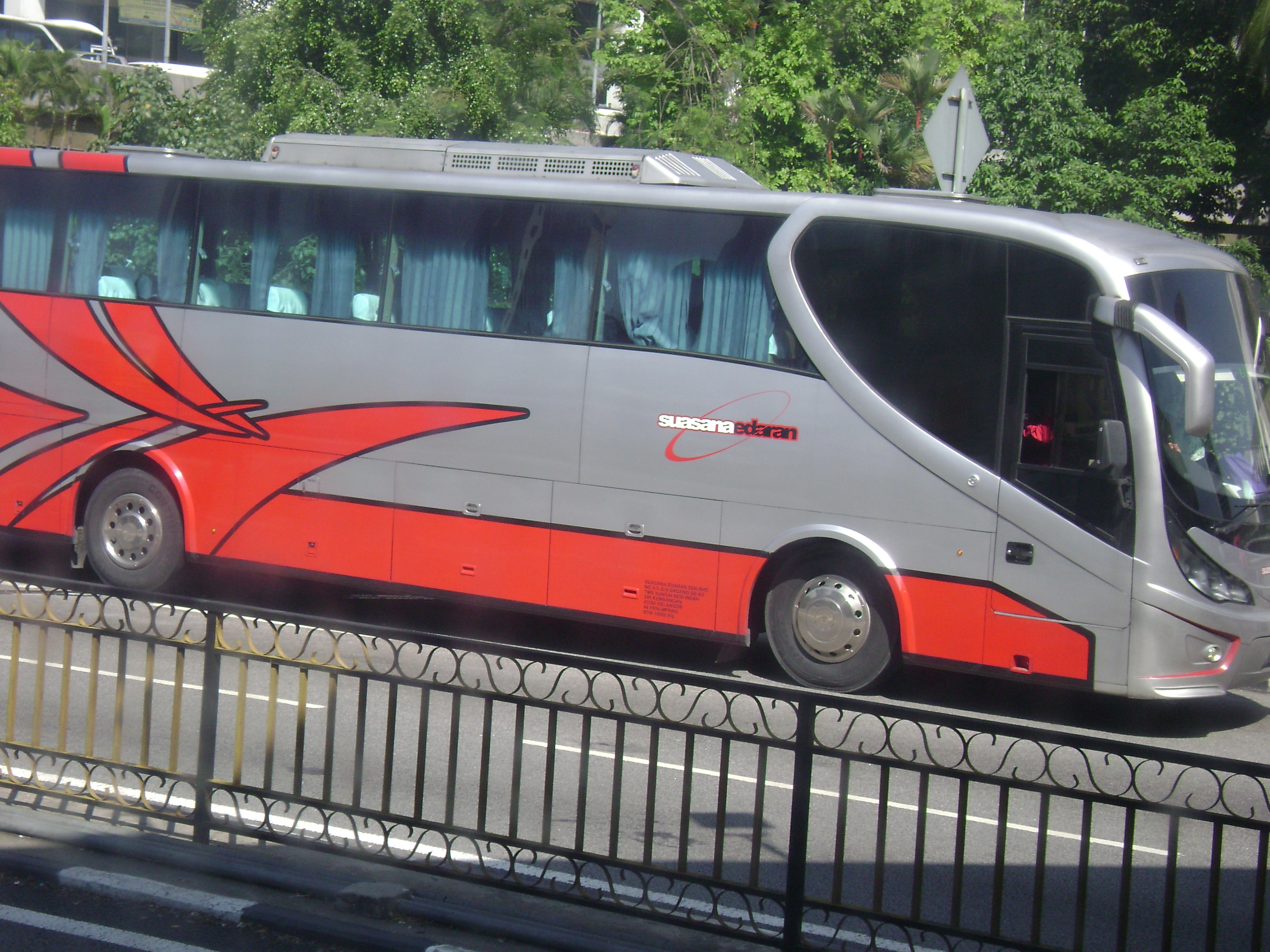
Suasana Edaran bus

Bus service in Seremban is rather poor compared to other cities around the country before the bus network revamp, resulting in heavy congestion in Seremban. The main bus terminal in Seremban is situated at Terminal 1 Shopping Centre. It is located on Jalan Lintang, which provides stage bus services to residents from outlying towns under BAS.MY branding in Negeri Sembilan, such as Port Dickson, Bahau, Jelebu and Tampin. There are frequent express bus services by companies such as Sistem Kenderaan Seremban and Suasana Edaran from Seremban to Kuala Lumpur and Malacca. The city council also offers free shuttle bus service, however due to the bus service not being received well by locals, the city council was decided to stop the service, while being brought back by Pakatan Harapan government. The BAS.MY service provide a quality and punctual local bus services in Seremban.

Code	Route	Operator
N05	Terminal 1 Seremban - Bukit Mutiara	BAS.MY (KR Travel & Tours)
N508	Terminal 1 Seremban - Desa Rhu	BAS.MY (KR Travel & Tours)
N513	Nilai - USIM	BAS.MY (KR Travel & Tours)
N10A	Terminal 1 Seremban - Bahau via Juasseh	BAS.MY (Gopi Travel Tour)
N10B	Terminal 1 Seremban - Bahau via Batu Kikir	BAS.MY (Gopi Travel Tour)
N30A	Terminal 1 Seremban - Port Dickson via Springhill	BAS.MY (Gopi Travel Tour)
N30B	Terminal 1 Seremban - Port Dickson via Simpang Siliau	BAS.MY (Gopi Travel Tour)
N31	Terminal 1 Seremban - Pekan Linggi	BAS.MY (Gopi Travel Tour)
N50	Terminal 1 Seremban - Nilai via Mantin	BAS.MY (KR Travel & Tours)
N51	Nilai - Nilai 3	BAS.MY (KR Travel & Tours)
N52	Terminal 1 Seremban - Nilai via Labu	BAS.MY (KR Travel & Tours)
N53	Terminal 1 Seremban - Port Dickson via Rantau	BAS.MY (Gopi Travel Tour)
N54	Terminal 1 Seremban - Seremban 2	BAS.MY (KR Travel & Tours)
N56	Terminal 1 Seremban - Politeknik Nilai	BAS.MY (KR Travel & Tours)
N57	Nilai - KLIA T1 / T2	BAS.MY (KR Travel & Tours)
N60A	Terminal 1 Seremban - Tampin via Senawang	BAS.MY (Southern)
N60B	Terminal 1 Seremban - Tampin via Seremban Jaya	BAS.MY (Southern)
N70	Terminal 1 Seremban - Kuala Klawang / Titi	BAS.MY (Gopi Travel Tour)

Major bus companies operating in Seremban include:

- Sistem Kenderaan Seremban
- Suasana Edaran
- Plusliner
- Cepat Express
- Mara Liner
- Statecoach
- Cityliner

== Port infrastructure ==
=== Airport ===
Negeri Sembilan is one of the two states in Malaysia that are not accessible via air transportation (Perlis being the other state). However the Kuala Lumpur International Airport (KLIA) is less than a 30 minutes drive from Seremban, essentially making the airport closer to Seremban rather than Kuala Lumpur.

== See also ==
- Transportation in Malaysia
- Rail transport in Malaysia
- KTM Intercity
- Road Transport Department Malaysia
