= Melaka Sentral =

Bus terminal in Malacca, Malaysia

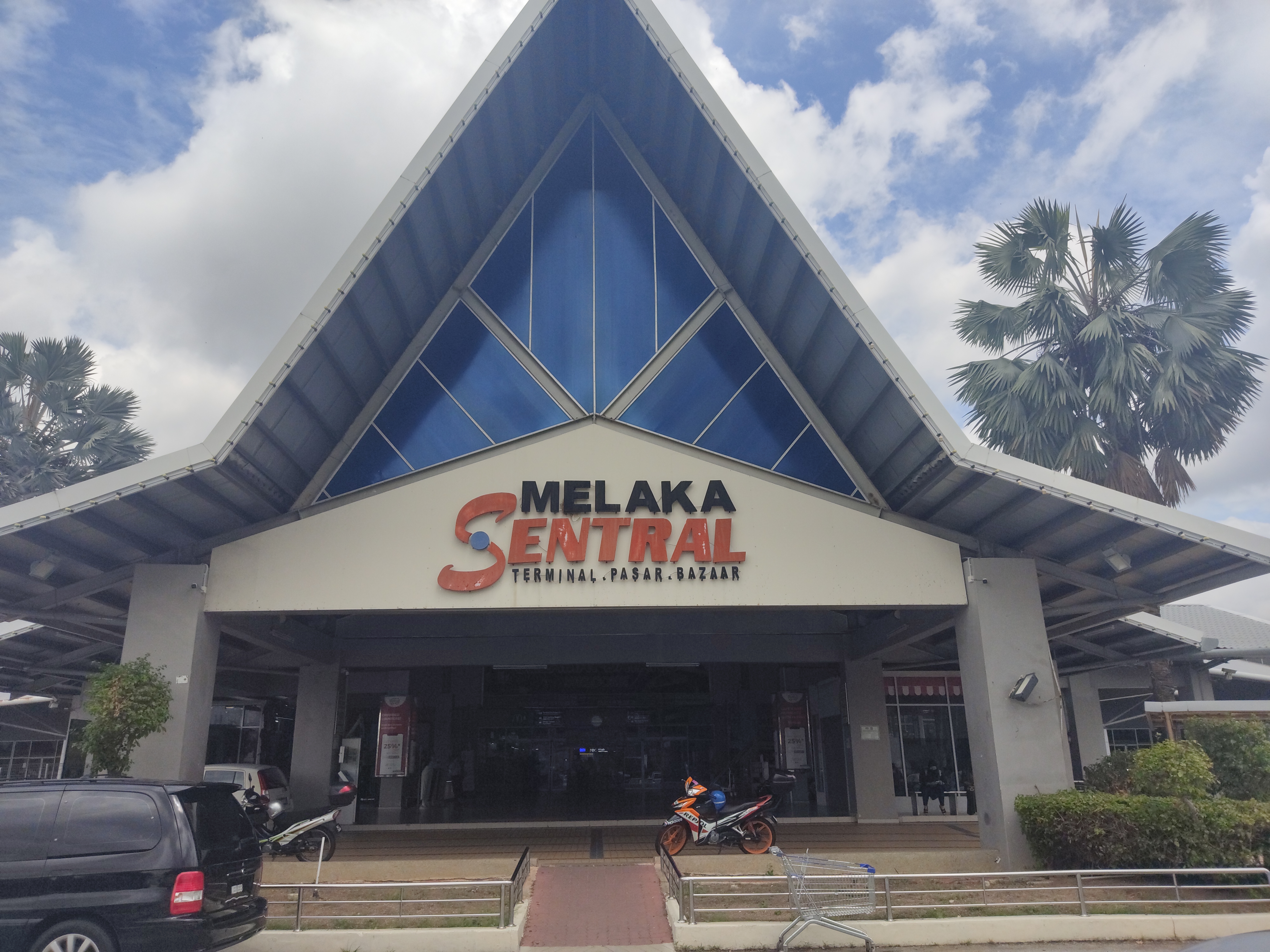
- Main entrance of Melaka Sentral

General information
- Location: Jalan Tun Razak, Peringgit, Malacca, Malaysia
- Coordinates: 2°13′18″N 102°15′0″E
- System: Inter-city and local bus terminal
- Owner: Melaka Sentral Sdn Bhd (subsidiary of Malacca State Development Corporation)
- Platforms: 24 (inter-state), 18 (domestic)

Construction
- Structure type: At-grade
- Parking: Yes (RM0.60/hour, RM5/day; 24-hour security)
- Cycle facilities: Yes (dedicated lanes and racks)
- Accessible: Yes (wheelchair-accessible facilities)

Other information
- Website: melakasentral.com.my

History
- Opened: 14 May 2004; 22 years ago
Location

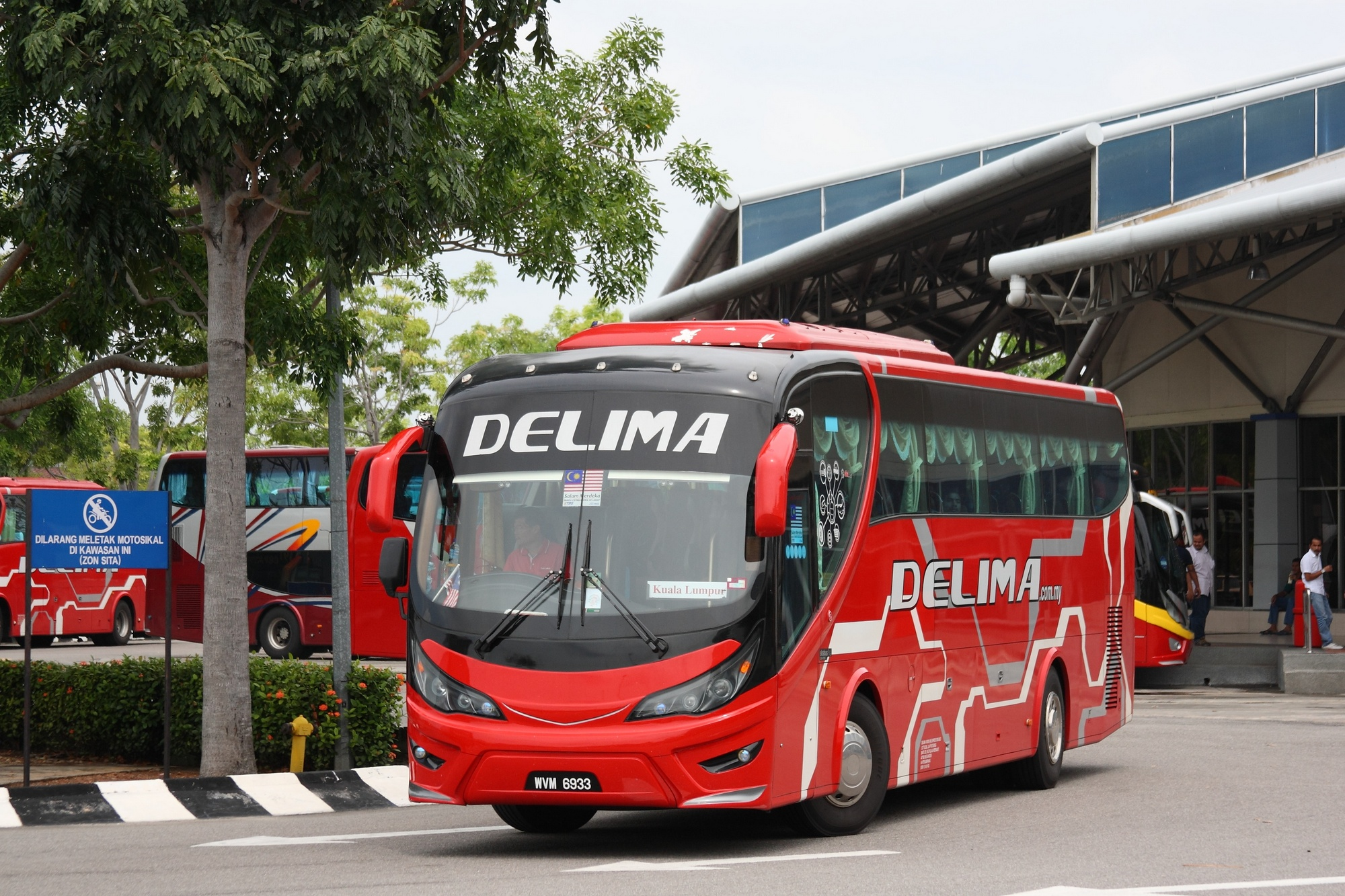
Bus at Melaka Sentral platform

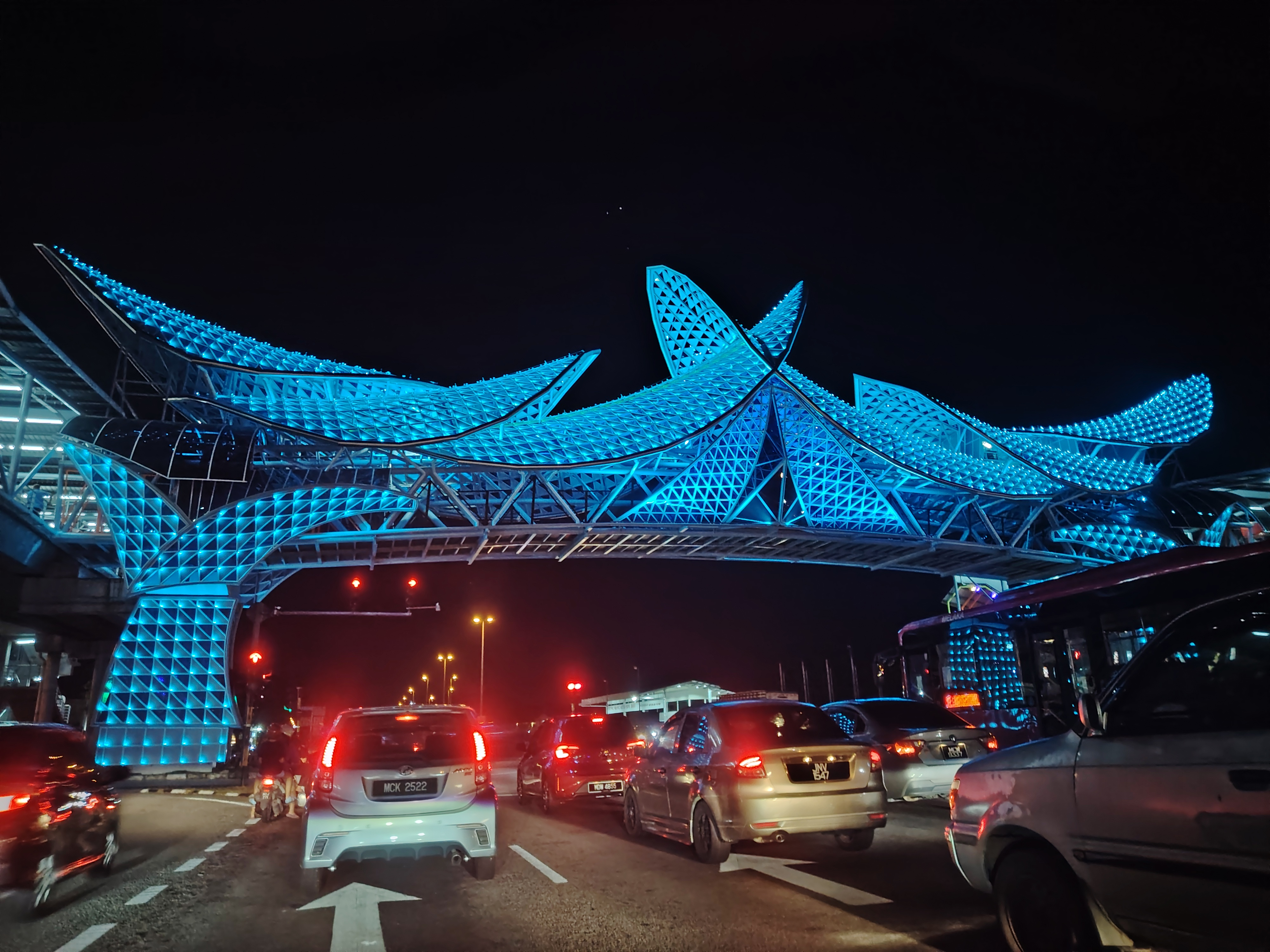
Link bridge in 2025.

Melaka Sentral (Note: Bus station uses the Malay language spelling of the state's name, as opposed to the more traditional English language spelling of its name, "Malacca") is the largest public transportation terminal in Malacca, Malaysia. It occupies 46.6 hectares of land and located between AMJ Highway (Jalan Tun Abdul Razak) and Jalan Panglima Awang and was opened on 14 May 2004. The construction of the bus terminal costed RM610,000 and begun in February 2003 and completed in the following year. It was constructed with high roofs which allows sunlight to reach the inside of the terminal building and based on the design of Kuala Lumpur International Airport (KLIA). The bus terminal is linked to Lotus's Peringgit and Seri Cempaka retail area by an octobus linkbridge.

== History ==
In January 2024, the upgrade of link bridge was planned out.

== Routes ==
Code	Route	Operator
MSTG005	Melaka Sentral - Tangkak via Jasin	Mayang Sari
MSML003	Melaka Sentral - Muar	Mayang Sari
M100	Bandaraya Melaka Feeder	BAS.MY Melaka (Causeway Link)
M101	Pasar Melaka Feeder	BAS.MY Melaka (Causeway Link)
M10A	Melaka Sentral - MITC/UTEM via Batu Berendam	BAS.MY Melaka (Causeway Link)
M10C	Melaka Sentral - MITC via Bukit Beruang	BAS.MY Melaka (Causeway Link)
M11	Melaka Sentral - Bukit Katil	BAS.MY Melaka (Causeway Link)
M12	Melaka Sentral - Batu Berendam / Airport	BAS.MY Melaka (Causeway Link)
M13	Melaka Sentral - Taman Inang Sari	BAS.MY Melaka (Causeway Link)
M14	Melaka Sentral - Bertam Ulu	BAS.MY Melaka (Causeway Link)
M15	Melaka Sentral - Pulau Gadong	BAS.MY Melaka (Causeway Link)
M16	Melaka Sentral - Paya Luboh	BAS.MY Melaka (Causeway Link)
M17	Melaka Sentral - Tangga Batu	BAS.MY Melaka (Causeway Link)
M20 / M20X	Melaka Sentral - Tampin via Alor Gajah/AMJ Highway	BAS.MY Melaka (Causeway Link)
M21 / M21X	Melaka Sentral - Tampin via Alor Gajah/Durian Tunggal	BAS.MY Melaka (Causeway Link)
M22	Melaka Sentral - Bandar Vendor/UniKL	BAS.MY Melaka (MARA Liner)
M23	Melaka Sentral - Masjid Tanah/Pengakalan Balak	BAS.MY Melaka (Causeway Link)
M30	Melaka Sentral - Batang Melaka via Selandar	BAS.MY Melaka (Causeway Link)
M31	Melaka Sentral - Batang Melaka via Tebong	BAS.MY Melaka (Causeway Link)
M32	Melaka Sentral - Jasin	BAS.MY Melaka (Causeway Link)

== See also ==
- Transport in Malaysia
