= SMKA Tun Ahmadshah =

Tun Ahmadshah Islamic High School
- Sekolah Menengah Kebangsaan Agama Tun Ahmadshah
- PO Box A-235, Inanam; Kota Kinabalu, Sabah, 88856; Malaysia

Information
- School type: Government Boarding national religious secondary school
- Motto: Berilmu, Beramal, Bertaqwa (Knowledgeable, Practical and Pious)
- Religious affiliation: Islam
- Established: 1 January 1988
- Status: Open
- Supervising body: State Education Department
- School code: XRA 4002
- Principal: Ustazah Rosnani Sidin
- Teaching staff: 49
- Employees: 13
- Grades: Form 1 to Form 5
- Age range: 12-17
- Enrollment: 451 (2016)
- Classes offered: General knowledge, Islamic study, Science and Accountancy
- Schedule type: Schedule
- Schedule: Normal schedule: 6.45 am – 1.45 pm Additional schedule: 2.30 pm – 4.30 pm
- Hours in school day: 6–8
- Classrooms: 17
- Houses: 4
- Nickname: SMKA TUNAS; SEMAI
- Website: smkatunas.net

Sekolah Menengah Kebangsaan Agama Tun Ahmadshah (formerly known as SMKA Inanam) is a religious school in Kota Kinabalu, Sabah, Malaysia. The school was established in 1988.

== History ==
SMKA Inanam was initiated on 1 January 1988 as a normal secondary school. The first batch of the school consisted of 14 teachers and 455 students led by the first Principal, Mr. Matshah Abdul Hamid. At the end of 1988, a proposal to make this school an Islamic secondary school was moved as the original Islamic secondary school in Ranau was under construction. State Education Department was in favour of such proposal as this school is located strategically near administrative centre.

Consequently, 20 teachers and a number of students of Form 5 and Upper Form 6 from SMKA Limauan joined this school on 3 January 1989, while the school, which was known as SMK Inanam, was renamed as SMKA Inanam. It was renamed once again to SMKA Tun Ahmadshah on 9 September 2009 in commemoration of the then-Governor of Sabah, Ahmadshah Abdullah who was a native Bajau hailing from the Inanam township or suburb of Kota Kinabalu city.

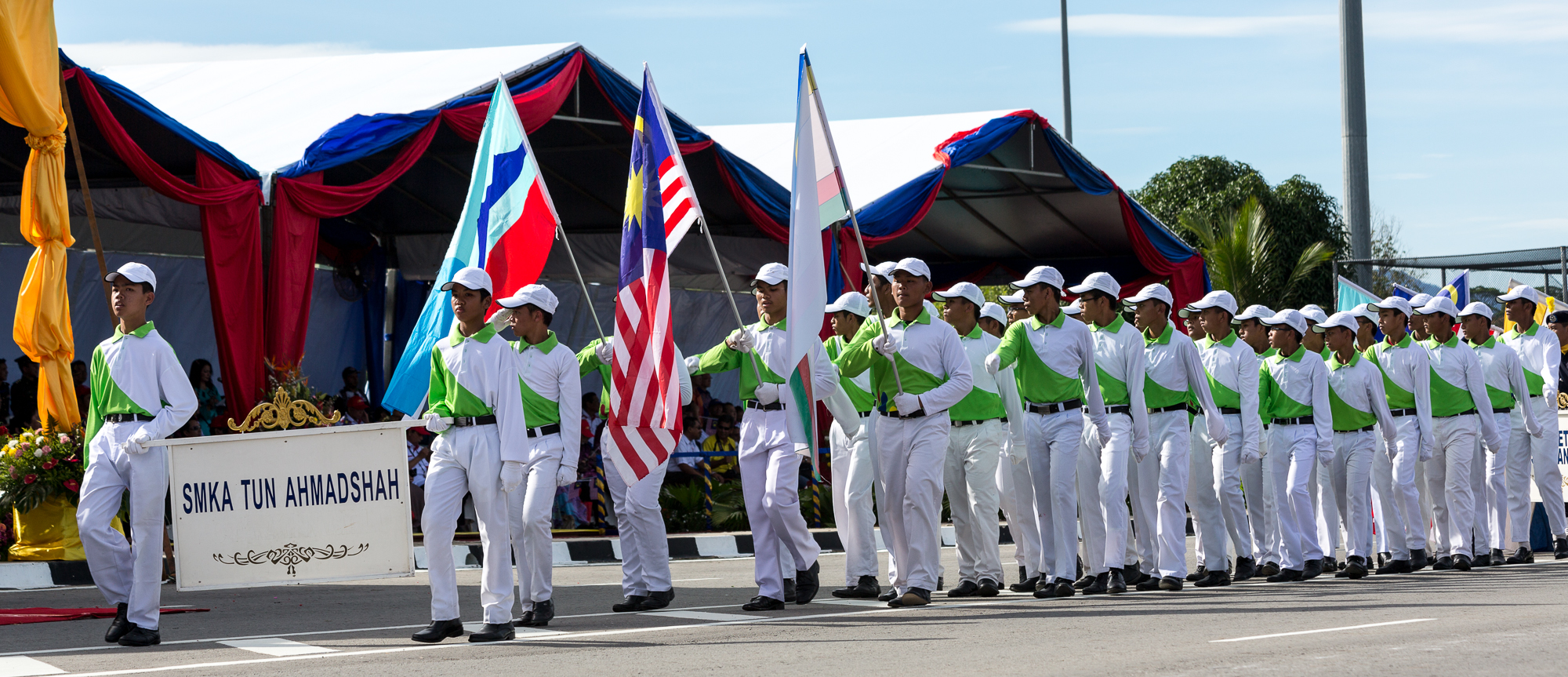
Hari Merdeka 2013 Parade

== Roll of principals ==
Principal	Period
Ustaz Salehuddin Hj. Mansur	1989 - 1992
Ustaz Mohd Isa Hj. Shaari	1992 - 1994
Ustazah Hjh. Arpah Mohammad	1994 - 2005
Ustaz Idrus Hj. Abdul Rahman	2006 - March 2008
Ustazah Affida Helmi	January 2009 - March 2011
Dr. Hj. Mohd. Kassim Tusin	May 2011 - January 2016
Datin Hasnah Mohd. Yakob	January 2016 - December 2017
Ustaz Zulkifli Mohammad	December 2017 - January 2022
Ustazah Rosnani Sidin	February 2022 – present
