= Kuala Lumpur Mini-Bus Service =

Public bus service in Malaysia

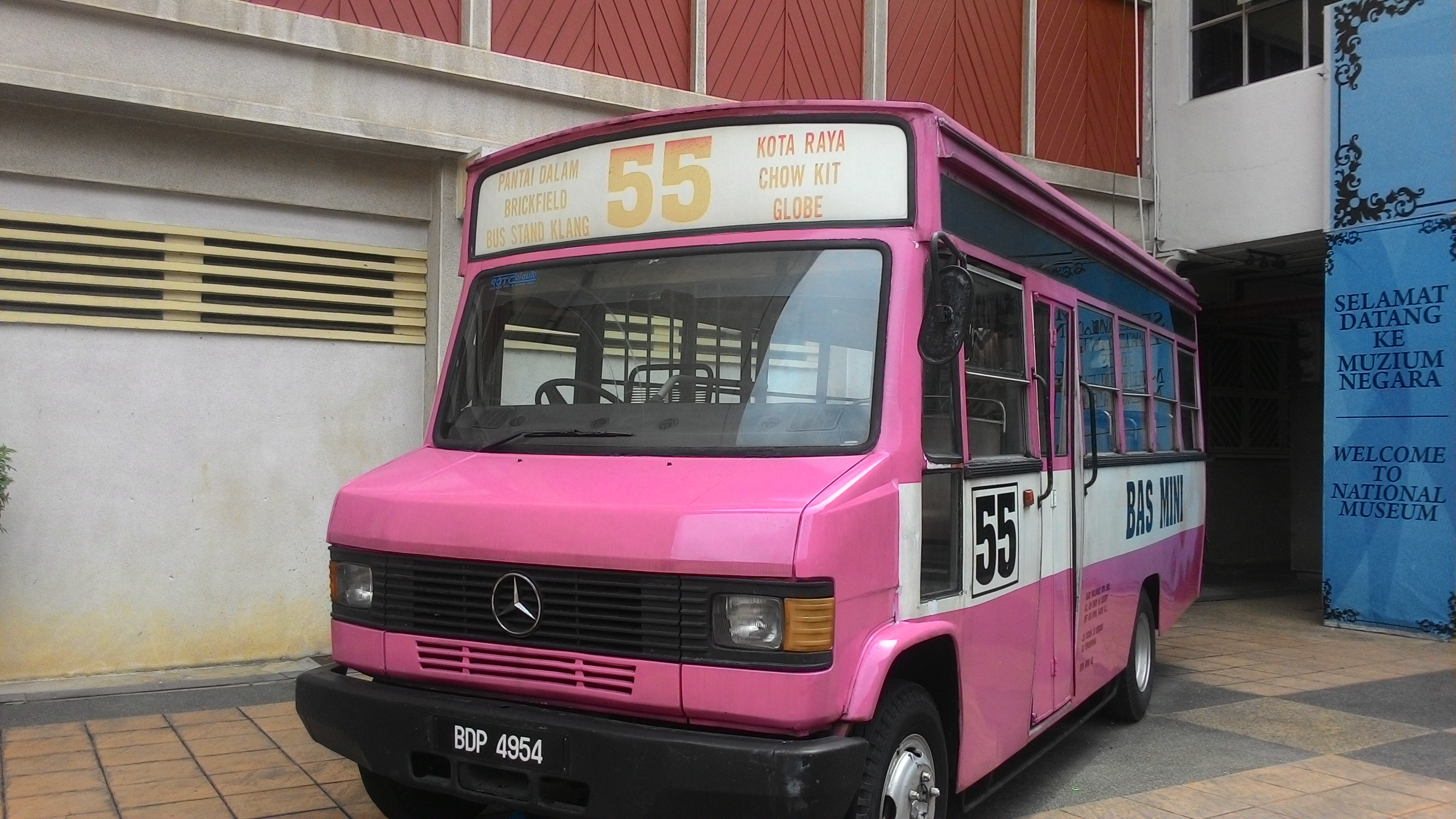
Discontinued Kuala Lumpur Mini-Bus at Muzium Negara.

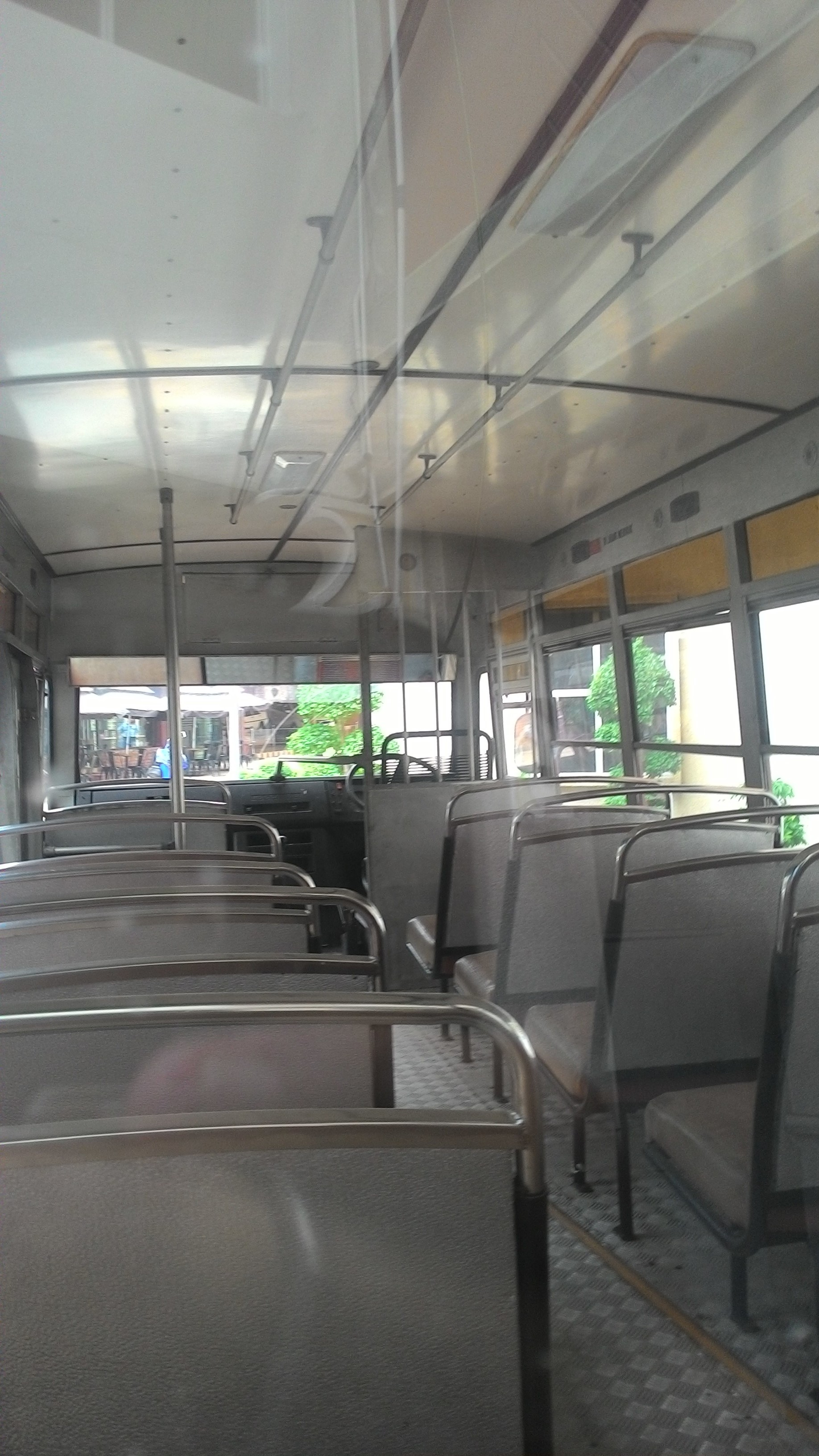
Interior of Kuala Lumpur Mini-Bus

The Kuala Lumpur Mini-Bus Service or Bas Mini was one of the oldest and popular Malaysian public bus service, having served in Kuala Lumpur and the Klang Valley region. The buses were primarily painted pink with a white stripe on the sides, and had a capacity of 20-30 passengers, due to its smaller size. The bus operated on a commission basis, with service operators being paid according to the fare they collected.

The mini-bus service was discontinued from 1 July 1998 onwards, to be replaced by the Intrakota bus service and later, RapidKL buses in 2005.

== Brief history ==
The mini bus started operating on 23 September 1975 under the Ministry of Transportation. At that time, the mini bus operated on various routes according to their individual colours (blue-white, yellow-white, red-white, purple-white and dark green-white). The mini bus was responsible for servicing nearly sixty different routes. Three major companies (Syarikat Kerjasama Pengaman (M) Bhd, Bas Mini Wilayah and Konsortium Pengusaha Bas Mini Sdn Bhd) monopolized the various bus routes while smaller operators were allowed to service certain areas only.

In 1975, when the mini bus was introduced as a service, the bus-fare was just 40 sen. Later in 1991, the fare was increased to 50 sen while two years after, the fare was again adjusted to 60 sen. The mini bus did not have any fixed time-table. Instead, the service operated on a commission basis whereby the operators were paid according to the number of trips and fare collection they could raise in one day. Sometimes, in order to outdo a competitor, a driver would detour from the designated route much to the annoyance of the passengers.

In 1990, the then Deputy Minister of Transport, Datuk Paduka Rahmah Osman, standardized the colour of the mini bus to pink and white. On 1 July 1998, the services of the mini bus was terminated in the city of Kuala Lumpur. Once a notorious mode of transport for the many commuters in Kuala Lumpur, the "Pink Lady" will always be remembered for its death-defying activities on public roads.

== See also ==
- RapidKL
- Public transport in Kuala Lumpur
