= City Bus Terminal (North), Kota Kinabalu =

Bus station in Malaysia

City Bus Terminal (North)
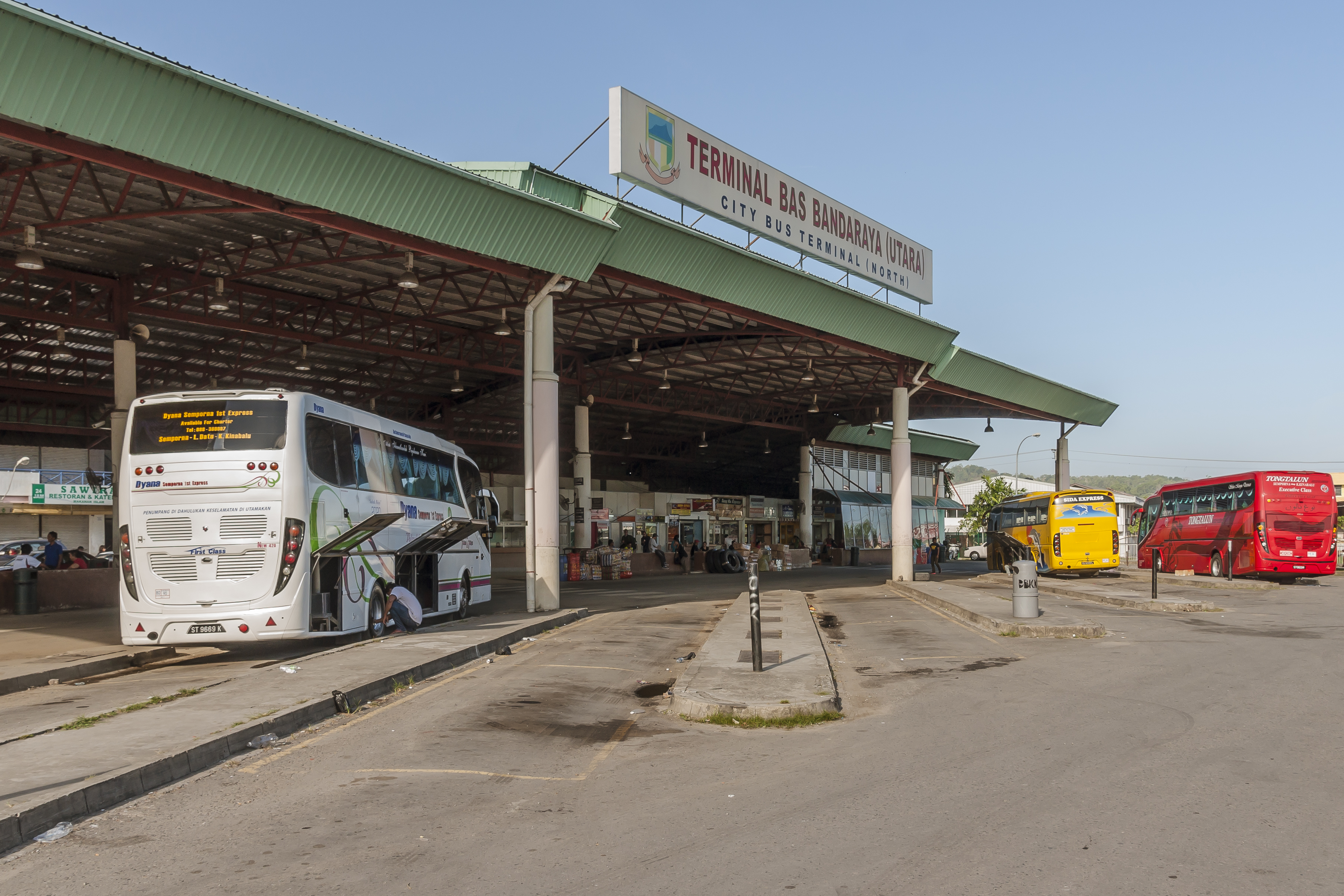
- View of the bus terminal

General information
- Location: Mile 6, Jalan Tuaran, Inanam, 88400 Kota Kinabalu, Sabah, Malaysia
- Coordinates: 5°59′39″N 116°7′43″E
- Owner: Kota Kinabalu City Hall

History
- Opened: 15 January 2006; 20 years ago
Location

City Bus Terminal (North) (Terminal Bas Bandaraya (Utara), also informally known as Terminal Inanam) is a major express bus terminal in Kota Kinabalu, Sabah. It serves mainly intercity bus routes to East Coast regions of the state, mainly Sandakan and Tawau.

The terminal is located in Inanam town, which is 10 kilometres from Kota Kinabalu city centre.

== History ==
This centralised bus terminal for Sabah's northern and east coast sectors in Inanam started operation on Jan 15, 2006. This terminal helps to improve efficiency in the public transport system in Sabah besides easing congestion in the city. This centralised bus terminal for the northern and east coast sector was built at a cost of RM4.5 million and had a capacity of up to 80 buses at any one time.
