= Miri City Smart Bus =

The Miri City Smart Bus is a free public bus network serving Miri, Sarawak, Malaysia. The service is operated by Miri City Bus Sdn Bhd as part of a public transport initiative supported by the Miri City Council (MCC) and the Ministry of Transport Sarawak (MOTS). Trial operations commenced in October 2024.

The network consists of eight routes operated by a fleet of 14 Volvo B8RLE low-entry buses. The buses are equipped with amenities including free Wi-Fi, real-time GPS tracking, LED route displays and low-floor wheelchair ramps. The eight routes serve Permyjaya, Taman Tunku, Senadin, Tudan, Miri Hospital, Sungai Rait–Bakam, Kuala Baram and RTM.

The service is integrated with the Sarawak Smart Transport App (SSTA), which provides passengers with live bus locations, estimated arrival times and route information. Miri City Bus became the first public transport operator to implement the SSTA platform in November 2025.

More than 1.3 million passenger journeys had been recorded on the network by 30 April 2026.

== Routes ==
The routes operate from the Pelita Tunku bus station in central Miri. The Ministry of Transport Sarawak identifies the location as Bus Station (Pelita).

Route	Destination	Service type	Operator	Notes
01	Kuala Baram	Loop (except the last bus schedule)	Miri City Bus	
13+15	Sungai Rait+Bakam	Loop (except the last bus schedule)	Miri City Bus	Coastal route serving Luak Bay and Bakam Point.
26	Taman Tunku	Loop (except the last bus schedule)	Miri City Bus	
33	Miri Hospital	Loop (except the last bus schedule)	Miri City Bus	Direct service to Hospital Miri Grab pickup zone via Jalan Padan Kerbau.
37	RTM	Loop (except the last bus schedule)	Miri City Bus	Serves Pujut Corner to Pujut 4 residential areas
62	Permyjaya	Loop (except the last bus schedule)	Miri City Bus	High-frequency route serving Permy Mall, Bandar Baru Permyjaya and Emart Tudan.
66	Senadin	Loop (except the last bus schedule)	Miri City Bus	Serves Curtin University Malaysia and Nam Leong supermarket.
68	Tudan	Loop (except the last bus schedule)	Miri City Bus	Serves Emart Tudan and Kampung Tudan

== Service ==
The buses operate according to individual vehicle schedules. Consequently, routes assigned more than one bus have staggered departure times throughout the day. According to schedule data provided through the Sarawak Smart Transport App, the 14 buses collectively provide 91 scheduled departures per day across the eight routes. (Note: Departure times shown in the Sarawak Smart Transport App may be revised by the operator.)

Scheduled departures
Route	Bus	Scheduled departures from Pelita Tunku
Tudan	QM3382Q	05:30, 06:40, 09:10, 11:45, 14:45, 17:30
Tudan	QM3362Q	06:20, 08:15, 10:45, 13:15, 16:00, 19:00
Permyjaya	QM3384Q	05:30, 06:30, 08:30, 11:00, 13:10, 15:30, 17:45
Permyjaya	QM3375Q	06:20, 07:30, 09:30, 12:00, 14:15, 16:45, 18:45
Permyjaya	QM3367Q	06:45, 08:00, 10:30, 12:30, 15:00, 17:15, 19:30
Permyjaya	QM3395Q	05:55, 07:00, 09:00, 11:30, 13:40, 16:10, 18:15
Senadin	QM3345Q	06:10, 07:30, 09:40, 12:30, 15:30, 18:30
Senadin	QM3379Q	05:30, 06:40, 08:40, 11:15, 14:15, 17:15
Sungai Rait–Bakam	QM3370Q	05:30, 07:30, 10:30, 13:30, 17:30
Taman Tunku	QM3357Q	06:10, 07:30, 09:30, 12:00, 14:15, 17:10, 19:00
Taman Tunku	QM3346Q	05:30, 06:30, 08:40, 10:40, 13:30, 16:00, 18:00
Kuala Baram	QM3372Q	06:00, 08:30, 11:30, 14:30, 17:15
RTM	QM3394Q	06:00, 07:15, 08:45, 10:30, 12:30, 14:15, 16:15, 18:00
Miri Hospital	QM3374Q	06:00, 07:15, 08:45, 10:30, 12:30, 15:00, 17:15

== Technology ==
The Sarawak Smart Transport App uses GPS and Internet of Things equipment installed on the buses to provide live vehicle locations and route monitoring. The platform also incorporates passenger-counting cameras and provides operational and ridership information to the bus operator and the Ministry of Transport Sarawak.

In December 2025, Miri became the first city in Malaysia to implement a bus signal priority system for its smart bus service. The system is integrated with the Sydney Coordinated Adaptive Traffic System (SCATS) and can provide approaching buses with priority at equipped traffic signals.
