= BRT Kota Kinabalu =

The BRT Kota Kinabalu is a bus rapid transit (BRT) project to improve bus services in the city of Kota Kinabalu. An allocation of around MYR1 billion has been provided by the Malaysian government under the 2016 Malaysian Budget to implement the project. Currently, the project is under studies between the federal and state governments and it was predicted to be finished in 2020. It has also been lauded by the Prasarana Malaysia, the government-owned company specialise in bus and light metro development, the Chief Minister of Sabah, Musa Aman and various other politicians who said they have been waited for almost 10 years.

As of April 2024, there is still no BRT in sight in the Kota Kinabalu area.
