= Rungus people =

Indigenous ethnic group of Borneo

Momogun Rungus
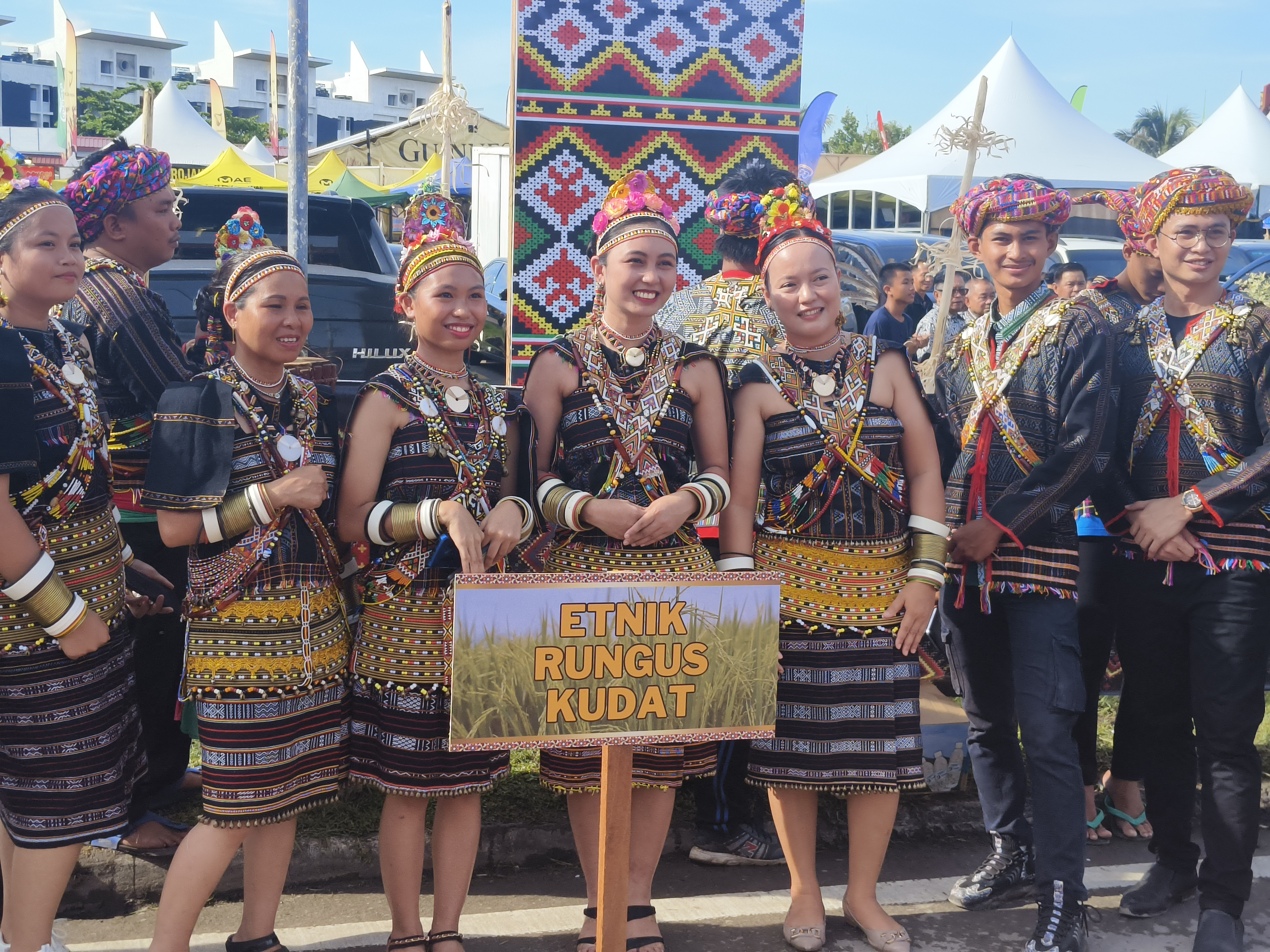
- Rungus people in their traditional costumes

Total population
- ≈74,000 (2024)

Regions with significant populations
- Malaysia (Sabah, Labuan)

Languages
- Native; Rungus; Also; Various other Dusunic • Sabah Malay • Standard Malay • English

Religion
- Christianity (majority Protestant, some Catholic) (70%), Islam (Sunni) and Animism (Traditional religion) (30%)

Related ethnic groups
- Dusunic related peoples; (Kadazan; Dusun; Kwijau; Paitan; Tatana; Lotud; Brunei Dusun; Kadazan-Dusun); Dayak • Iban • Melanau • Lun Bawang/Dayeh • Murut • Kedayan • other Austronesian peoples

The Rungus people, also known as the Momogun Rungus, are an Austronesian ethnic group indigenous to Sabah, Malaysia. They primarily live in the northern Kudat Division (within both the Kudat and Bengkoka peninsula), especially in the districts of Kudat, Kota Marudu and Pitas, with small minorities also existing in the Beluran and Telupid districts on the east coast of the Sandakan Division and within the Kota Kinabalu District (such as on Gaya Island) of the western coast of the West Coast Division as well as in the Federal Territory of Labuan. They have a distinct language, dress, architecture, customs and oral literature from other Dusunic sub-groups, with an estimate of around 74,000 Rungus people spread across the state aside from their native ranges.

The Rungus are considered among Sabah's most traditional ethnic groups, and they are renowned for their rich cultural heritage. Originally pagan-animist, a majority of them have converted to Protestantism, while the remainder either adhere to other branches of Christianity or to Islam, or else remain with their traditional religion. Their traditional dress is black in colour, and they are known for the unique pinakol beadwork, which distinguishes them from the other indigenous ethnic groups of Sabah.

== Etymology ==
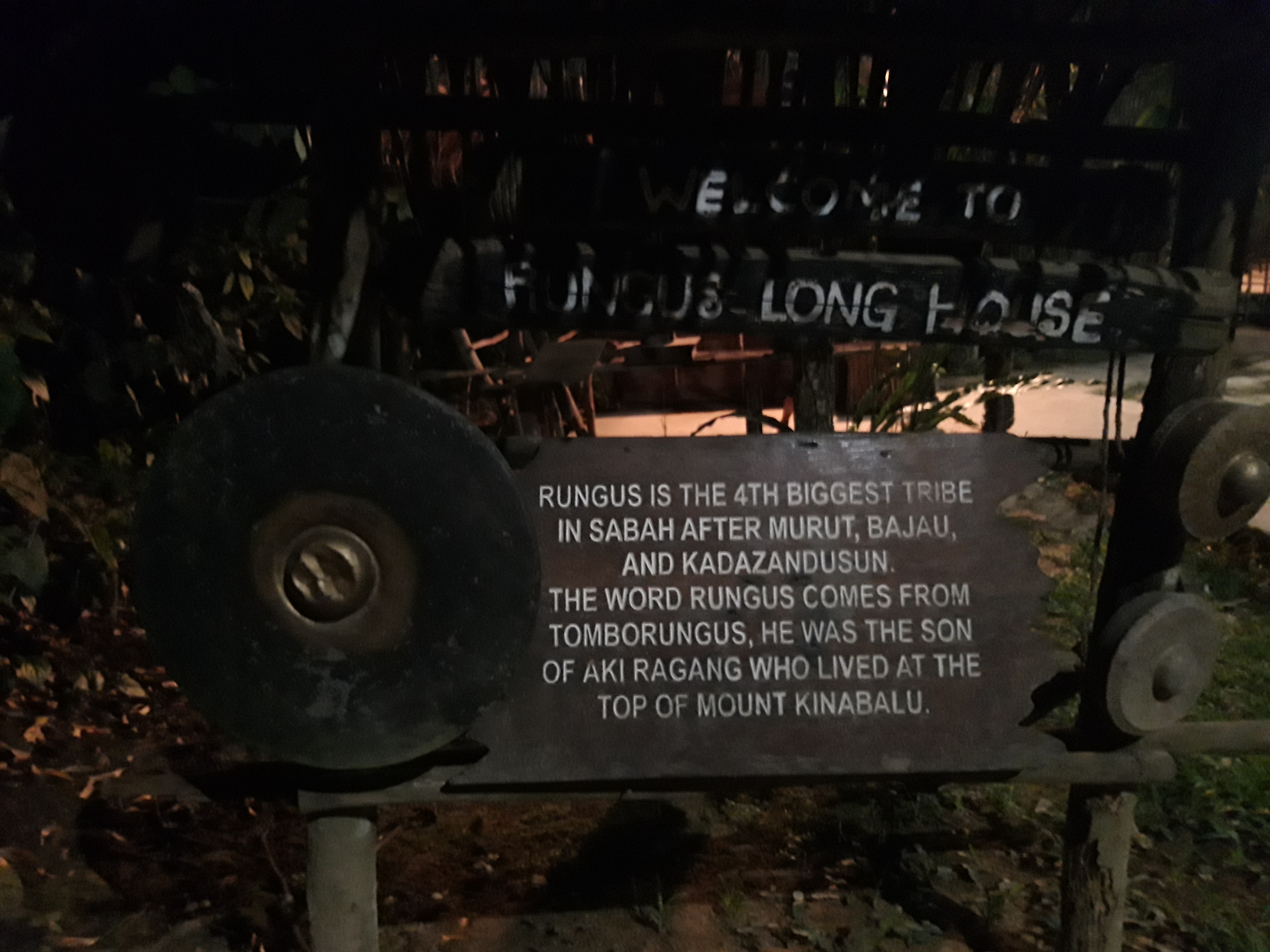
Rungus tribe sign at the Mari Mari Cultural Village in Inanam, Kota Kinabalu District

The Rungus ethnic group is one of Sabah's indigenous ethnic groups that are grouped into the larger Kadazan-Dusun indigenous group with unique native status, which is generally known as the "Momogun". Rungus ethnic scholars asserted that the word "Rungus" originated from the word "Rungsud", a Rungus ethnic forefather who migrated from the Nunuk Ragang area to the coast of the Kudat Peninsula, Marudu Bay, Pitas, Beluran, and as far as Telupid. These ethnic scholars also believe that "Rungsud" was a "Sea Momogun" figure who began to explore and subsequently inhabit the Kudat-Bandau area in ancient times, which partly became the origin for the Rungus to identify themselves as Momogun or Momogun Rungus, since the concept of Momogun itself refers to the name of the Rungus ethnic group. Oral sources also mention that the term "Rungus" for the ethnic group in Kudat comes from both the Bajau and Suluk languages, namely from the word "Ungus", which can be interpreted in the Malay language as "pasir" (sand).

== Background history and origin ==
The Rungus are Bornean indigenous people who lived around the hills of Kudat Division at the tip of Sabah, which is a sub-group of the largest indigenous of Kadazan-Dusun. Based on the research by Rungus ethnic scholar, the Rungus legend states that Rungsud or more well known as Aki Rungsud was the main figure who opened the Bandau-Kudat area as the largest barter trading area in the Berungus Cape and Bandau Bay region of Borneo in ancient times. Bandau Bay is known as the site of the ancient Rungus trading centre, where the usual goods traded in the bay are cassava, bananas, corn, pumpkins, forest products, Rungus woven cloth, and various other trade items. The ethnic are among the most traditional ethnic group in Sabah, with their culture revolves around rice; however, coconut and banana groves provide cash income. Women weave cloth on backstrap looms, and make containers from vine or beadwork. Rungus modern society have now work in town, with many have abandoned the communal life of the longhouse. Within the federation of Malaysia, the Rungus are considered as one of Sabah Bumiputeras.

=== "Out of Taiwan" origin theory ===
Together with the Dusun, Kadazan, and Bajau, the Rungus are believed to have origins linked to the Austronesian migration known as the Out-of-Taiwan theory. According to this theory, the ancestors of the Rungus were among the early Austronesian-speaking peoples who migrated from Taiwan Island thousands of years ago. These migrants, often referred to as the Taiwanese aborigines, gradually spread southward across the Philippines and into Borneo.

=== Rungus in the Nunuk Ragang legend ===
The story of Rungus people within the Nunuk Ragang according to Rungus beliefs is more connected to their Labus religion development. Both the Kadazan and the Rungus shared a settlement near Nunuk Ragang, an area that had the presence of white sand, or tangar-tangar, and was situated between two rivers, which they called pirungusan. Hence, the Kadazan were referred to as the Tangaa, Tanggara or Tangara, and the Rungus derived their name from the word pirungusan. Based on the origin story of the Rungus people, Aki Nunuk Ragang is the one who founded the human settlement within their origin place, although the story is not widely accepted by other Dusun tribes since the others claim that the first humans in Nunuk Ragang were a husband and wife who were involved in an incident where a ship or barge broke down in the Labuk River. Most Dusun folklore believed that Aki Nunuk Ragang has several children, such as Gorudin, Lintobon, Longguwai, Tinggoron, Tomui, and Turumpok, although based on each of their personal stories, it is concluded that they are community leaders. From the Rungus stories' perspective, the Rungus were led by Rungsud, Longguvai, and Turumpok; the Rungsud led the Rungus tribe, while Longuvai led the Tangara (Kadazan) tribe. (Note: In the Rungus version of the story, Aki Nunuk Ragang only had three children, namely Rungsud (the eldest), Longuvai and Turumpok who remained in Nunuk Ragang. In the Kadazan or Tanggara version of the story, Aki Nunuk Ragang is known as Aki Maragang and has sons named Runsud, Longguvai, Tomui and a daughter named Sayap respectively. The spelling of the name of Runsud in Rungus is Rungsud while Longguvai is spelt as Longguwai by the Dusuns and Longuvai by the Kadazans.) Aside from their migration from the Nunuk Ragang being caused by crowded issues, both the Rungus and Tanggara Kadazan tribes claimed to have been entrusted by Lumaag Nabalu to guard the coast from being encroached upon by newer communities that came to North Borneo. The Rungus have a very close relationship with the Kadazan tribe since Gonsomon came from the Tangara tribe itself, through Bulun, who is one of the children of Longguvai.

== Culture ==
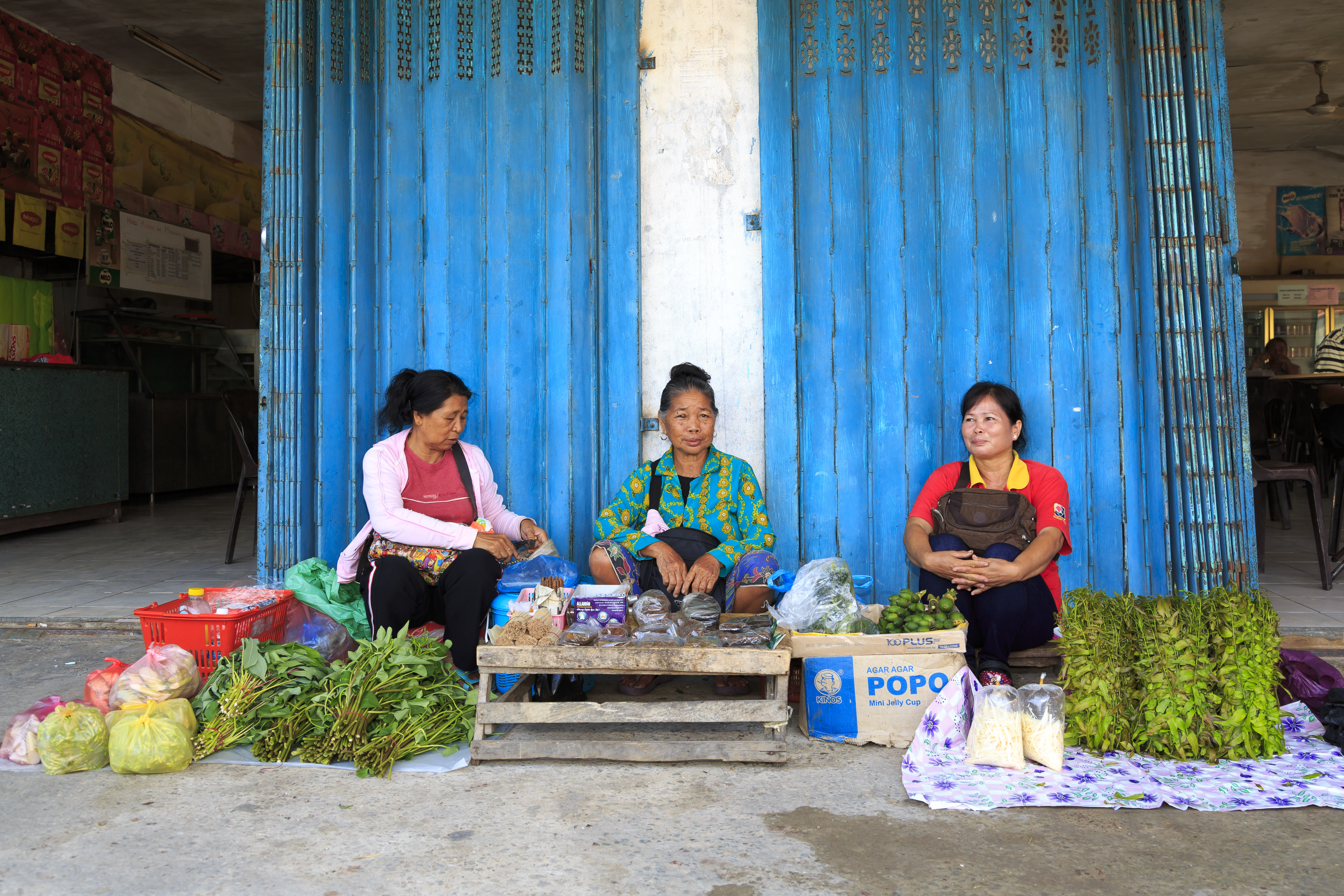
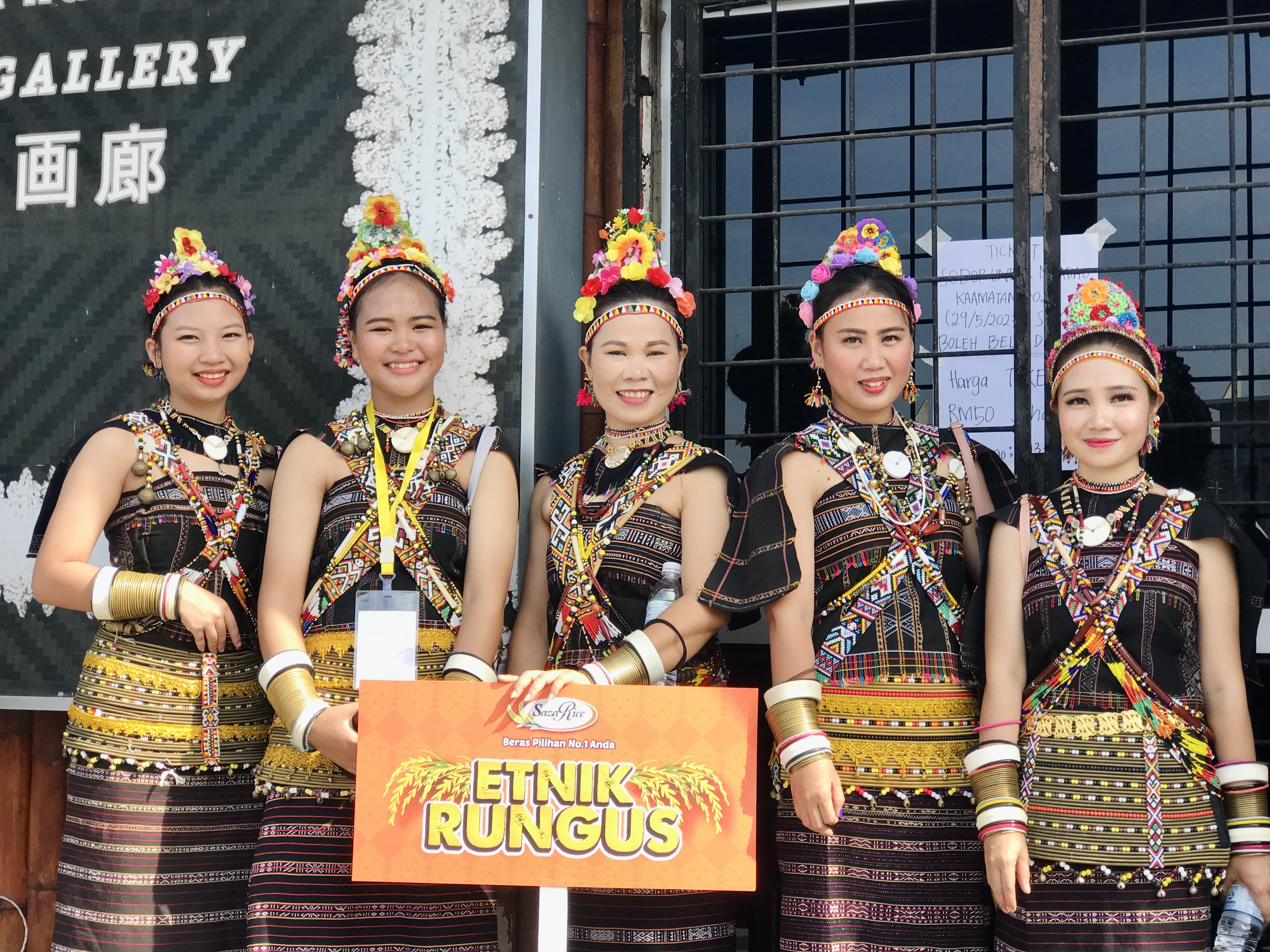
From left to right: Three Rungus women selling home-produced products in Sikuati Town of Sabah, Malaysia and Rungus female in traditional attire

As among the most traditional ethnic groups in Sabah, the Rungus are renowned for their rich cultural heritage, where they engage in traditional practices with traditional ceremonies, music, language, and medicinal knowledge, agricultural activities, and former communal living in longhouses. The Rungus are well known for their intricate bead art of pinakol, traditional black clothing with brass ornaments, rice farming culture that also resulted in traditional beliefs with three classes of supernatural beings: the Osunduw (God), Rogon (spirit), and Odu-odu (rice spirit), coconut and banana groves as well as bee-rearing in Gombizau Village of Matunggong and their gong-making in Sumangkap Village that is commonly paired with their traditional dances with unique music. Their cultural performances with a blending of traditional culture and recent time are shown in places such as Bavanggazo longhouse and Tinangol Village.

=== Cuisine ===
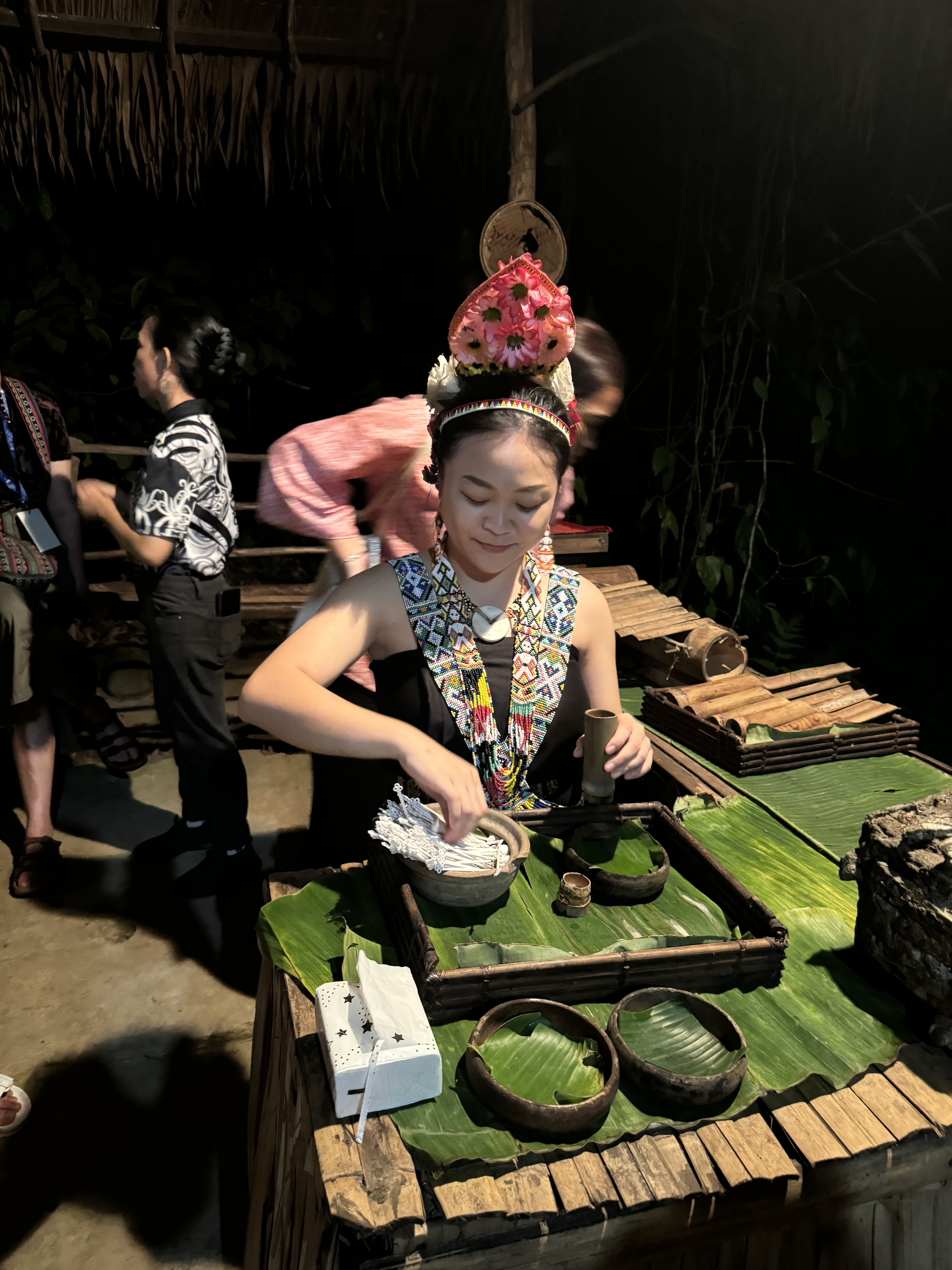
A Rungus female preparing the traditional drink of tinonggilan and other traditional foods

Rungus cuisine is mainly prepared using cooking methods like braising, grilling and baking. Being a community of fishermen and farmers, the staple foods of the Rungus people usually consists of rice and cassava, supplemented with green vegetables and fish. Linopot is a rice dish wrapped in leaves that is common among the Rungus as well as the entire Dusunic and Murutic community, while tinunuvan soguntung is the Rungus term for a preparation of grilled or roasted eggplant. The cooked eggplant is peeled, and served with chillies, lime juice, toasted anchovies or salted fish, and sprigs of lompodos (a local variety of basil). Tinonggilan is a slightly sparkling alcoholic drink made from maize. Akin to the Latin American corn beer, Tinonggilan is a Rungus speciality and is usually served during festive occasions, or as refreshments for guests during the performance of a ritual dance called Mongigol Sumundai. The Rungus also prepare simple sweet foods for breakfast or as daily snacks such as flatbread made from sweetened grated cassava (tinopis runti) and bintanok dalai (mashed corn kuih), or mashed corn wrapped and steamed in corn husks as well as bintanok runti (mashed cassava kuih), and bintanok punti (mashed banana kuih).

=== Festival ===
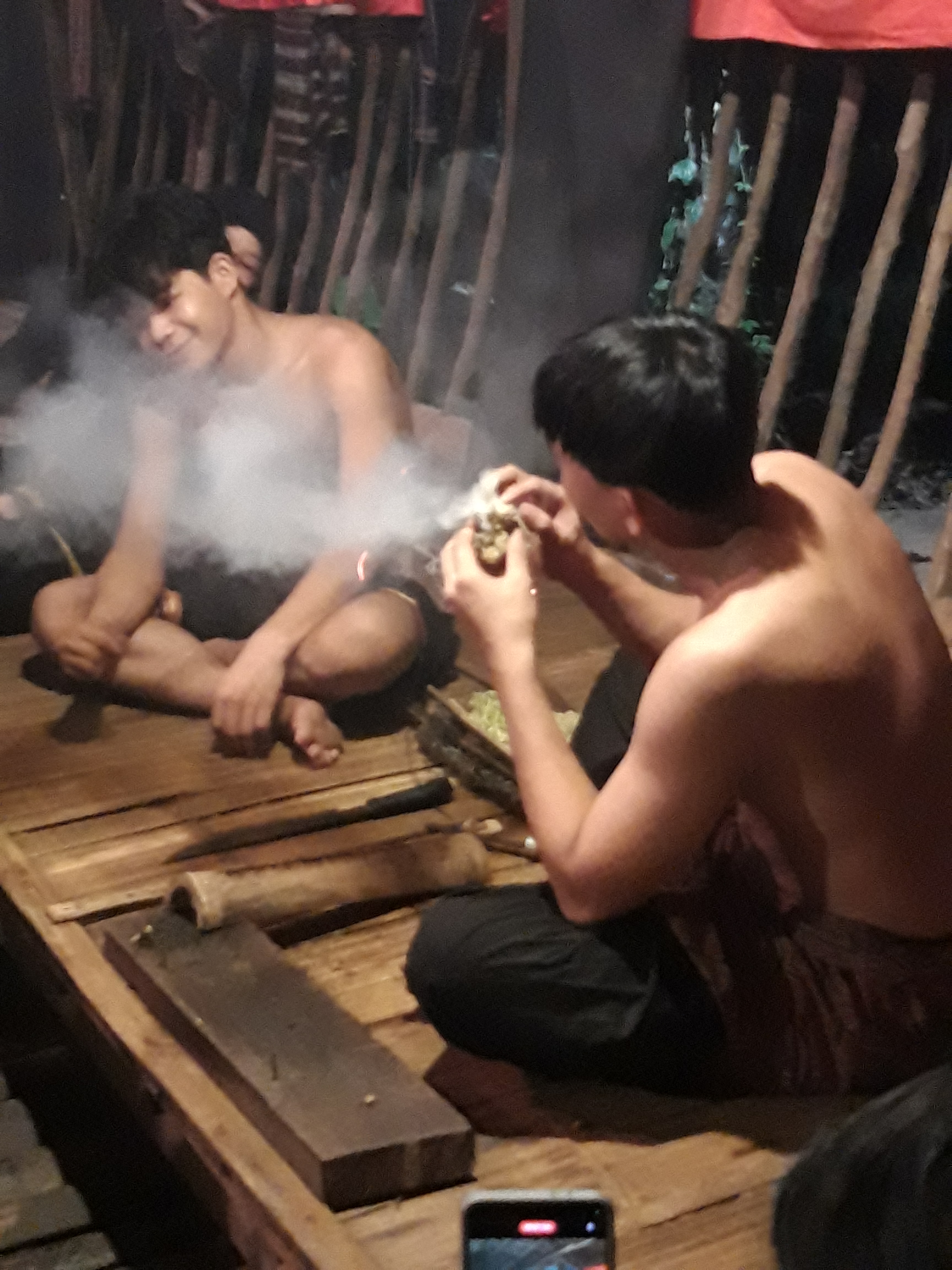
Demonstration of fire-starting in the Rungus house at the Mari Mari Cultural Village in Kota Kinabalu District

Magahau is the main and largest festival of the Rungus ethnic group, which is associated with the celebration of the new year according to the traditional calendar of Rungus. Like the Kadazan-Dusuns, Rungus people also celebrate Kaamatan, which became part of Magahau Rungus festival, with the festive, is one of the many festive entities during the month celebrated on 31 May every year. Even though there are many similarities in the way these festivities are celebrated between the two indigenous races, there are also differences between them. Among the original purposes of the Magahau festival are mamapak/mamasi palad/mangaraha palad (ceremonies related to sustenance), mintutun (introducing oneself), monudung (to find a partner), gimpuhut (the most beautiful girl), bunjal (barter system/selling activities), gontira (sports), posikib dot konsapatan sid keluarga om kinoruhangan (sharing sustenance with family and friends), mongodim dot kovorisan (inviting relatives), and humigak (partying).

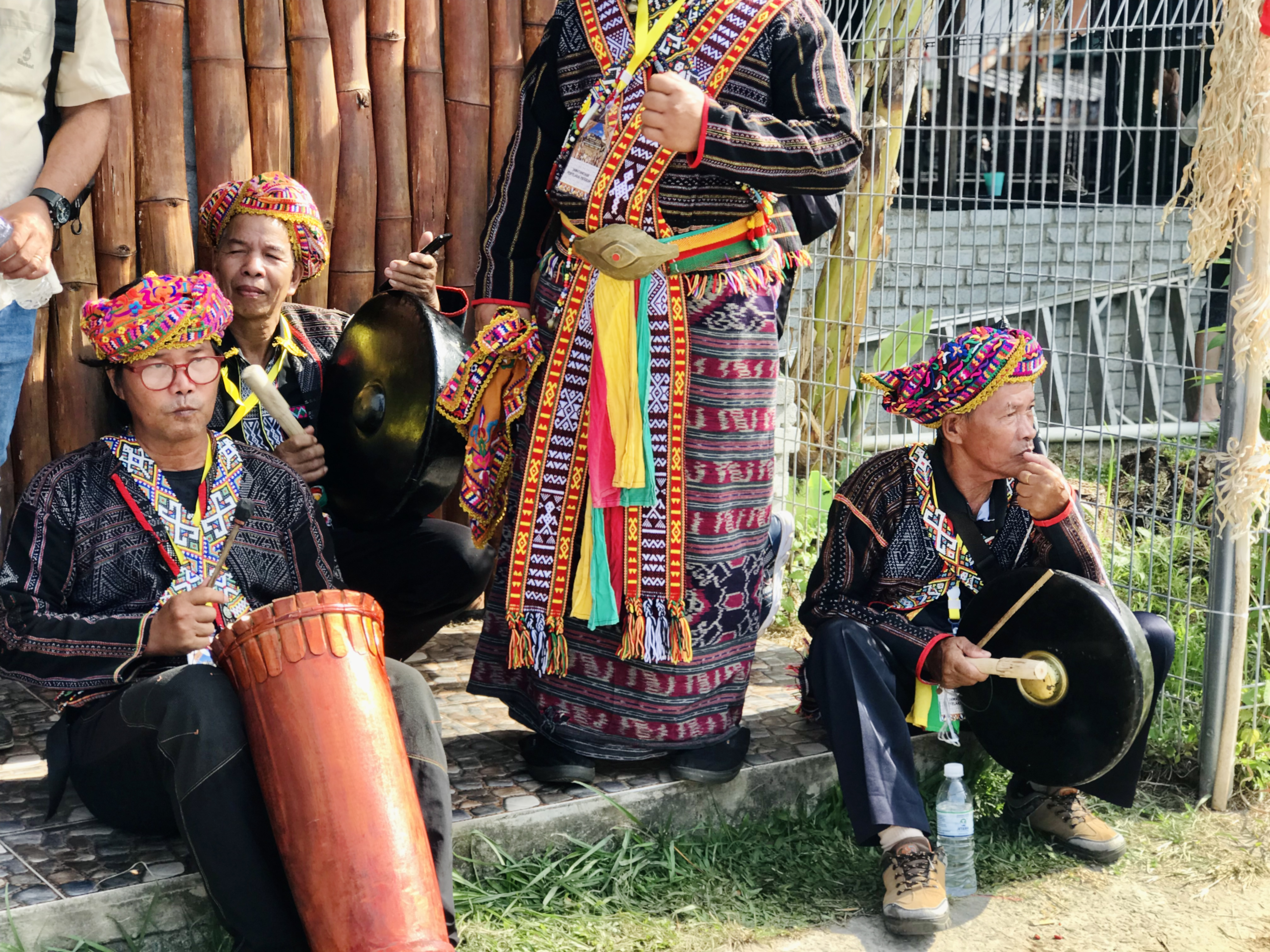
Rungus musician with their traditional instruments

The celebration during the festival includes mogunum (arrival of crowd), mangantag (traditional festive dance), mangatod (land clearing), mogontong (marriage), lumuvas (clearing away ritual ceremony), mongolosod (traditional ritual), mabbaris (an ethnic dance similar to Kadazan-Dusun sumazau), and manaradan (a sacred Rungus dance). Many of the original traditional practices of Magahau have shifted following the arrival of Christian missionaries in the 19th century throughout the administration of the North Borneo Chartered Company (NBCC). With the successful improvement of the economy, education, and health of the Rungus ethnic group in North Borneo by the British, many of the original Magahau ritual practices were abandoned since the practices contradicted the current religious teachings of the major religion of either Christianity or Islam, despite a majority of the ethnic group being well known for their traditional lifestyle.

=== Dress, traditional crafts and beadwork ===
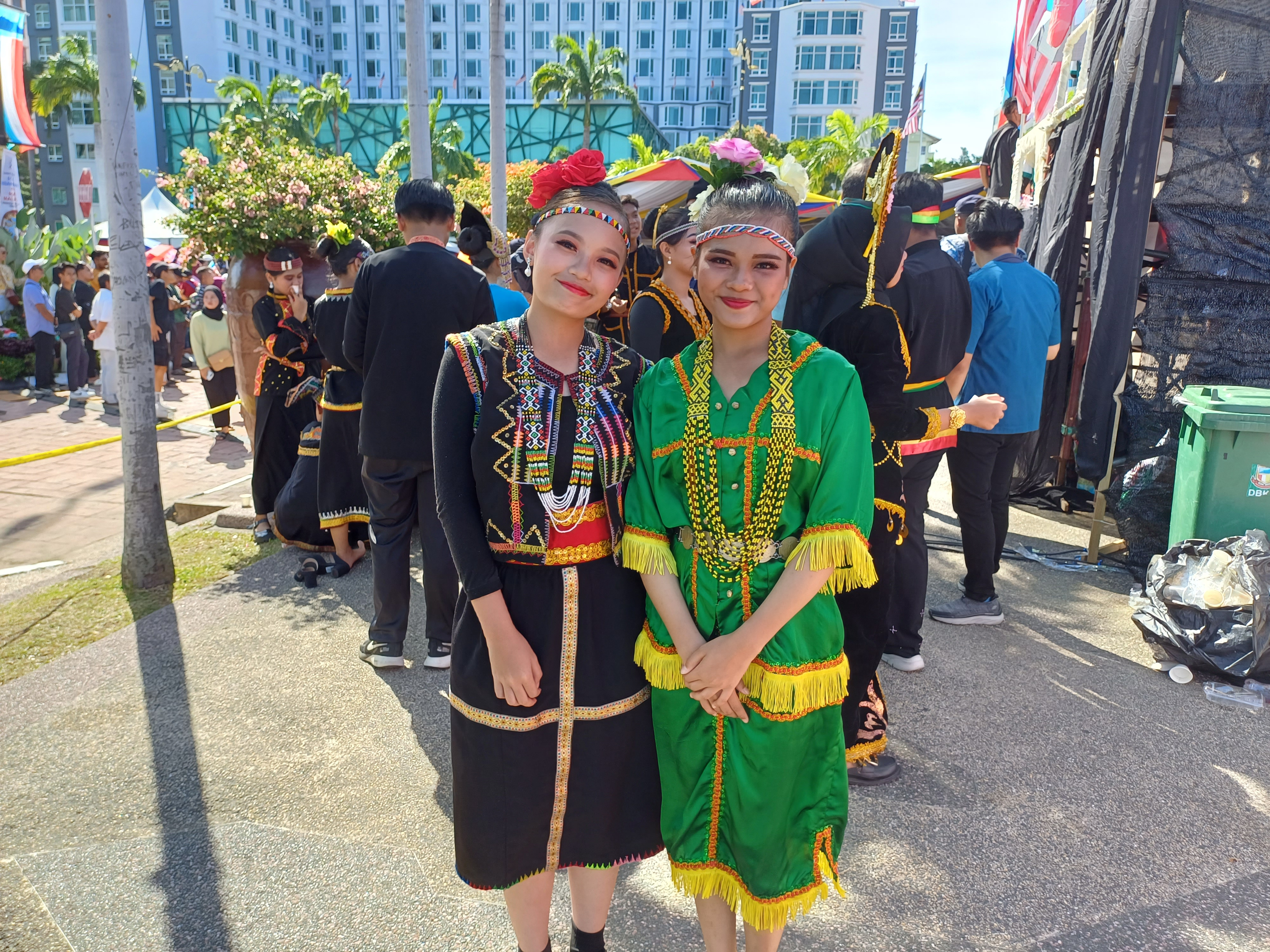
Rungus girls with pinakol beadwork

The traditional Rungus dress is black in colour, often with hundreds or even thousands of dollars' worth of antique beads. Traditionally all of the Rungus women wore heavy brass coils around their arms, legs and necks with their brass arm coils are often accompanied by white and coral shell bracelets. Rings of brass may also be worn around the waist. The beadwork and its designs easily distinguish the Rungus from the other indigenous ethnic groups of Sabah, where the beadwork's origin is often told through a story of a Rungus man going spear-hunting for a riverine creature. The pinakol consists of a pair of flat beaded bandoleer-type belts worn crossed over the chest and back.

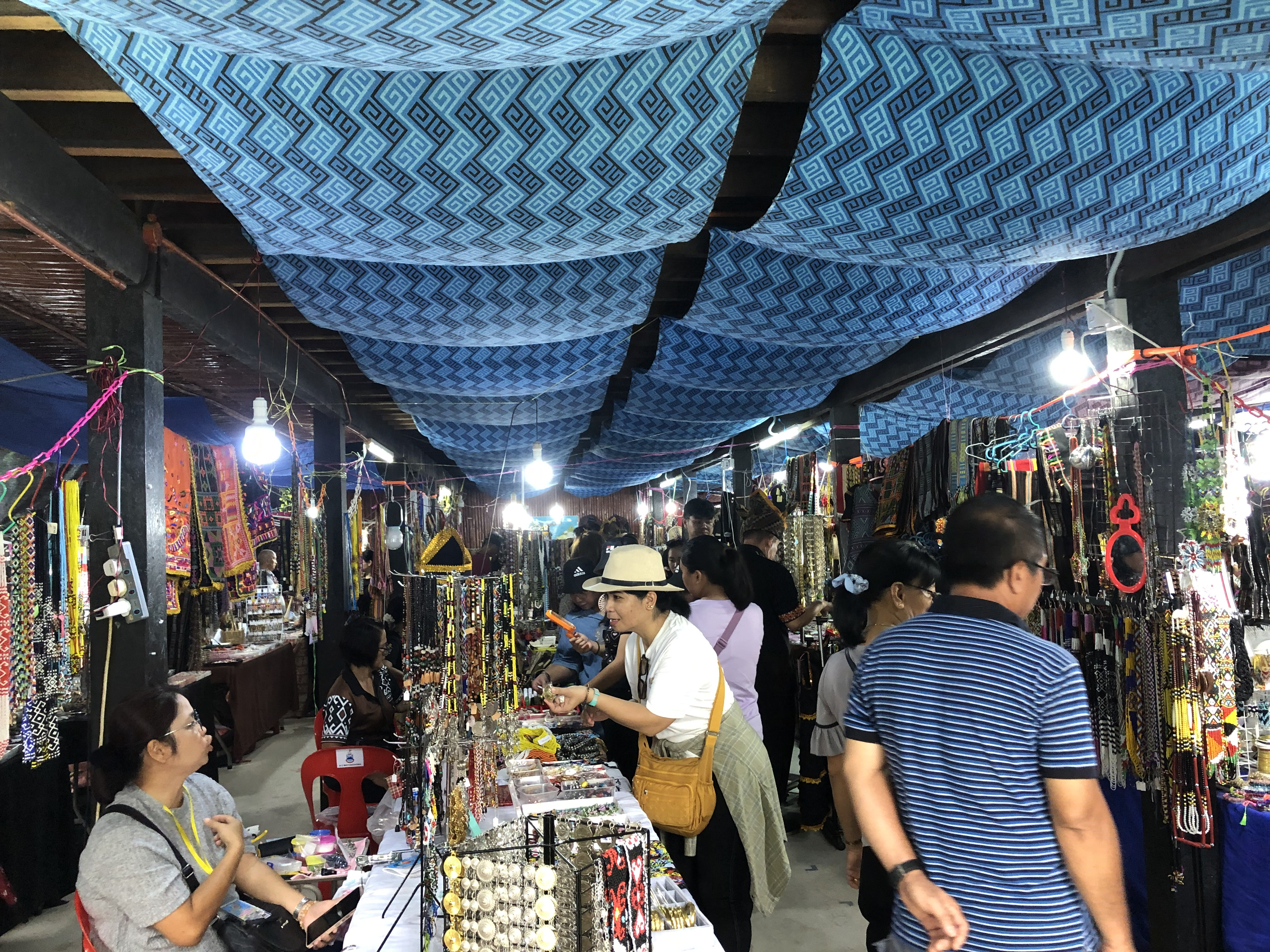
A Rungus craft market section during the Kaamatan

The sandang is a pair of long beaded strands, mostly with matching beads, which are worn crossed over the chest like the pinakol. The sulau is a flat beaded choker worn around the neck with two clamshell discs, one in front and one in back, with the small bells attached in the front. In the present day, the discs are made out of plastic. The tinggot is a short choker, either single-beaded or with narrow beadwork, which is worn by men. The togkul is a necklace some 26 inches (66 cm) long with beads similar to the sandang but smaller and worn around the neck. The sisingal is a narrow beaded band worn around the head.

The rampai is made of cotton, flowers, and beads worked into the hair. The orot, which is a little brass ring and antique bead looped through thin strands of stripped bark (togung), becomes a wide and colourful hipband. To wear this, it is slowly and carefully coiled around the hip, with the orot specially handmade by the Rungus men, as the technique is known only to them. A last string of beads called Llobokon is hung loosely from the coil. There are also sad'ang, earrings that sometimes have beads attached. Many of the beads used by the Rungus are plastic and glass imitations of older heirloom beads. Materials such as plastic spoons were heated over a flame, and the hot plastic was then wound onto a metal rod to make yellow beads.

=== Language and traditional writing ===
The main spoken language is the Rungus language, a branch of the Dusunic languages which is further subdivided into several dialects such as Gandahon (Kudat Division), Gonsomon (south of Kudat Harbour), Nuluw (northern tip of Kudat Peninsula), and Pilapazan (Central Rungus/Tanga Rungus) with both Gonsomon and Nuluw being among the most popular dialects spoken among the Rungus today. The ethnic also known for their antique traditional writing which is one of the forms of writing hieroglyphs or called surip in the indigenous Rungus language.

The use of the Rungus language among the native speakers faces a decline due to the emphasisation of the Malay language by the Malaysian federal government within national schools and the lack of support from the latter. The government of Sabah has initiated several policies to prevent the continuous decline, which is also happening to other groups of indigenous languages of Sabah. Among the steps that are being undertaken include the use of Rungus language in product advertising and public services, such as road signs. Other efforts were also made to include the Rungus language, such as the one being taken by the United Rungus Association of Sabah, which has designed various programmes, such as the establishment of Rungus language education schools with cultural arts training centres.

=== Religion ===
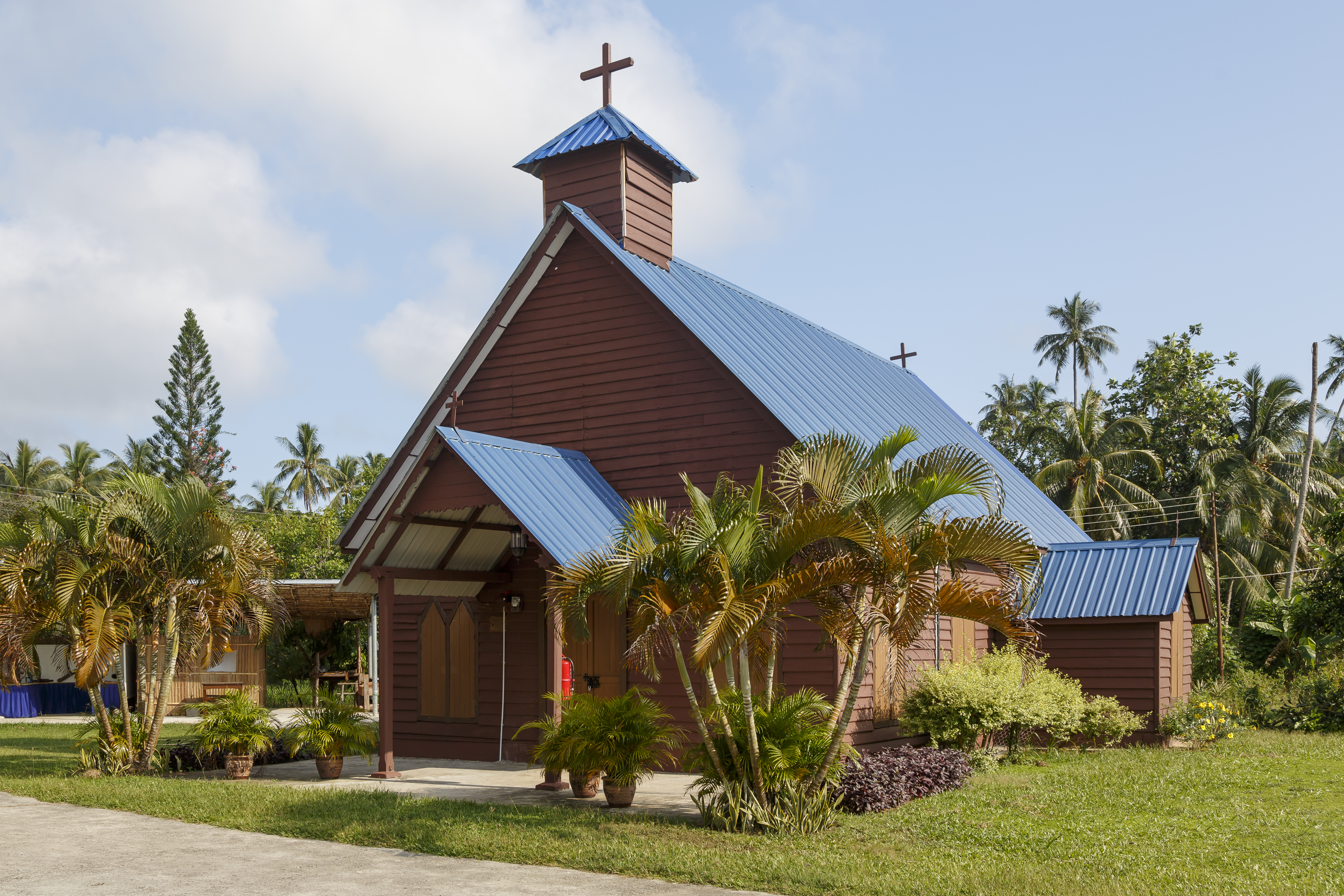
St Paul Sin San Church, an Anglican church within the coast of Rungus town

Traditionally, Rungus ethnic practiced an indigenous belief system known as labus, although some writers referring to it as a type of animism, with priests or shamans called rampahan and the highest female priestesses called bobolizan. The Rungus bobolizan is an intermediary connector with spirit worlds. Through their traditional beliefs, the Rungus are also known for their sacred grove, which served various functions in the preservation of biodiversity in their ancestral lands before it was reformed into a new form of land tenure following the introduction of Christianity. In the present days, most Rungus are now Christians belonging to the Protestant Church in Sabah (PCS) in the Lutheran tradition of Protestantism and although being an ethnic-based church, it consists mostly of Malaysian language-speaking congregations throughout Sabah as well as in West Malaysia with a mission church in the Federal Territory of Labuan, neighbouring Singapore and developed relationships with sister churches in Kalimantan of Indonesian Borneo. A smaller minorities of this tribe also adhere to other Christian denominations such as Roman Catholicism, Borneo Evangelical Church, Anglicanism, True Jesus Church and Seventh-day Adventism as well as a number of Muslim minority.

=== Traditional house ===
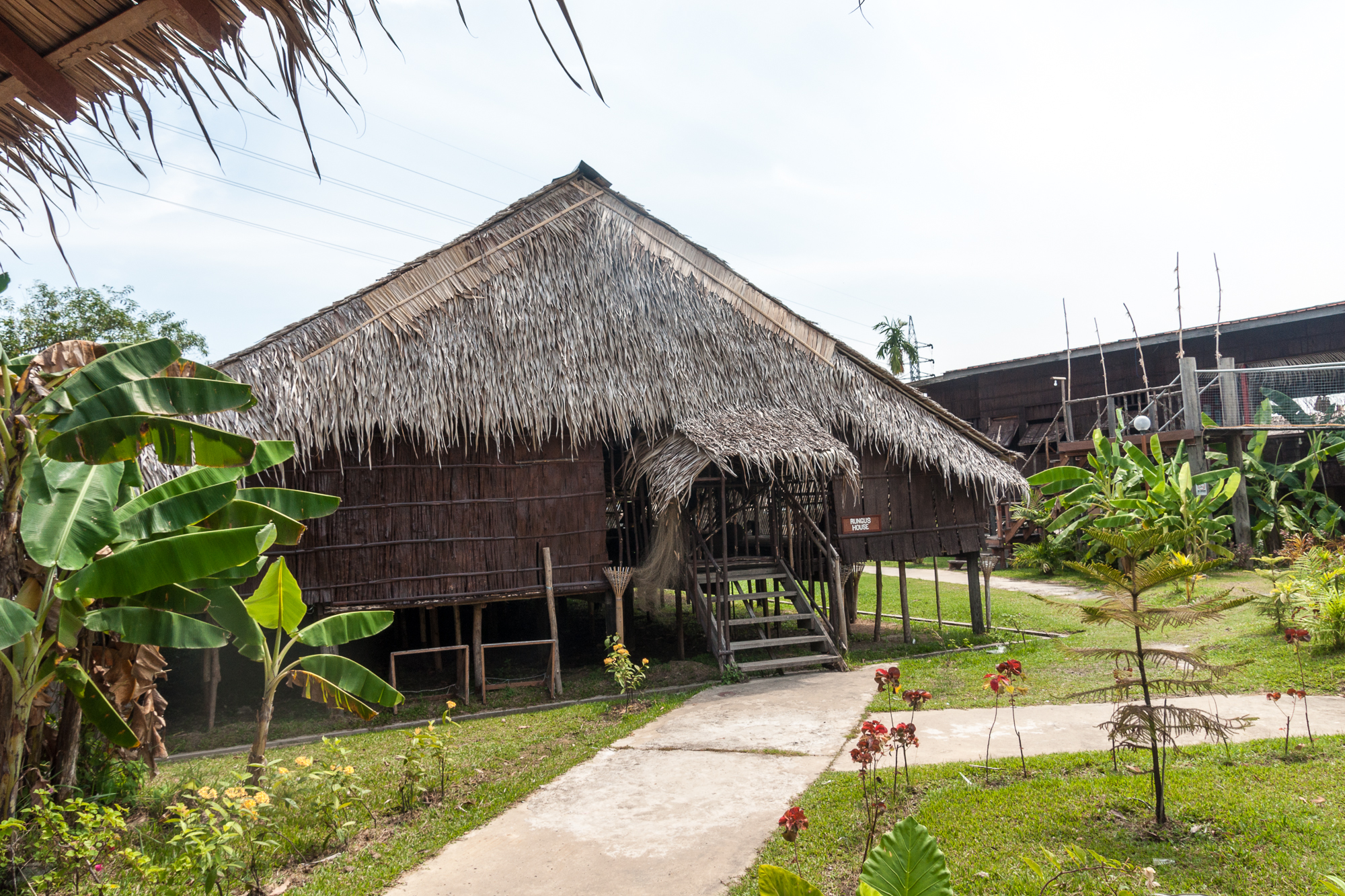
Rungus traditional house at the KDCA Compound

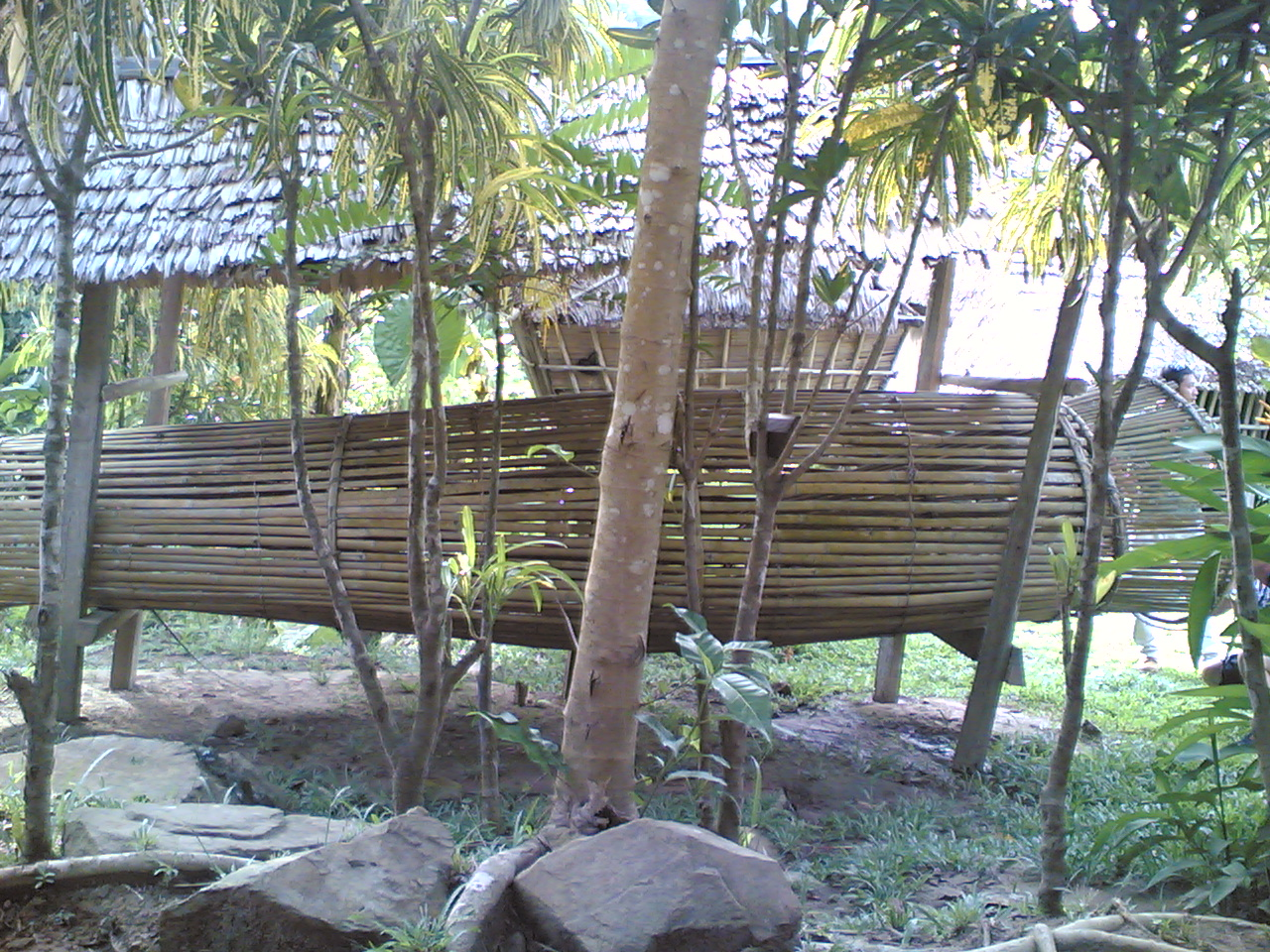
A large ceremonial bumbu ikan (fish trap) in a Rungus village in Kudat District of Borneo. A longhouse can be seen in the background, with distinct outward-sloped walls

Considered as one of the most traditional ethnic groups in Sabah, many ethnic Rungus once lived in longhouses, with each family having its own separate quarters off a common hall. At the edge of the communal hall, a well-ventilated platform of split bamboo with outward sloping walls provides a place for socialising and communal work where the longhouse is different from the types of Murut longhouse. The houses are not perched on high stilts, with only three to five feet above the ground. The longhouse roof is low, with the walls outward sloped. Among the older Rungus generation, longhouses of over 75 doors are common, while the current modern longhouse are rare to exceed 10 doors. Some modern two-story versions of the longhouse also exist, and single-family houses are sometimes built near the longhouse.

The Rungus traditional house of Bavanggazo in Matunggong features the traditional life of the Rungus community, constructed with locally sourced materials, such as rumbia (metroxylon sagu) leaves and bamboo stems. Built in 1992 with assistance from the Sabah Tourism Board, the house formed part of the Bavanggazo Cultural Village. Another villages in Matunggong, the Tinangol Village, is the location where the Rungus traditional handicraft centre was situated, and the Sumangkap Village is known as the gong-making centre.

== Notable people ==
- The late Mathius Majihi (1948–2021) – The first Rungus man who became Assistant Minister in Sabah and United Sabah Party (PBS) state assemblymqan for Matunggong from 1985–1994.
- The late Markus Majihi (1960–2018) – The former Rungus Assistant Minister in Sabah and PBS atate assemblyman for Matunggong from 1994–1999.
- Wetrom Bahanda – former Sabah state minister and Kota Marudu MP.
- Verdon Bahanda – Incumbent Kudat MP since 2022.
- Peter Rajah – Former state footballer from 1972 to 1994 (maternal ancestry through grandmother).
- Redonah Bahanda – First Rungus woman political secretary to the Chief Minister of Sabah in the modern era.
- Julita Majungki – Sabah Minister of Health since 2025 and PBS state assemblywoman for Matunggong since 2018.
