= Pinakol =

Traditional beadwork of Rungus in Sabah, Malaysia

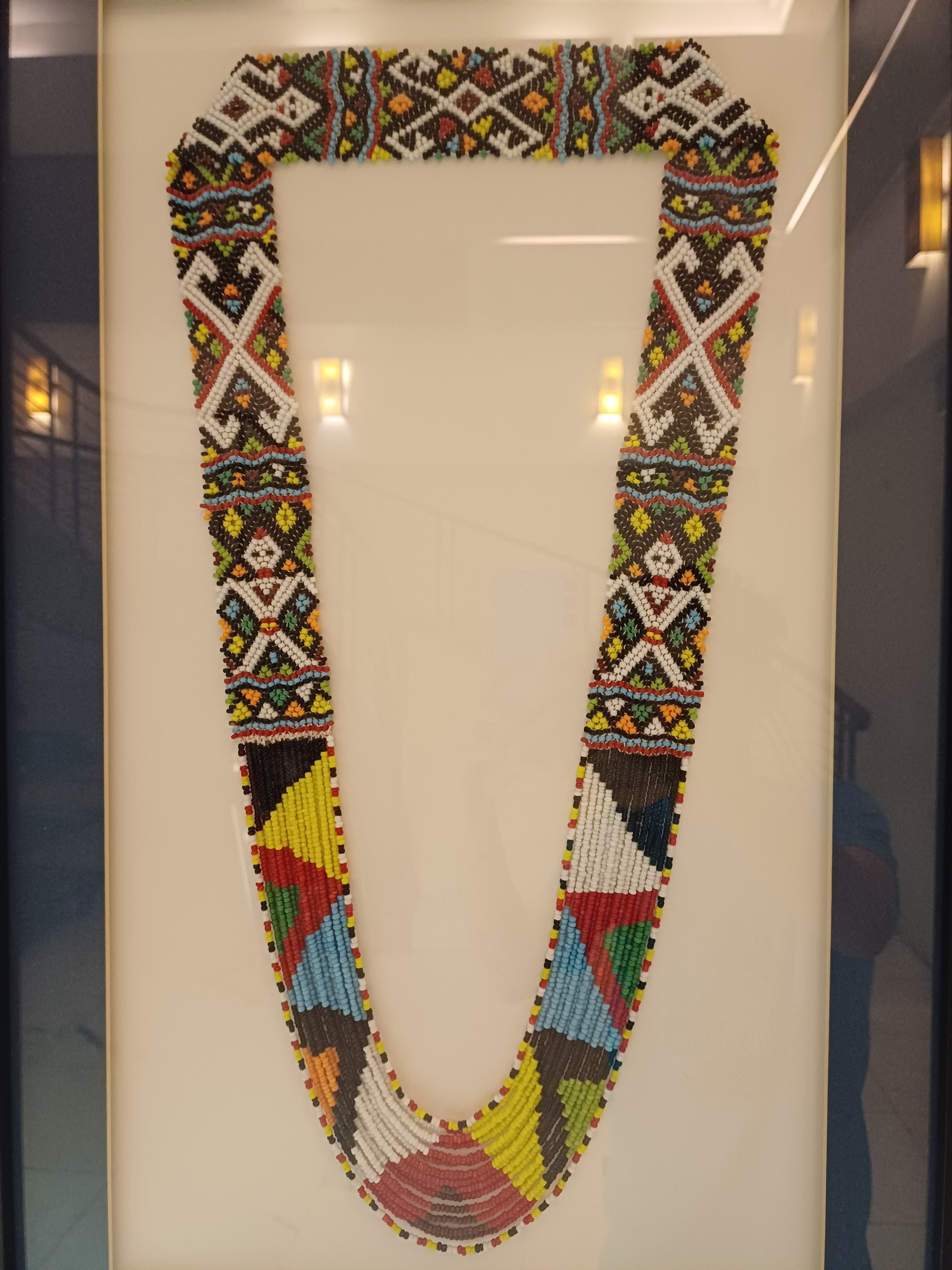
- Vinusak (flowered plant), one of the four motifs of pinakol
- Type: Beaded ornament
- Material: Seed beads
- Place of origin: Kudat District, Kudat Division, Sabah
- Manufacturer: Rungus people

Pinakol refers to the traditional beaded ornament created and occasionally worn by the Rungus female community of Kudat District, Kudat Division in northern Sabah of Malaysia during weddings and festive season of Magahau celebration. It is a shoulder bands worn diagonally across the chest, which are long and broad with multi-strands. The beadwork has become a cultural hereditary heritage among the Rungus community, especially on the female side, which was passed down to daughters through generations. The beadwork, colours used and designs used by the Rungus ethnic group can easily be distinguished from other ethnic groups in Sabah since it is often worn with the traditional Rungus clothing, which is usually black.

== Materials ==
Traditionally the seed beads used in the making of pinakol are limited since it is hard to retrieve. The beads are gathered through barter trade with Chinese and Brunei merchants as well as with the local natives. At the time, those with many beads are considered to be person with high status with wealth since the beads are hard to get. Due to this, pinakol are considered among the important accessories in the traditional clothing of the Rungus community, especially women, since it became the identity symbol of their ethnicity. The beads are also believed to carry the spirits of their ancestors and are passed down to female heirs, which are symbolised with beauty. In the period before the arrival of colonial powers in Borneo, pinakol is already part of the Rungus clothing. The process of making the accessories used to take a long time and consume a lot of energy to complete since it is need to be checked thoroughly.

== Pinakol folktales ==
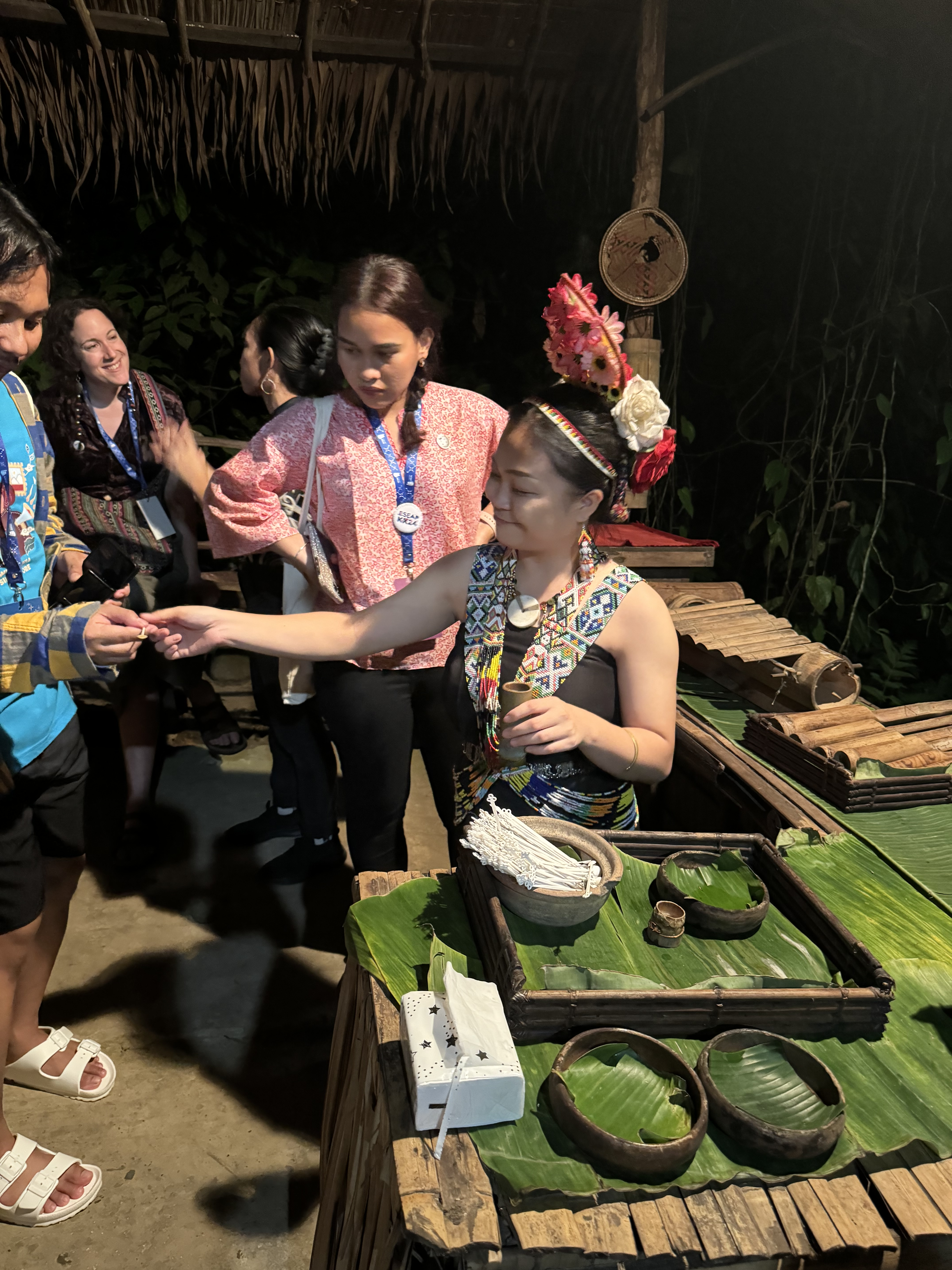
Rungus female with pinakol beadwork at the Mari Mari Cultural Village

Variation of folk stories are behind the creation of pinakol, with most contain elements of bravery, courage, love, and strength which are passed on as part of an oral tradition. One story tells about a Rungus warrior named Tiningulun who on a journey armed with a weapon named Inompuling in the deep forest of Borneo to look for a special vinusak, a type of flower, as a gift for his lover. During the walk, a very large poisonous mythical creature tinugarang (skink lizard) suddenly attacking where the warrior able to kill it and returns home safely with the item.

Another tells about a maiden waiting for the return of her lover from a long journey, who goes hunting and comes across a monstrous tinugarang lizard. Despite being injured, her lover eventually returns with the dead lizard where she attends to his injuries and places vinusak to cure the wounds. Both of the story is well known among the Rungus community, including to the larger Kadazan-Dusun ethnic groups with four pinakol motifs of tiningulun, tinugarang, tinompuling and vinusak are depicted in many of the traditional native arts and crafts of Sabah such as mats and bags.

The four motifs of Pinakol, from left: tiningulun, tinugarang, inompuling or tinompuling and vinusak.

== In the 20th and 21st century ==
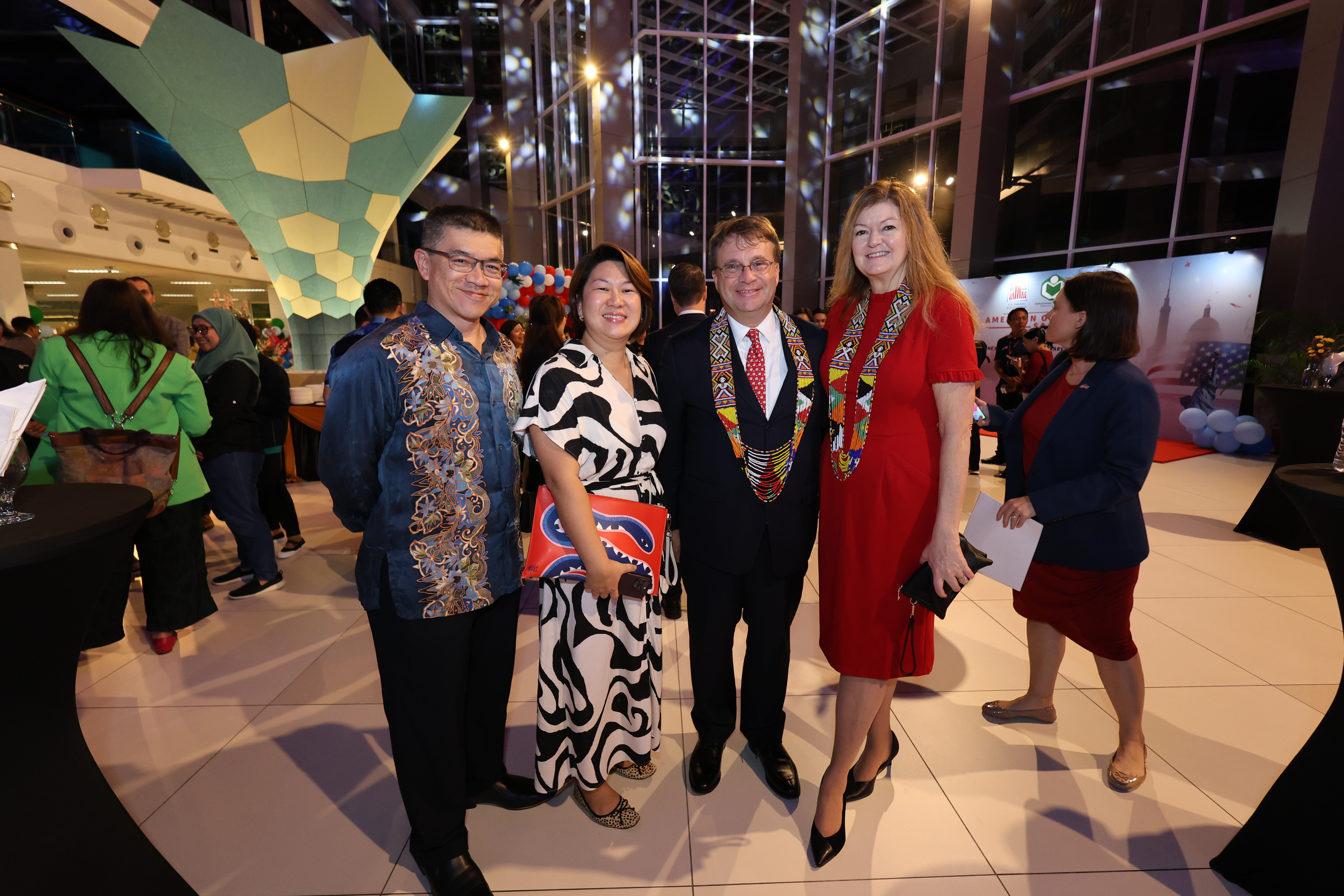
US ambassador Edgard Kagan and wife Cynthia "Cindy" Gire wearing pinakol beadwork during a visit to Sarawak and Sabah, 14 June 2024

Pinakol once featured in the sets of Malaysian stamps. During the royal visit by Duke of Cambridge Prince William and wife Catherine Middleton to Sabah in 2012, both of them were seen wearing dual-coloured beaded jewellery of pinakol after touching down at the Kota Kinabalu International Airport. The design of pinakol is among the submission design for the 25th anniversary of IKEA for the year of 2021 in Malaysia. During the preparation for the 2022 Asian Games, the Geely-PROTON took initiative by collecting Malaysia's cultural crafts to be contributed to the Asian Games Museum in Hangzhou, China. Among the collected crafts are the Rungus beaded pinakol necklace. During the visit by the US ambassador Edgard Kagan and his wife to Sarawak and Sabah on 14 June 2024, both were seen wearing the pinakol beadwork.

== See also ==
- List of Intangible Cultural Heritage elements in Malaysia
