= Nunuk Ragang =

Location of the original home of the ancestors of the Kadazan-Dusun

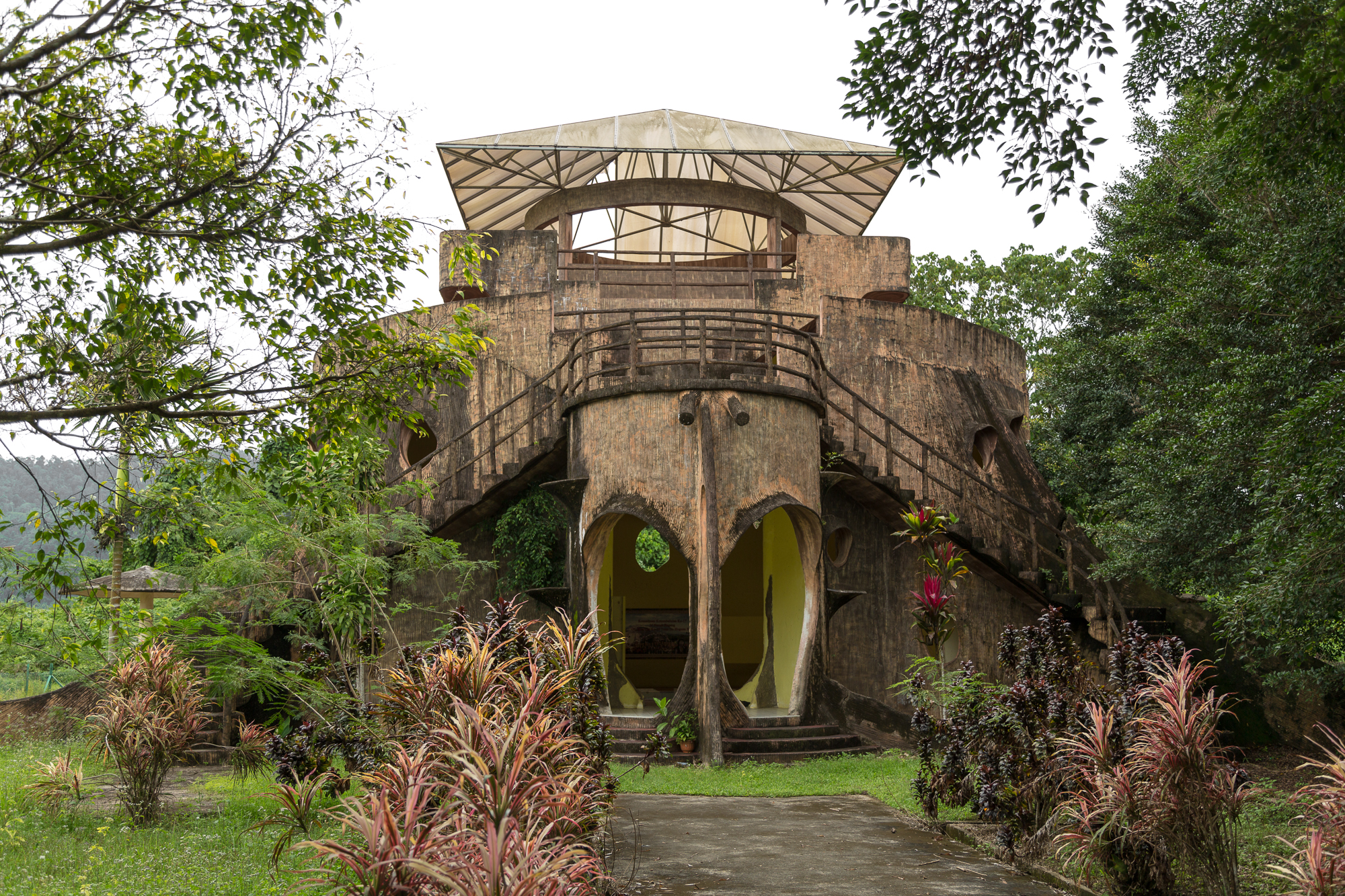
- Nunuk Ragang monument entrance
- Interactive map of Nunuk Ragang
- Location: Ranau District, West Coast Division
- Coordinates: 5°42′50.409″N 116°51′18.561″E
- Opening date: 2004
- Dedicated to: The location of the original home of the ancestors of the Kadazan, Dusun, and Rungus natives who inhabit most of northern Borneo in Sabah, Malaysia

Nunuk Ragang is a site traditionally considered as the location of the original home of the ancestors of the Kadazan, Dusun, and Rungus natives who inhabit most of northern Borneo in Sabah, Malaysia. The site, nearby a village named Tompios, is located at the intersection of the left (Liwagu Kogibangan) and right (Liwagu Kowananan) branches of the Liwagu River to the east of Ranau and Tambunan districts where various Dusun sub-groups of Liwan Dusun, Tinagas Dusun, Bundu Dusun, Talantang Dusun, Tagahas Dusun, Orang Sungei and Tambanuo are living.

The two river branches joined up to flow into the Labuk River and drain out into the Sulu Sea. At the site, and under a giant banyan tree, a settlement referred to as Nunuk Ragang was founded where the giant tree was said to be able to give shade to a longhouse sheltering 10 families in it. According to the stories of the elders of the Kadazan-Dusun tribe, the tree was six fathoms in size and its lush leaves could shelter seven Kadazan huts measuring 240 square feet. The legend about Nunuk Ragang had been passed down via oral traditions to the younger generations despite there is still no archaeological excavation ever been carried out to establish the veracity of the legend.

In 2004, the quasi-government group of the Kadazan-Dusun Cultural Association (KDCA) set up a monument near Tompios (Tampias) at the site of what they believed to be the original village. The word tampias means "sprinkled" or "dispersed". The monument was built in the form of a huge fig tree. The association conducts annual pilgrimages to the site, timed to coincide with the inauguration of its paramount chief, the "Huguon Siou".

== Etymology ==
The name Nunuk Ragang is derived from two Kadazan-Dusun words "nunuk" which refers to the banyan tree and "ragang" which could mean "newborn baby" or is a shortened form of the word "aragang" which means "red coloured". The two words together therefore possibly refer to either a "newborn baby banyan tree" or a "red coloured banyan tree". Botanically, species has been identified as Ficus racemosa due to the large bright red ripe fruit of this type of banyan tree. The Kadazan-Dusun has a fondness for riddling, giving names to places, things and actions in terms other than the actual.

== Religious and cultural life ==
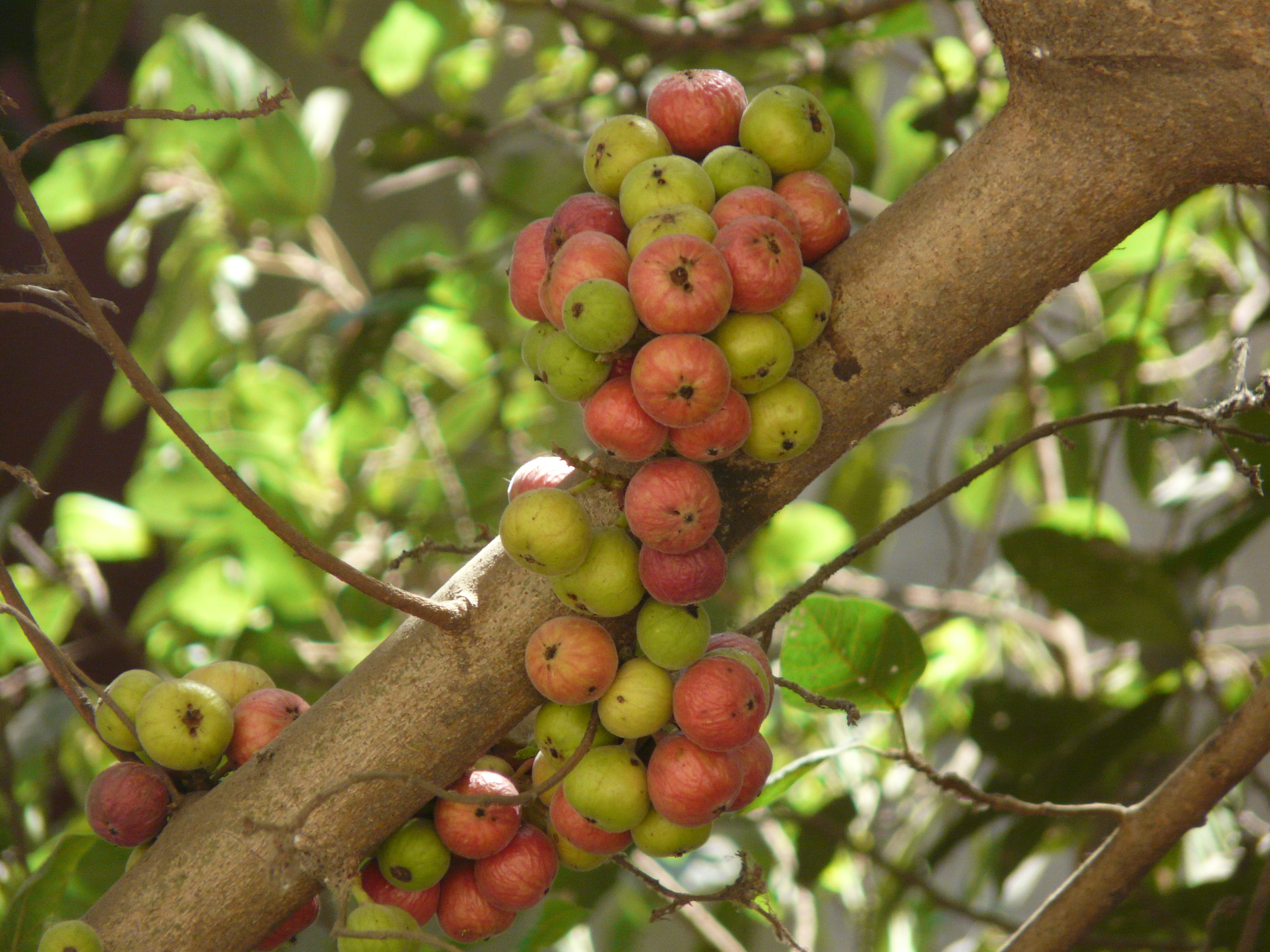
The banyan species, Ficus racemosa, is named Nunuk Ragang because of its red fruit

The Nunuk Ragang settlement has been existent for 328 years, from 1415 to 1743. At the settlement began the belief system and culture of the Kadazan, Dusun, and Rungus. There was no word for "religion" among the ancient Kadazan-Dusun and to them it was just a sort of relationship between the seen and the unseen. Some people would equate this to Animism. This belief system centres largely on their livelihood and rituals so as to maintain the balance, order and harmony between themselves and between them and their environment, which consequently provide conditions for bountiful cultivation and harvests and continued existence of the race. At the settlement also began Momolianism of the Kadazan and Dusun together with the Rungus Labus system, a philosophical system, which when coupled with the belief system, had guided the life of the three indigenous tribes up to the present age. Surrounded by thick primary forest teeming in wildlife, nature and nurture became the foundation for the birth and growth of the belief system and cultural heritage of the Kadazan-Dusun and Rungus.

== Food and material needs ==
The Dusunic-speaking peoples, descendants of the pioneers at Nunuk Ragang, are today agriculturalists and paddy planting is the common occupation among them. But according to oral traditions passed down from elders, the Nunuk Ragang people were practising vegeculture. Vegeculture is the cultivation and propagation of plant food by utilising the suckers of plants such as the yam, the sweet potato and cassava, eliminating the needs for seeds and permanent storage thus facilitating rapid migrations. Bamboo, palm trees and rattan were the primary materials used for all forms of activities connected to home construction and storage. To light a fire the settlers used dried cottony bark scraped from the Polod palm tree. Metal, used for making dangol (short machete) and pais (carving knives) was already available, most probably through barter trading with coastal peoples. The Nunuk Ragang settlers also adapted to their environment by becoming hunter-gatherers and trappers. Salt, an important food enhancer and preservative was only intermittently available from the distant coastal region, prompting the Nunuk Ragang settlers to search out for sosopon (natural salt lick) frequented by wild animals. This persistent shortage of salt also gave rise to two important techniques, "memangi" and "manalau", for the preservation of meat and fish. Memangi produces "pinongian" or "bosou" (meat or fish preserved using the fleshy kernels from seeds of the Pangium edule tree), and manalau, a smoked meat called "sinalau".

== Leadership and social hierarchy ==
The Huguan Siou leadership, a unique position to defend the culture, rights, identity and dignity of the Kadazan-Dusun was non existent at Nunuk Ragang. This leadership position, which had its roots at Guunsing (also spelled Gunsing), Penampang was only institutionalised after the formation of Malaysia in 1963. Although the Nunuk Ragang society was egalitarian, at times of challenge or crisis they were led by warriors, who in turn were guided by the words of bobohizan (also referred as bobolians), as revealed by divine revelation from spirits. These bobolians were mostly women who play their role as priestesses with female play an important function in the early Nunuk Ragang society.

== Exodus and dispersal ==
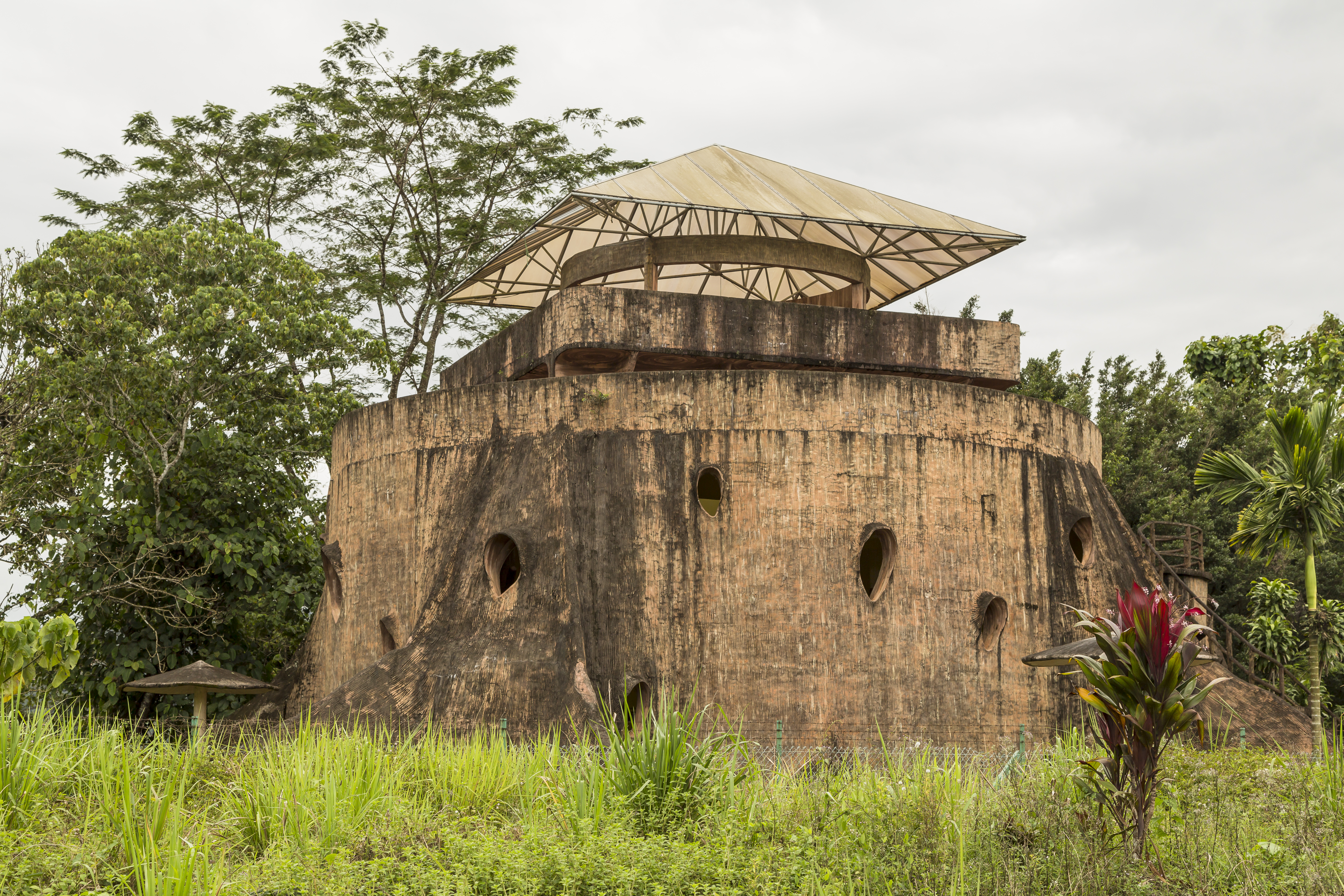
Nunuk Ragang monument seen from a distance

After a number of years, a major crisis, called the "Minorit Push", caused the Kadazan-Dusun and Rungus to completely moved out of the site. The driving force behind the movement out and dispersal of the Kadazan-Dusun and Rungus from Nunuk Ragang was said to be the "Minorits", legendary tiny spiritual beings, emerging out of the ground to enforce their practice of infanticide. This exodus and dispersal led to the peopling of each territory in North Borneo. Each territory peopled had its own particular attraction or pull for peopling such as for example the "Minkokook Pull" for the Tambunan Plain and the "Gomala Pull" for the Kundasang/Bundu Tuhan Highland. It is not known why the ancestors were unable to fend off the minorits, but in light of the Kadazan-Dusun love of the practice of riddling, and couching of taboo terms in alternative words and phrases, the legend of the Minorits is most likely a composite narratives of several natural phenomena and man-made activities, which evolved over time into this reason for moving out of Nunuk Ragang. The most likely candidates are the smallpox and collapse of the soil fertility resulting from the advent of invasive lalang grasses. In this connection, the word "minorit" merit explanation. According to research conducted by Ivor Hugh Norman Evans, the word minorit is used by Dusun in two phrases i.e. "minorit O' paka" referring to the vast sea of lalang (imperata cylindrica) invasively growing at newly cleared forest, as visible in Tempasuk and Matunggong.

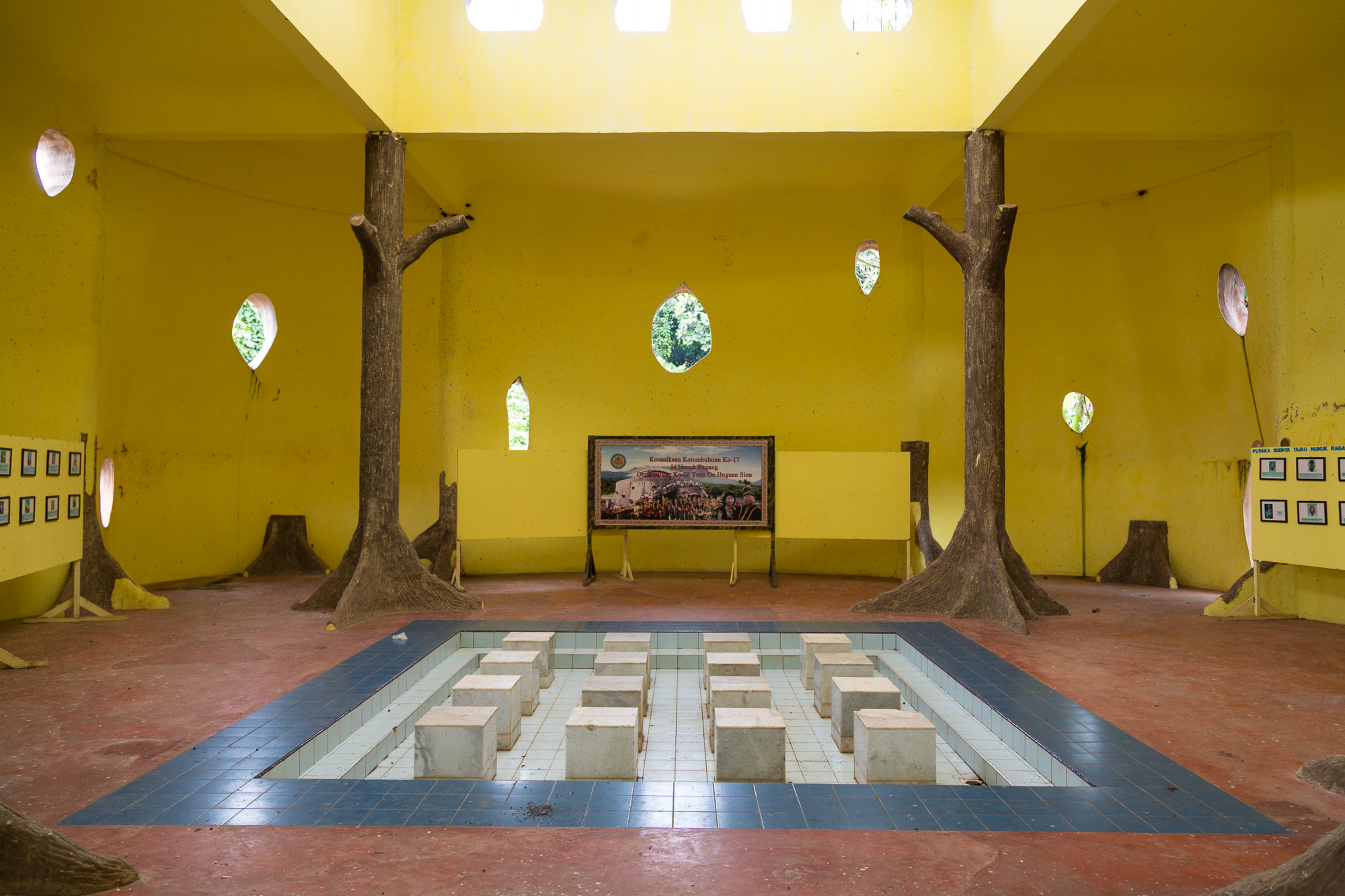
The interior of the Nunuk Ragang monument

Another use of the word is in the phrase "minorit O' lasu" referring to skin disease with spots of the same size spread all over the body. The Minorit push can therefore be attributed to either the degradation of the land at Nunuk Ragang due to fertility loss as the grass species, lalang grass invades the land after forest clearing or the advent of smallpox epidemic among the people. The Smallpox pandemic which began in the 16th century in Europe, which was common. The population at Nunuk Ragang in that year was just about hundred individuals. The Kadazan-Dusun race would not have emerged to become a people if the ancestors had not moved out and dispersed. The people of Nunuk Ragang never had the opportunity to avail of the practice of variolation (also known as inoculation) even though this method of prevention of the smallpox was first invented in the Ming dynasty of China around 1500. Nunuk Ragang, an ideal site at the confluence of the Liwagu Kogibangan and Liwagu Kawanan and draining out into the Sulu Sea via the Labuk River had most of the ingredients for the emergence of a Kadazan-Dusun River Civilisation. Unfortunately the dispersal of the Kadazan-Dusun contributed towards the failure of the race to rise above culture to achieve the status of a civilisation. The word Liwagu derives from the Kadazan-Dusun phrase "muli wagu" meaning "return home again". The male ancestors was never able to return to their homeland. Cut off from their heritage, the descendants made the best use of the environment to which they were born into, thus giving birth to the unique Kadazan-Dusun culture. Present day Kadazan-Dusun leaders suggest that representatives of each sub-ethnic tribes under the Kadazan-Dusun race conduct an annual "muli wagu" (homecoming) to 'Nunuk Ragang as added tourism product to develop their common home.

=== Minorit as a metaphor ===
The term Minorit is a metaphor of the monoculturalism emergence in the Kadazan-Dusun community, the deterioration of natural resources in Nunuk Ragang, and the extreme population there. It is related to the religion of the Kadazan-Dusun ancestors who at that time practised animism and worshipped Kinorohingan as God and Huminodun as in Bambarayon (the spirit of food sources and their saviour). After rice cultivation was introduced in the Kadazan-Dusun community, Bambarayon was associated with rice spirits. In the future, anywhere the Kadazan-Dusuns would make new settlements, monoculturalism and harvesting festival have become parts of their culture.

The minorit push is indeed a metaphorical depiction of social crisis in Nunuk Ragang because it refers to a kind of unspecified creature which does not exist today. However, it became a revolution which forced the community to initiate a massive evacuation of Nunuk Ragang.

== See also ==
- Dusun people
