= Bengkoka Peninsula =

Peninsula in Sabah, Malaysia

- Location of Bengkoka Peninsula in Sabah
- Location of Bengkoka Peninsula in Malaysia
- Etymology: Semenanjung Bengkoka

Geography
- Location: Kudat Division
- Coordinates: 6°55′28.889″N 117°8′44.115″E
- Archipelago: Maritime Southeast Asia
- Adjacent to: South China Sea; Sulu Sea

Administration
- Malaysia
- State: Sabah

The Bengkoka Peninsula (Malay: Semenanjung Bengkoka) is a peninsula in northern of Sabah, Malaysia. It consists of coastal with swampy areas. The peninsula become the area where the South China Sea meets the Sulu Sea.

== Geology ==
The peninsula is formed since the Oligocene with various materials such as sandstone, mudstone, siltstone, shale, conglomerate, lignite with minor limestone and tuff.

== Climate and biodiversity ==
The peninsula area generally received mean annual rainfall ranging from 2,000 millimetres to 2,500 millimetres. In the peninsula located the Tambalugu Forest Reserve where several mammals including barking deer and wild boar are found in the area. Together with Kudat Peninsula, it is part of the Tun Mustapha Marine Park which includes coral reefs conservation. The peninsula is also known for its mosquito fauna with about 37 species of mosquitoes from seven genera were found in six villages in the area.
