= Kudat Peninsula =

Peninsula in northern Malaysia

- Location of Kudat Peninsula in Sabah
- Location of Kudat Peninsula in Malaysia
- Etymology: Semenanjung Kudat

Geography
- Location: Kudat Division
- Coordinates: 6°56′8.642″N 116°45′42.309″E
- Archipelago: Maritime Southeast Asia
- Adjacent to: South China Sea; Sulu Sea

Administration
- Malaysia
- State: Sabah

The Kudat Peninsula (Malay: Semenanjung Kudat) is a peninsula in northern of Sabah, Malaysia. It consists of high coastal with windy shorelines and swamp areas. The peninsula become the area where the South China Sea meets the Sulu Sea.

== Geology ==
Kudat formation is originated from deep marine environment. The peninsula is geologically high flanked by deep structural depressions with the northern terrane comprises thick-bedded sandstone with interbeds of silty mudstone and contains calcareous nannofossil of Early Eocene to Middle Eocene that were deposited in deep-water setting in contrast to shallow-marine environments declared in previously published material. In the central area of the peninsula in Sikuati located an oil seep in a tidal mangrove swamp surrounded by an adjacent green area of primary and secondary vegetation.

== Climate and biodiversity ==
The peninsula generally received mean annual rainfall ranging from 2,000 millimetres to 2,500 millimetres while part in the southern received rainfall between 2,500 millimetres to 3,000 millimetres. Together with Bengkoka Peninsula, it is part of the Tun Mustapha Marine Park which includes coral reefs conservation.
