= Mari Mari Cultural Village =

Open-air museum in Sabah, Malaysia

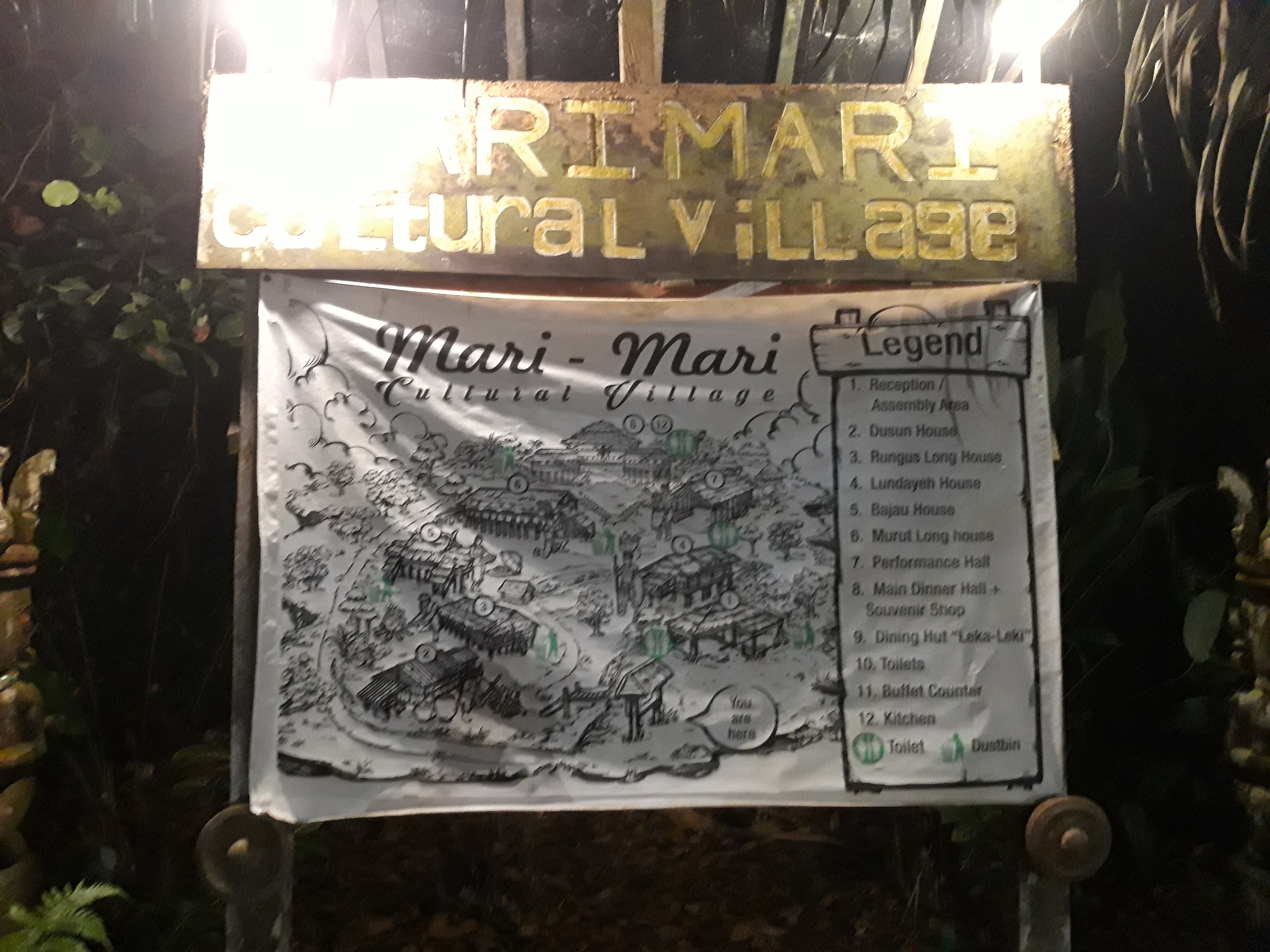
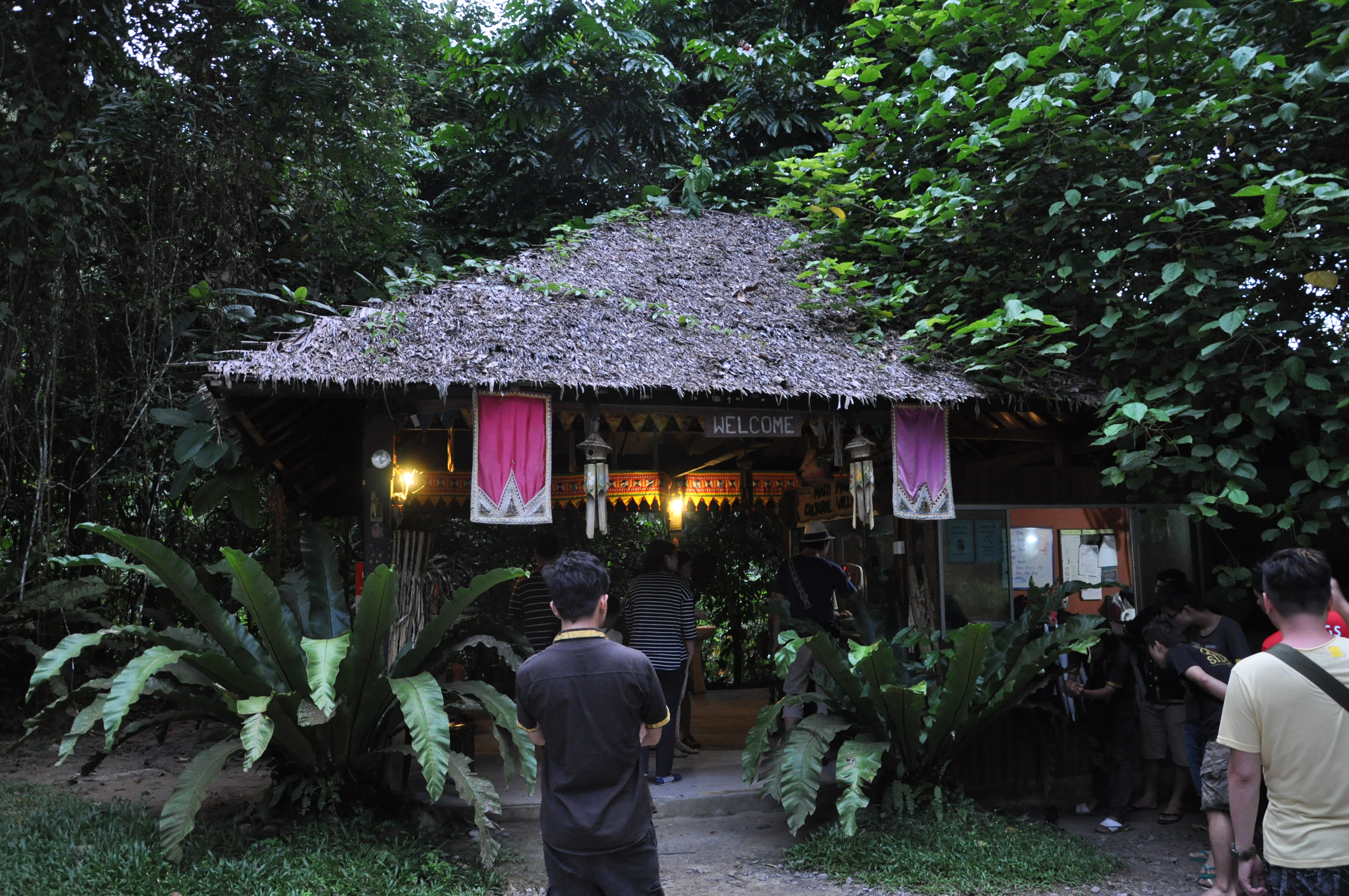
- (Top) The cultural village map of direction (Bottom) The entrance
- Established: 1996
- Location: Kionsom Road, Inanam, 88450 Kota Kinabalu District, Sabah
- Coordinates: 5°58′25.99″N 116°12′13.175″E
- Type: Open-air, cultural history, living history museum
- Website: marimariculturalvillage.my

The Mari Mari Cultural Village (Kadazan Dusun: Kampung Koubasanan Mari Mari; Malay: Kampung Budaya Mari Mari) is an open-air museum which is dedicated to preserving the traditions, culture, and history of northern Borneo's indigenous communities in Sabah, Malaysia. The cultural village features the five main Sabah's indigenous such as the Kadazan-Dusun people, the Muruts, the Rungus, the Lundayeh, and the Bajaus.

== History and background ==
The cultural village was established in 1996 to preserve the indigenous ethnic culture of northern Borneo. The founders of the cultural village decided on its foundation as a cultural history landmark in the world of rapidly modernising generations that contributes to the disappearance of indigenous cultures by recognising the need to maintain the heritage of the five main tribes in Sabah, providing insights and interactive education for both locals and tourists.

== Features ==
It features the traditional ways of life of Sabah's five main indigenous groups through each of their traditional houses, such as blowpipe making, fire-starting, and tattooing, providing insights into mystical beliefs among the different ethnic groups. The cultural village is divided into five ethnic villages. At the Bajau village, it features the tradition of the ethnic group who had migrated from the Philippines for 500 years. Skulls are featured at the Kadazan-Dusun and Murut villages, symbolising the headhunting period of both ethnicities for 100 years. The Lundayeh village features the process of tree bark clothing making. In the Murut village, visitors can also participate in dance activities above the central floor of the house with flexible logs that will result in a trampoline effect when they jump to reach for a prize. In the Rungus village, various traditional crafts are featured. Various traditional dishes prepared by the indigenous are also being featured in the cultural village.

== Gallery ==
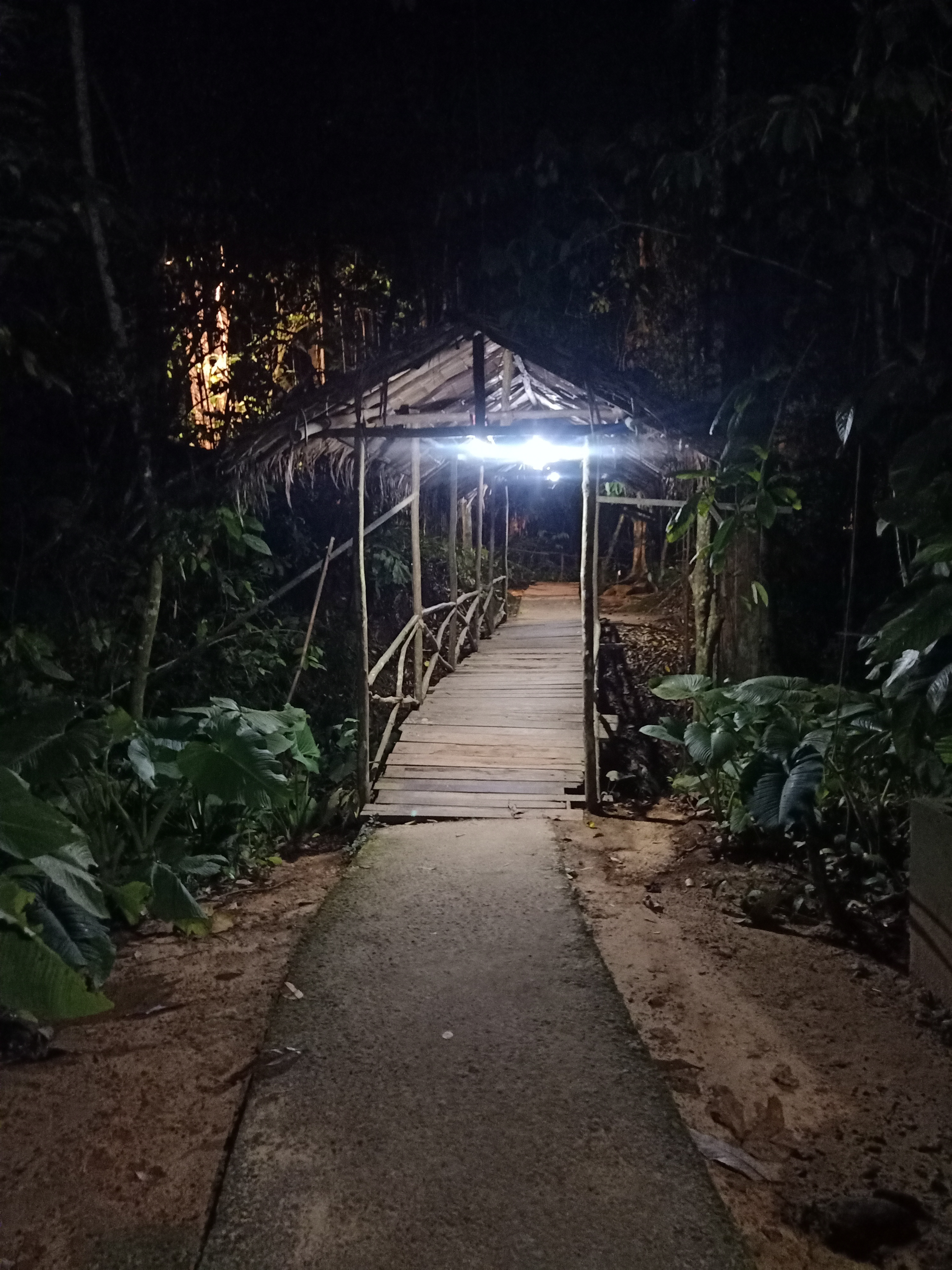
A walkthrough to the cultural village

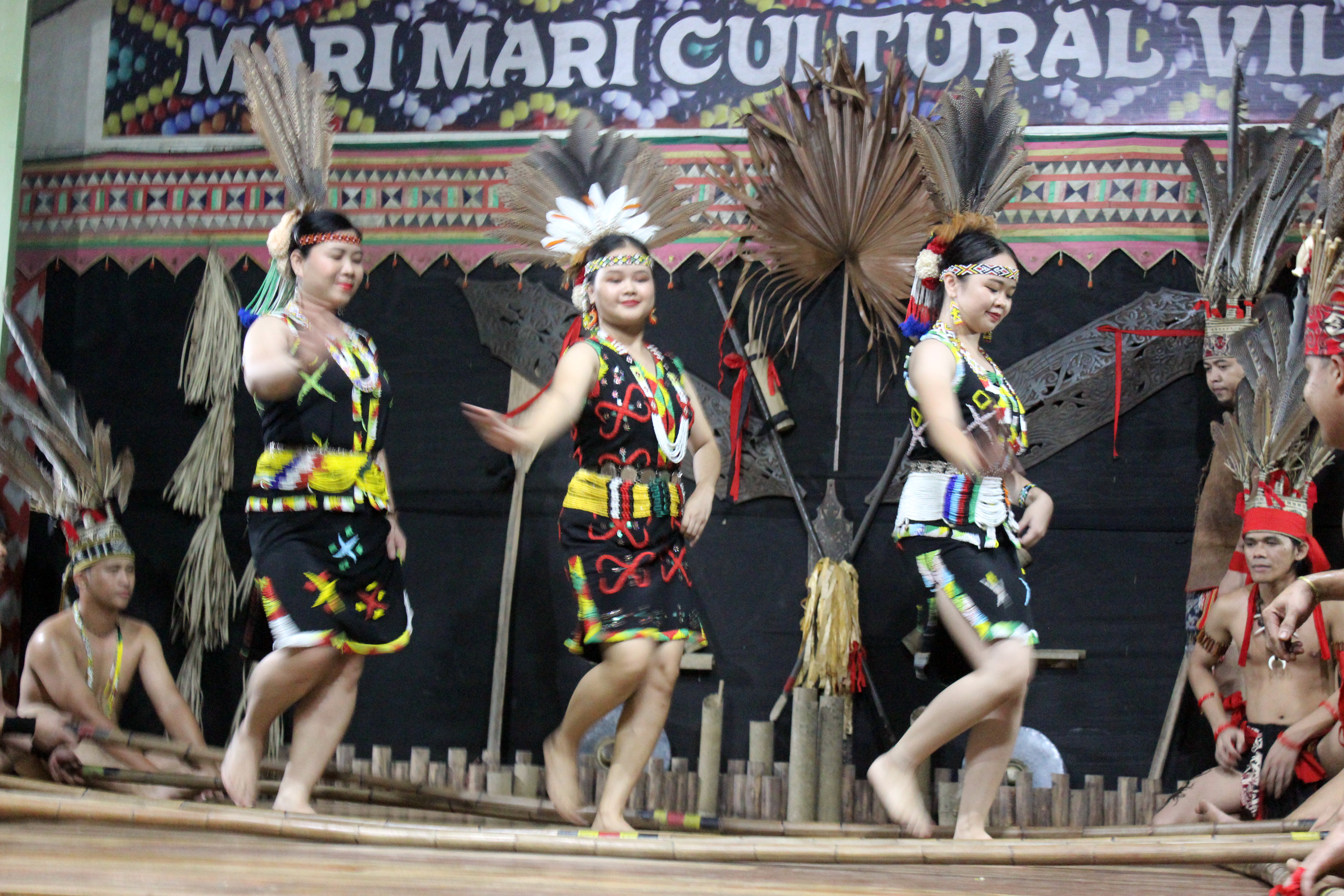
Dance performances

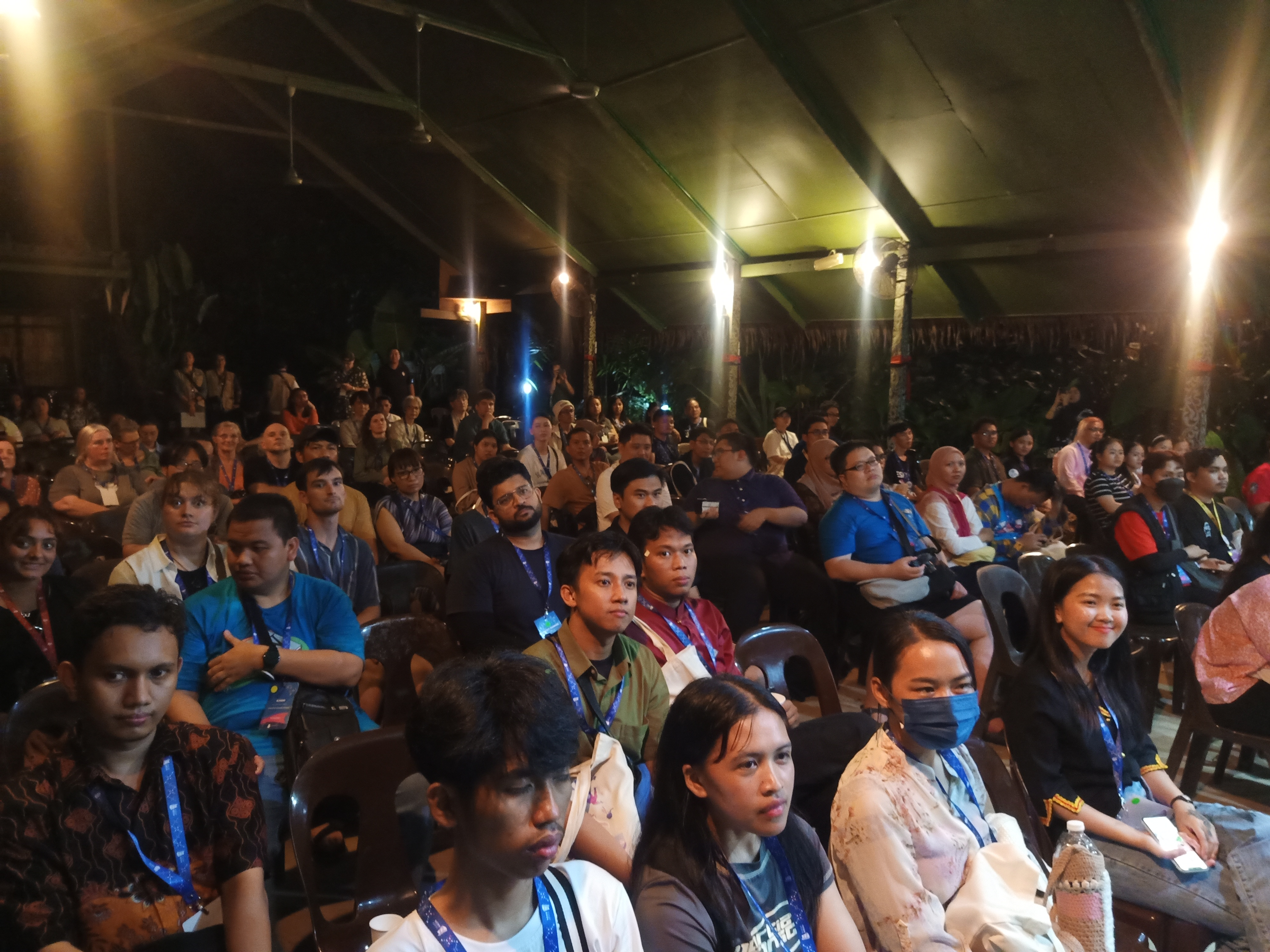
Visitors at the village

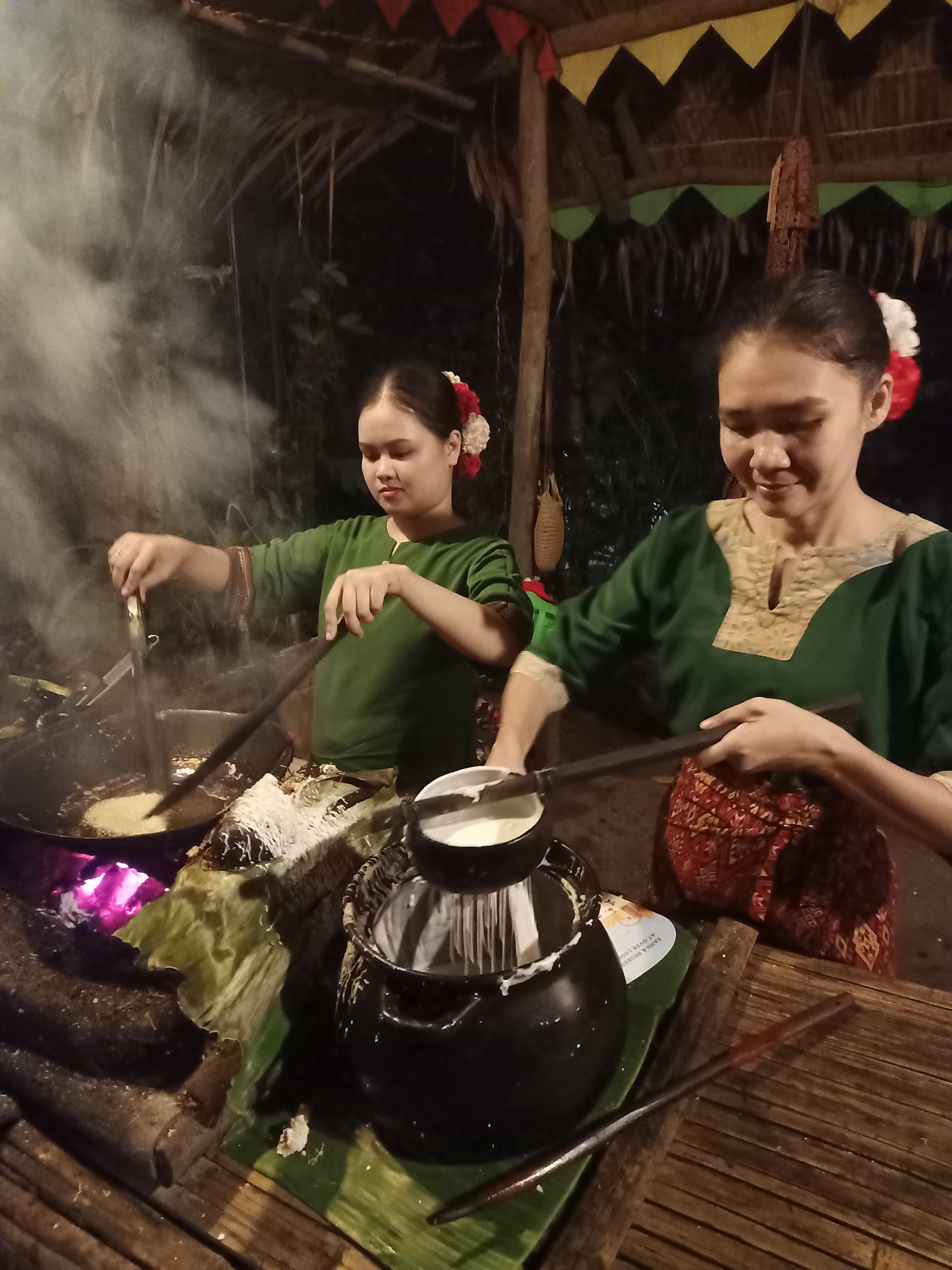
Indigenous women preparing traditional desserts

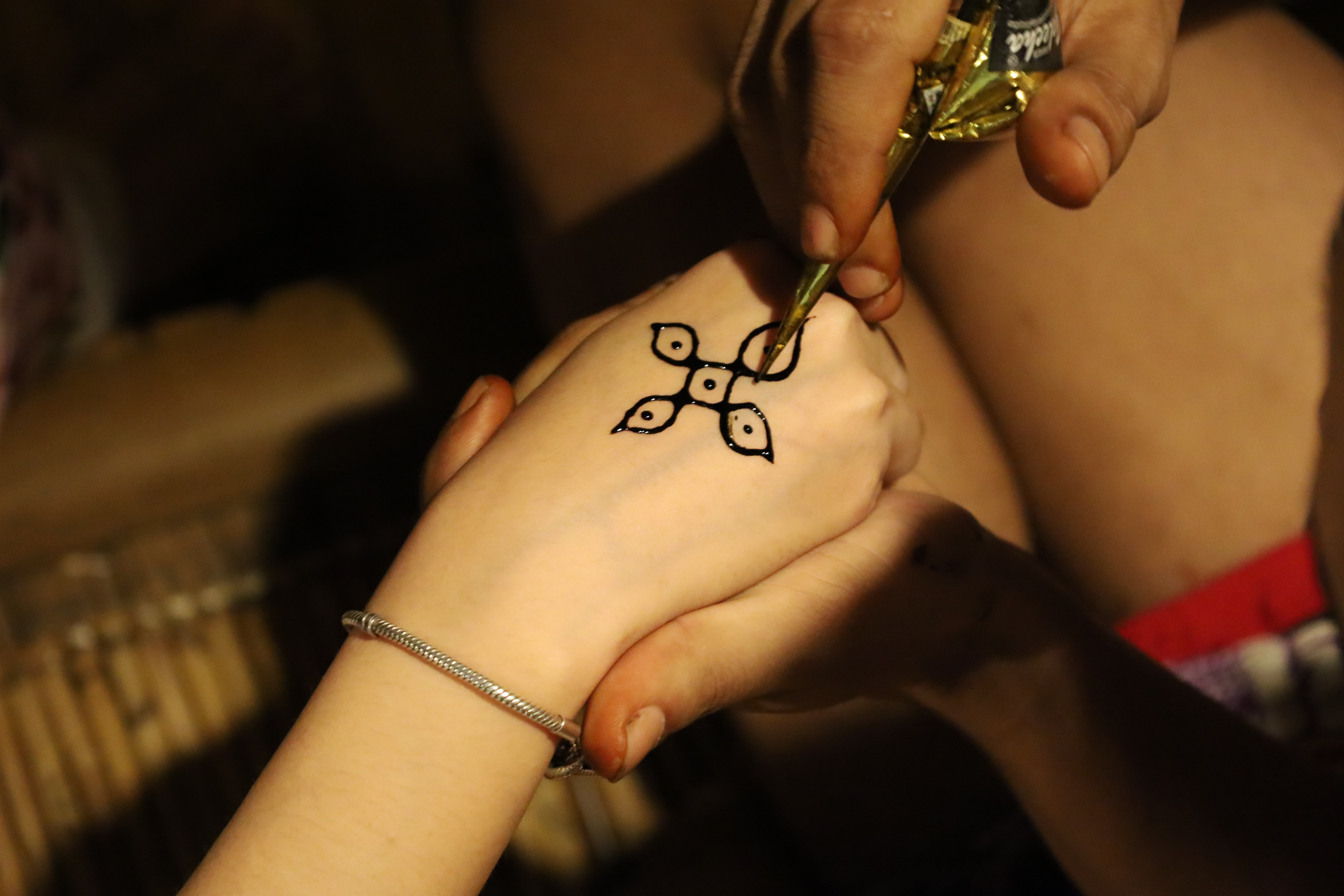
Tattoo making

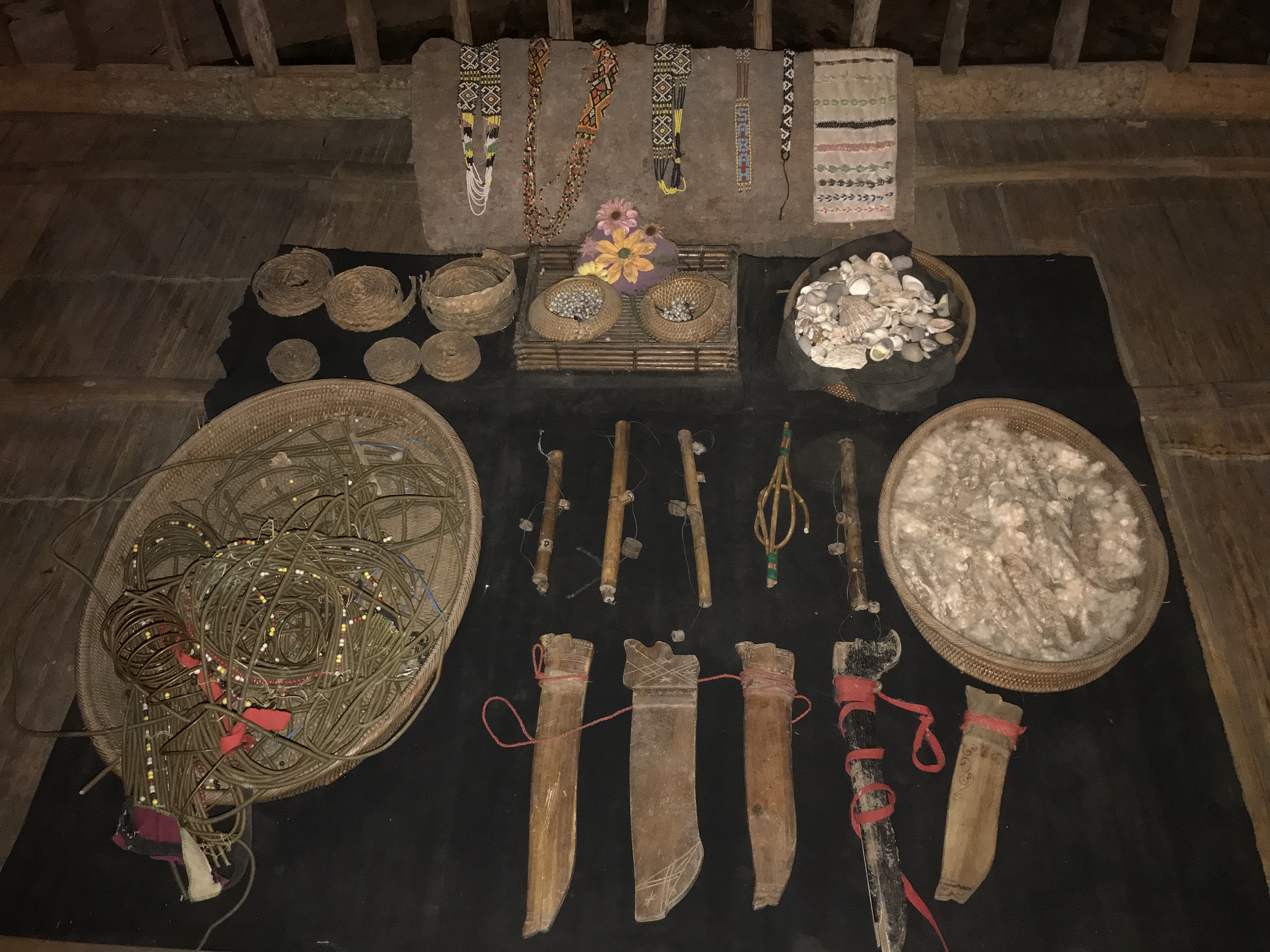
Traditional crafts of the indigenous

== See also ==
- List of open-air and living history museums
