= List of wars involving Cameroon =

This is a list of wars and conflicts involving the Republic of Cameroon and its previous states.

== Pre-Colonial Cameroon (Before 1882) ==
Conflict	Combatant 1	Combatant 2	Results	Head of State	Losses
Fulani War (1804 – 1808)	Sokoto Caliphate; Support: Sultanate of Aïr	Hausa Kingdoms: Gobir; Katsina; Kano; Biram; Daura; Zazzau; Kebbi; And others...; Kanem-Bornu; Oyo Empire	Sokoto victory: Establishment of the Sokoto Caliphate	Usman dan Fodio (Sultan of Sokoto)	Unknown

== Colonial Cameroon (1882–1961) ==
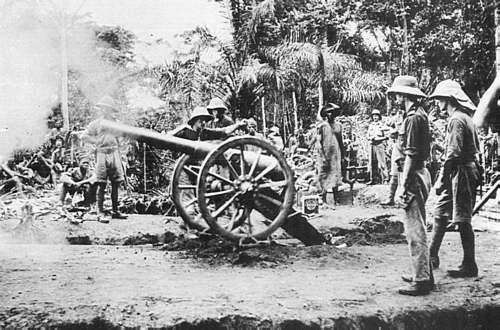
British 12-pounder firing at Fort Dachang in 1915.

- Battle of Kousséri – 1900
- Battle of Nsanakong – 1914
- Battle of Jabassi – 1914
- First Battle of Edea – 1914
- Second Battle of Edea – 1915
- Second Battle of Garua – 1915
- Battle of Ngaundere – 1915
- Battle of Banjo – 1915

Conflict	Combatant 1	Combatant 2	Results	Head of State	Losses
Kamerun campaign (1914 – 1916)	Germany: Kamerun	British Empire: Nigeria; India; France: (French Third Republic) French Equatorial Africa; Belgium: Belgian Congo	Allied victory: Kamerun divided into League of Nations mandates under British and French rule (1919)	Wilhelm II (Emperor of Germany)	c. 5,000 soldiers killed
Cameroon War (1955 – 1964)	Independence War Phase (1955–1960); France (1955–1960): French Cameroon; Civil War Phase (1960–1964); Federal Republic of Cameroon; France	Union of the Peoples of Cameroon; Supported by: People's Socialist Republic of Albania	Government's victory: Cameroonian Independence through the establishment of a Pro-French Regime under Ahmadou Ahidjo; Defeat of UPC insurgents; Continued clashes until 1971	Before 1960 René Coty (President of France) (1955–1959) Charles de Gaulle (President of France) (1959–1960) After 1960 Ahmadou Ahidjo (President of Cameroon)	61,300 – 76,300 civilians killed

== Republic of Cameroon (1961–Present) ==
Conflict	Combatant 1	Combatant 2	Results	Head of State	Losses
First Bakassi insurgency (2006–2018)	Cameroon	Democratic Republic of Bakassi Niger Delta militias Pro-Nigerian militias	Victory: Most militants surrendered in 2009	Paul Biya (President of Cameroon)	Unknown
Central African Republic Civil War (2012 – Present)	Central African Republic; Central African Armed Forces; MINUSCA (since 2014); EUTM-RCA (since 2016) Rwanda (since 2020); Russia (since 2018); Wagner Group; Russian Imperial Movement; Black Russians; Azande Ani Kpi Gbe; Formerly: South Africa (2013); MISCA (2013–2014) MICOPAX (2008–2013): Angola; Cameroon; Chad; Morocco; Uganda; Congo-Brazzaville; DRC; Gabon; Burundi; Equatorial Guinea; São Tomé and Príncipe; France (2013–2021) EUFOR RCA (2014–2015): Estonia; Finland; Georgia; Latvia; Luxembourg; Netherlands; Portugal; Poland; Romania; Spain; Italy	Coalition of Patriots for Change (since 2020): Anti-balaka; FPRC; MPC; PRNC; CMSPR (since 2024) Support: Chad (alleged); RSF; Defunct groups: Séléka (2012–2014): CPJP; CPSK; UFDR; FDPC; FPR; RJ (2013–2018); MNLC (2017–2019); MLCJ (2008–2022); RPRC (2014–2022) UPC (2014–2025); 3R (2015–2025)	Ongoing: Séléka rebel coalition takes power from François Bozizé.; Michel Djotodia, the leader of Séléka, becomes president; President Michel Djotodia abolishes Séléka; Low-level fighting between Ex-Séléka factions and Anti-balaka militias.; President Michel Djotodia resigns amid heavy international pressure. Interim government is formed; Elections conducted in 2016 with Faustin-Archange Touadéra becoming the president; De facto split between ex-Séléka factions controlled north and east and Anti-balaka controlled south and west with a Séléka faction declaring the Republic of Logone.; Fighting between Ex-Séléka factions FPRC and UPC.; Ex-president Bozizé merges all rebel groups and forms the Coalition of Patriots for Change.; Elections in 2021 with Touadéra being re-elected as president.	Paul Biya (President of Cameroon)	Unknown
Boko Haram insurgency (2012 – Present)	Nigeria: Multinational Joint Task Force; Cameroon; Local militias and vigilantes; Foreign mercenaries; Sultan Murad Division (from 2024); Supported by: United States; Russia; China; France; United Kingdom; African Union; Turkey; Pakistan; Canada; Egypt; Israel; European Union; Colombia; Belarus	Islamic State (2015-Present); (Islamic State) ISWA (2015-2016); (Islamic State) ISWAP (from 2016, originally Barnawi faction of Boko Haram); (Islamic State) ISSP; Lakurawa (2016-present); al-Qaeda; Ansaru (2012-present) (Note: The exact origin of Ansaru is unclear, but it had already existed as Boko Haram faction before officially announcing its foundation as separate group on 1 January 2012. The group had no known military presence in Nigeria from 2015, but several of its members appear to be still active. The group appear allied with rag-tag factions in the Nigerian bandit conflict and were recently behind the Abuja–Kaduna train attack); Supported by: Al-Shabaab; AQIM; (Islamic State) Boko Haram (2009-2015, 2016-) (Note: Following Mohammed Yusuf's death, Boko Haram splintered into numerous factions which no longer operated under a unified leadership. Though Abubakar Shekau eventually became the preeminent commander of the movement, he never really controlled all Boko Haram groups. Instead, the factions were loosely allied, but also occasionally clashed with each other. This situation changed in 2015 when Shekau pledged allegiance to ISIL. Regardless, Shekau did never officially renounce his pledge of allegiance to ISIL as a whole; his forces are thus occasionally regarded as "second branch of ISWAP". Overall, the relation of Shekau with ISIL remains confused and ambiguous. In the Battle of Sambisa Forest of 2021 ISWAP fighters killed Shekau and al-Barnawi nominally remains head of ISWAP); Shekau faction; Several minor factions	Ongoing (Map of the current military situation): Expansion of conflict into Cameroon, Chad, Mali, and Niger; Turkish forces and Syrian mercenaries deployed to Niger; Coalition offensive in 2015 forces Boko Haram to retreat into the Sambisa Forest; Abubakar Shekau killed on 19 May 2021 amid ISWAP's capture of Sambisa Forest; Boko Haram largely dissolves and rise of ISWAP	Paul Biya (President of Cameroon)	Unknown
Anglophone Crisis (2017 – Present)	Cameroon	Ambazonia	Ongoing	Paul Biya (President of Cameroon)	120+
Pro-Biafran insurgency in Bakassi (2021–present)	Cameroon; Nigeria	(Republic of Biafra) BNL; Niger Delta militias (from 2025)	Ongoing	Paul Biya (President of Cameroon)	Unknown

== Ambazonia Crisis (2017- Present) ==
Conflict	Combatant 1	Combatant 2	Results	Head of State	Losses
Battle of Batibo (March 3, 2018)	Cameroon	Ambazonia	Indecisive	Paul Biya (President of Cameroon)	Unknown
Ndop prison break (July 28, 2018)	Cameroon	Ambazonia	Ambazonian victory	Paul Biya (President of Cameroon)	unknown
Wum prison break (September 25, 2018)	Cameroon	Ambazonia	Ambazonian victory	Paul Biya (President of Cameroon)	Unknown
Operation Free Bafut (26 April – May 1, 2020)	Cameroon	Ambazonia	Armed separatists weakened but not expelled entirely from Bafut	Paul Biya (President of Cameroon)	Unknown
Operation Bamenda Clean (8 September 2020 – present)	Cameroon	Ambazonia	Ongoing	Paul Biya (President of Cameroon)	Unknown
Operation Bui Clean (May – June 2021)	Cameroon	Ambazonia	Cameroon claims Victory: Ambazonia forces remain a strong presence	Paul Biya (President of Cameroon)	Unknown
September 2021 Bamessing ambush (September 16, 2021)	Cameroon	Ambazonia	Ambazonian victory	Paul Biya (President of Cameroon)	15
Battle of Bambui (July 31, 2022)	Cameroon	Ambazonia	Cameroonian victory	Paul Biya (President of Cameroon)	26
