= Battle of Banjo =

Part of the Kamerun Campaign in World War I

- Part of the Kamerun campaign in World War I
Date	4–6 November 1915 (2 days)
Location	Banjo, Kamerun 6°46′48″N 11°49′12″E
Result	British victory

Belligerents
(United Kingdom of Great Britain and Ireland) British Empire: British Nigeria	German Empire: German Kamerun

Commanders and leaders
(United Kingdom of Great Britain and Ireland) Brig. Gen. Frederick Cunliffe (United Kingdom of Great Britain and Ireland) Cap. Bowyer-Smijth †	Cap. Adolf Schipper †

Strength
~200	23 Europeans; 200 Africans

Casualties and losses
50	3 Europeans; 25 Africans

During the Battle of Banjo or Battle of Banyo, British forces besieged German forces entrenched on the Banjo mountain from 4 to 6 November 1915 during the Kamerun campaign of the First World War. By 6 November much of the German force had deserted, while the rest surrendered. This led to an Entente victory, and marked the breakdown of German resistance in northern Kamerun.

== Background ==
Following the outbreak of war between Britain and Germany in the summer of 1914, British forces in neighboring Nigeria mounted an attack on the German forts at Garua in northern Kamerun. After failing to take the forts and suffering heavy casualties at the First Battle of Garua, British forces in the border regions adopted a defensive strategy. The German commander at Garua, Von Crailsheim gained confidence and mounted a raid across the border which was repulsed at the Battle of Gurin in April 1915. Following the German defeat, Captain Adolf Schipper led the wounded German soldiers to the fort at Banjo to the south. The German raid stimulated retaliation from the British commander in the area, Hugh Cunliffe who went on to finally capture the forts at Garua at the Second Battle of Garua. In July, Cunliffe went on to win the Battle of Ngaundere further south. Due to heavy rains however, Cunliffe chose to take part in the Siege of Mora instead of making an advance southward to the German base at Jaunde (today Yaoundé).

Because of an improvement in weather conditions, Cunliffe resumed his push south in October. On 22 October, the town of Bamenda was occupied by Cunliffe's forces. British forces occupied the village Banjo on 24 October. On 3 November the column occupied the town of Tibati, approximately 90 kilometers southwest of Ngaundere. The German fort on a hill near the town of Banjo was near to the border with Nigeria and was the last German stronghold in northern Kamerun that stood between Cunliffe and Jaunde. The fort was situated atop a mountain with steep slopes but a relatively flat summit. A number of boulders were located on the slopes of the mountain. In preparation for the battle, German forces built approximately 300 sangars between these boulders and constructed numerous entrenchments on the slopes of the hill. Under the command of Captain Adolf Schipper, the fort had prepared itself for a long siege like the ones seen at Mora and Garua. Before the battle took place, the garrison had even prepared the top of the mountain for agricultural cultivation. By October 1915 the fort was protected by 23 European officers and approximately 200 native Askaris.

== Battle ==
While British forces had occupied the town of Banjo since late October, fighting did not start until an attempt was made to capture the fort. On the morning of 4 November, a British company under Captain Bowyer-Smijth launched an assault on the German defenses with the support of three artillery pieces that had been brought. Due to dense fog, the British force was able to surprise the German defenders. During the conflict that ensued, Bowyer-Smijth was killed in action near the summit along with others from his company, which retreated back down the mountain. That night five British companies attempted another assault on the hill. The Germans were able to hold off the attack through the bombardment of the oncoming infantry with dynamite. On 5 November, British forces remained positioned on the slopes of the hill approximately 100 meters from the summit. At this time the three British artillery pieces began to run out of ammunition. By that evening however, more had arrived which enabled another assault on the fort. On the night of 5 November, during a thunderstorm, the final attack was made. When Nigerian troops finally reached the summit, fighting at close quarters ensued that cost both sides heavy casualties. During the battle, much of the German garrison had deserted while those that remained surrendered by the morning of 6 November 1915. The German commander, Captain Adolf Schipper, was killed during the battle along with approximately 27 other German soldiers. British losses included around 50 killed.

== Aftermath ==
Following the battle, British forces were able to capture most of the German deserters. When the British occupied the fort at Banjo they found it to be a considerably strong position with sufficient ammunition and supplies for further resistance. On the summit the Germans had pigs, sheep and 226 cattle. The British victory at Banjo meant that German resistance in northern Kamerun was virtually over. The forces of Cunliffe in the north were now able to come into contact with those of Dobell, in the southwest. The capture of the German fort here allowed for a second assault on Jaunde and the German escape to the neutral Spanish colony of Río Muni.
