= Battle of Tepe =

WW1 Battle in Kamerun (August 1914)

Coordinates: 9°20.47′N 12°52.39′E

- Part of the Kamerun campaign in World War I
Date	25 August 1914
Location	Tepe, German Kamerun
Result	British victory

Belligerents
British Empire: British Nigeria	Germany: German Kamerun

Commanders and leaders
(United Kingdom of Great Britain and Ireland) Col. MacLear	(German Empire) Lt. Milbrat †

Units involved
(Nigeria) West African Frontier Force	Schutztruppe

Strength
Unknown	Unknown

Casualties and losses
2 officers	5 officers

The Battle of Tepe (or Tebe) on 25 August 1914 was the first skirmish between German and British forces during the Kamerun campaign in of the First World War. The conflict took place on the border between British Nigeria and German Kamerun, ending in British victory and German withdrawal from the station.

== Prelude ==
On 4 August 1914, Britain declared war on the German Empire at the beginning of the First World War. On 8 August, a mounted detachment from the West African Frontier Force embarked from Kano in northern British Nigeria towards the German colony of Kamerun. These first British forces crossed the border into German territory on 25 August.

== Battle ==
British cavalry came into contact with German forces at the border station at Tepe on the Benue River on 25 August. After sharp fighting German forces withdrew and the British occupied the station. Few casualties resulted from the battle. The British occupation of the station gave their forces the opportunity to push further east to the German stronghold at Garua. The British were defeated in their attempt to take the forts there at the First Battle of Garua only days after the conflict at Tepe.
