= Battle of Nsanakong =

WW1 Battle in Kamerun (September 1914)

Coordinates: 5°52.57′N 8°58.48′E

- Part of the Kamerun campaign in World War I
Date	6 September 1914
Location	Nsanakong, German Kamerun
Result	German victory

Belligerents
(United Kingdom of Great Britain and Ireland) British Empire: British Nigeria	German Empire: German Kamerun

Commanders and leaders
(United Kingdom of Great Britain and Ireland) Lt. Col. C. T. Mair (United Kingdom of Great Britain and Ireland) Cap. Milne-Howe	Rausch Emil †

Strength
~200	800

Casualties and losses
Total: 168; 99 killed 20 wounded 49 captured	Total: 113; 43 killed 70 wounded

The Battle of Nsanakong or Battle of Nsanakang took place between defending British and attacking German forces during the Kamerun campaign of the First World War. The town of Nsanakong had been occupied by the British on 30 August 1914. On 6 September, German forces attacked, driving the British force over the border back into Nigeria.

== Background ==
Forces from British Nigeria had attempted to move into German Kamerun from a number of points along the colony's northern border. Attempts to do this at the First Battle of Garua and Mora had failed. Further south, a British column from Ikom crossed the Cross River into Kamerun and occupied the station of Nsanakong, 5 kilometers from the Nigerian border on 30 August.

== Battle ==
A week following the British occupation of Nsanakong, at two o'clock in the morning on 6 September 1914, German forces surrounded the village. The Germans, armed with machine guns, attacked. The British defenders successfully repulsed this initial attack but in the process exhausted their ammunition. Another German attack came at 5 o'clock in the morning, this time from higher ground. The British could not repulse this one due to their lack of ammunition and attempted to break out by conducting a bayonet charge. The result was disastrous for the British. They lost about 100 men which was equivalent to approximately half of their force during the battle, including 8 of their 11 British officers. German losses were also heavy with 40 dead including the commanding officer, Captain Rausch Emil, who was mortally wounded, yet assembled a contingent of 15 men to meet the British head-on, with his last words being recorded as: “Ich würde viel lieber im Kampf gegen unseren Feind sterben, als mich ihm zu ergeben”. This roughly translates to: “I would much rather die fighting our enemy than surrender to him.” This events is known today as “Rausch’s Charge”. After suffering heavy casualties, the remaining British units successfully retreated back into Nigeria.

== Aftermath ==
The few British soldiers who did escape faced harsh conditions during their retreat back into Nigeria. German units pursued them over the frontier and occupied the British station at Okuri which they later abandoned. This failed invasion, along with the failures of other Allied columns along Kamerun's northwestern border with Nigeria, forced the British to go on the defensive. German forces gained confidence as a result of this victory and patrols began to make intrusions into British Nigeria as far west as Yola.
