= Battle of Gurin =

WW1 Battle in Kamerun (April 1915)

Coordinates: 9°6′53.6″N 12°52′38.2″E

- Part of the Kamerun campaign in World War I
Date	29 April 1915
Location	Gurin, Nigeria
Result	British victory

Belligerents
British Empire: British Nigeria	Germany: German Kamerun

Commanders and leaders
(United Kingdom of Great Britain and Ireland) Cap. Derek Pawle † (United Kingdom of Great Britain and Ireland) Lt. Joseph F. J. Fitzpatrick	Cap. von Crailsheim; Cap. Schipper

Strength
42	350–400

Casualties and losses
13	45

The Battle of Gurin took place on 29 April 1915 during the Kamerun campaign of World War I in Gurin, British Nigeria near the border with German Kamerun. The battle was one of the largest of the German forays into the British colony. It ended in a successful British repulsion of the German force.

== Background ==
By April 1915, British forces were concentrated mainly in southern and central Kamerun, leaving much of the Nigerian border with the German colony relatively undefended. Following the failed siege of the main German outpost in northwestern Kamerun at the First Battle of Garua in August 1914, German forces in the area had substantial freedom of movement. This allowed Captain von Crailsheim, the German commander at Garua, to conduct a number of raids into British Nigeria. In late April, a force commanded by von Crailsheim joined with a smaller one commanded by Captain Schipper to attack the village of Gurin, just inside the Nigerian border

The village of Gurin was protected by one circular fort and a garrison of 42 men consisting mostly of policemen commanded by Captain Derek Pawle.

== Battle ==
At daybreak on 29 April 1915, the German force surrounded and attacked the fort at Gurin. Early in the battle, the British commander Captain Pawle was killed in action, leaving Lieutenant Joseph F. J. Fitzpatrick to lead the defense of the fort. The Germans brought up five machine guns, which were able to damage the fort's defenses. Despite superiority in both manpower and weapons, the Germans did not succeed in capturing the fort at Gurin. At around midday, after seven hours of fighting, von Crailsheim and his force withdrew from Gurin The British lost 13 men or approximately 30% of their force through the battle. The German unit lost 40 African and 5 European soldiers.

== Aftermath ==
After the battle, Captain Schipper took wounded German troops southwards while von Crailsheim lead the rest back to Garua. British forces attempted to intercept the returning German units but failed. The engagement was technically a failure for the Germans but von Crailsheim did succeed in inflicting significant casualties on the force at Garin and surprising British military leadership by penetrating the border.

The action that took place at Gurin made the Allied commander in western Kamerun, Colonel Cunliffe, uneasy about the freedom of movement that the German force stationed at Garua had. The garrison there had not been seriously engaged by Allied forces since the First Battle of Garua in August 1914. The battle at Garin set into motion another British and French attempt to finally take the German forts at Garua. Ultimately, this conflict resulted in a successful defense of Gurin and the Second Battle of Garua.
