= Second Battle of Garua =

WW1 Battle in Kamerun (June 1915)

Coordinates: 09°18′N 13°24′E

- Part of the Kamerun campaign in World War I
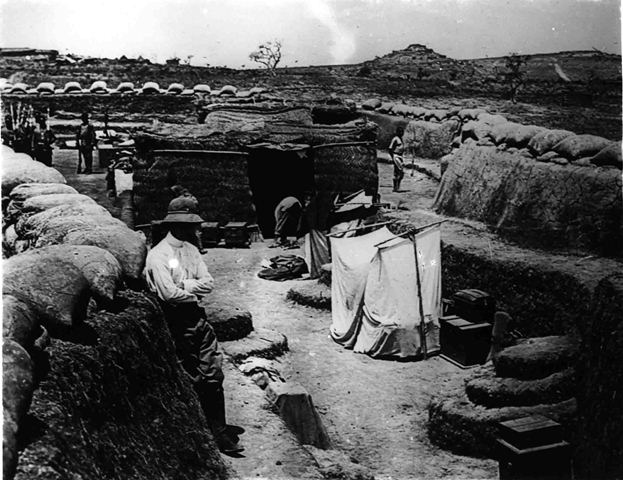
- German trenches at Garua during the Kamerun Campaign
Date	31 May – 10 June 1915
Location	Garua, Kamerun
Result	Allied victory

Belligerents
British Empire: British Nigeria; France: (French Third Republic) French Equatorial Africa	German Empire: German Kamerun

Commanders and leaders
(United Kingdom of Great Britain and Ireland) Brigadier General Frederick Hugh Cunliffe	Captain von Crailsheim (surrendered)

Units involved
West African Frontier Force	

Strength
	~500

Casualties and losses
None	249 captured others killed or deserted

The Second Battle of Garua took place from 31 May to 10 June 1915 during the Kamerun campaign of the First World War in Garua, German Kamerun. The battle was between a combined French and British force and defending German garrison and resulted in an Allied victory.

== Background ==
Since the British failure at the First Battle of Garua in August 1914, the German force at Garua, under Captain von Crailsheim, had been afforded considerable freedom of movement. This was demonstrated by a series of incursions into British Nigeria which culminated in the Battle of Gurin in April 1915. This was one of the largest German raids into Nigeria, and shocked the recently appointed Allied commander in the region, Colonel Cunliffe. The foray prompted a renewed British and French attempt to take the German forts at Garua. A British force under the command of Cunliffe arrived in Gurin the day after the battle, later joined by a French force. A 12-pounder gun was borrowed from the British cruiser HMS Challenger and a 95 mm naval gun from the French before the force moved out toward Garua in late April.

The German forts at Garua had undergone considerable construction and fortification following the repulsion of British forces at the First Battle of Garua, eight months earlier. Von Crailsheim had employed approximately 2,000 native laborers to strengthen his fortifications with barbed wire, earthworks, and dugouts, in preparation for a long siege. He also reinforced the garrison with German sailors who had been evacuated from their ships on the colony's rivers. The German fortresses also possessed eleven machine guns and six field guns.

== Siege and battle ==
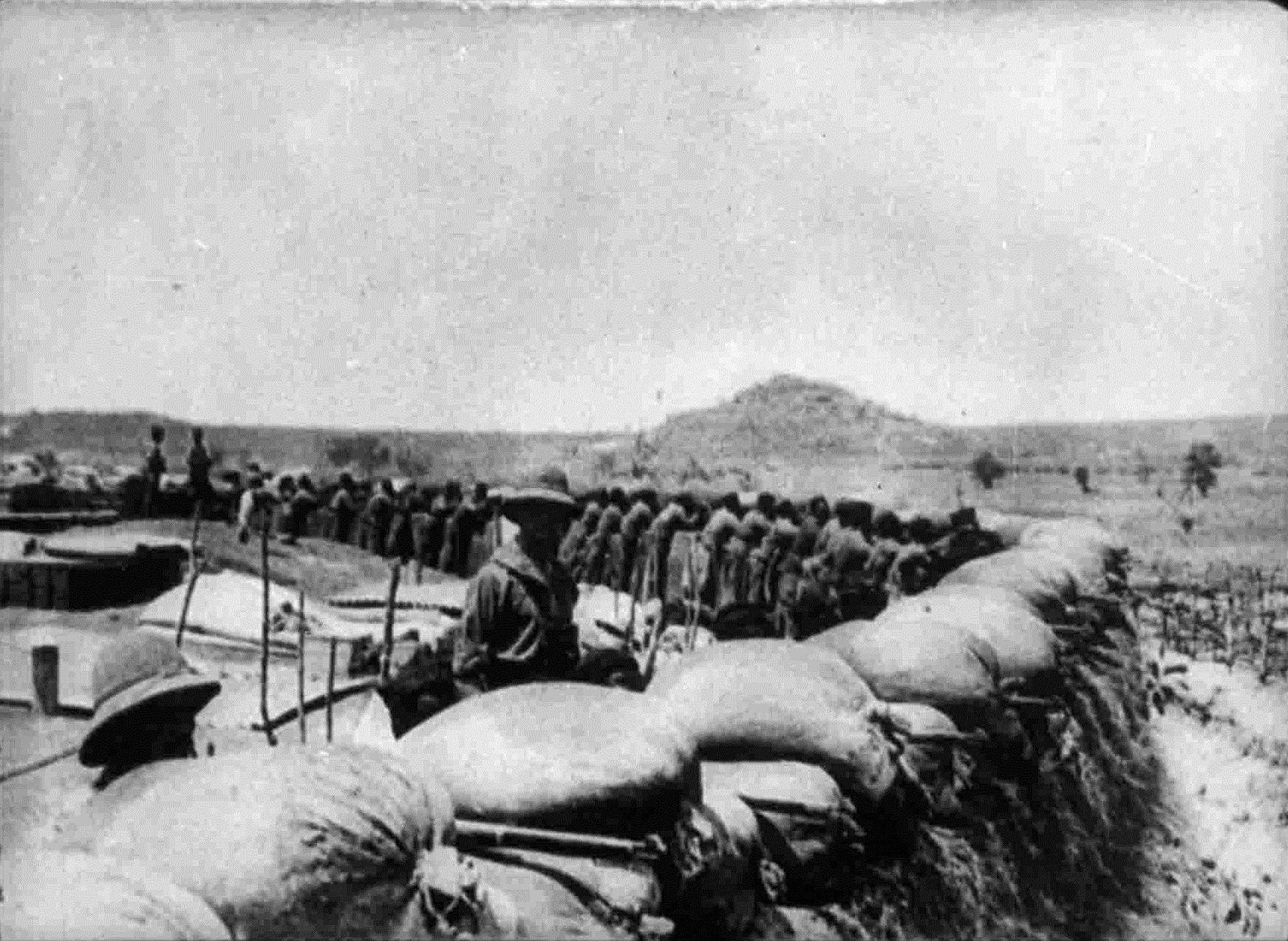
German troops manning the defenses at Garua during the Kamerun Campaign

French and British forces entrenched themselves around the forts at Garua and began to lay siege to the position on 31 May 1915. Following an assessment of the German defenses, Cunliffe came to the conclusion that the weakest positions could be attacked from the north. He concentrated his attacks there and a series of trenches were dug opposite these weaker positions. Each night sapping and mining operations would take place weakening the German defenses even further. The British and French trenches moved closer to the forts as these operations went on. The Germans responded to this with constant but somewhat ineffective fire from the forts.

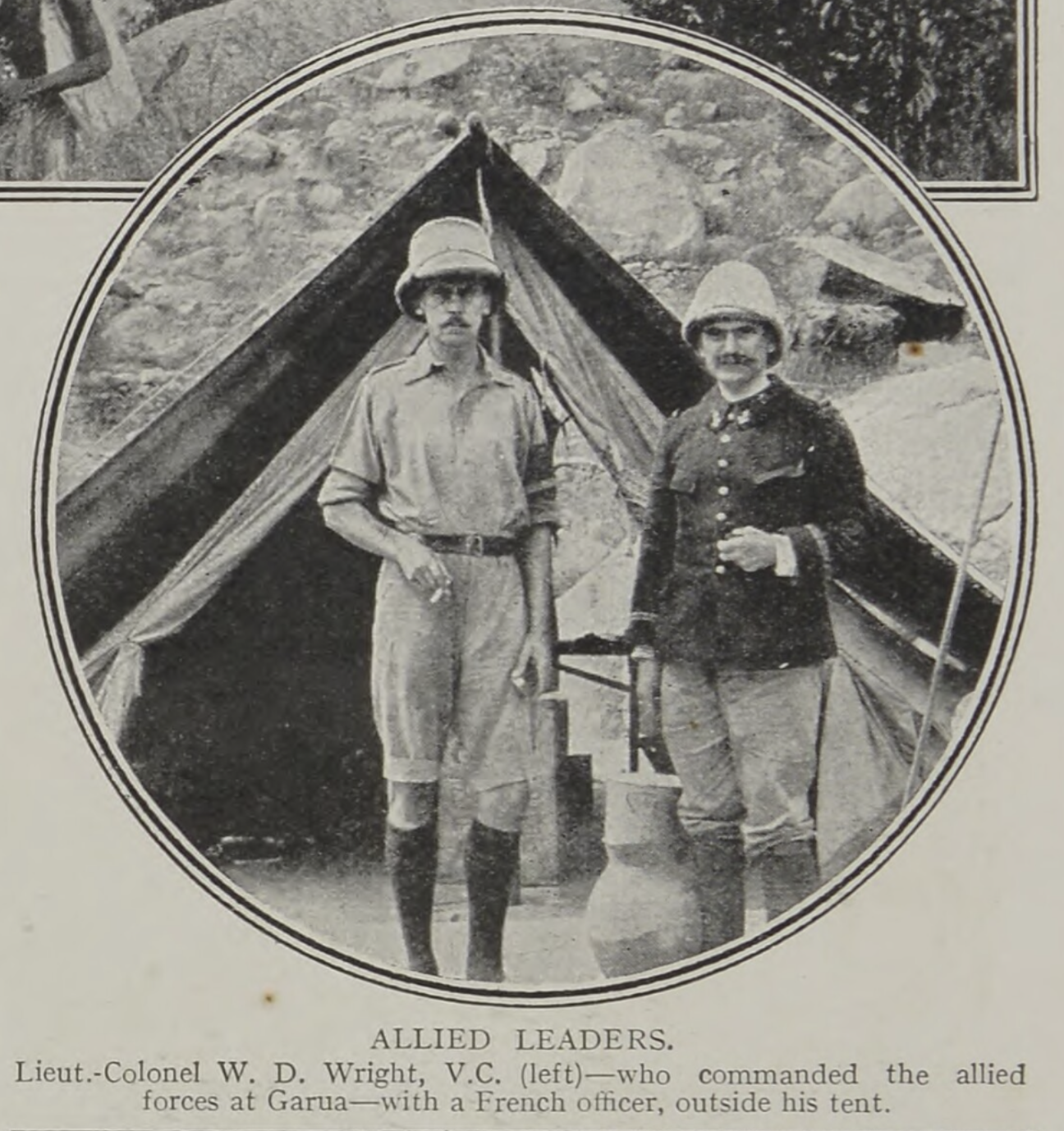
Lieut.-Colonel W. D. Wright, V.C. (left), who commanded the allied forces at Garua, with a French officer, outside his tent (c. 1915)

The bombardment from the large naval guns succeeded greatly in damaging the German defenses. The shelling also eroded the morale of the German troops defending the forts which had been built up after their initial successes in the war. One shell killed 20 German soldiers. On 9 June, many of the native soldiers in the German forts began to mutiny and refused to man the defenses. One group of deserters attempted to break through the British and French lines and escape but was forced back to the forts by rifle fire. Another group took horses and rode past the Allied lines to the Benue River which was flooded at the time. While attempting to swim across the river, many of the native soldiers drowned. 70 bodies were later recovered from the river and only 45 seem to have managed to escape. Those who did however were attacked by a British detachment and pursued by French cavalry.

After losing a large proportion of the garrison and suffering severe bombardment, white flags rose from the German forts at around 4 p.m. on 10 June. Von Crailsheim made a request for full honors of war and a 24-hour armistice to which the Allied commander refused. At 6:30 p.m. the German commander surrendered unconditionally, and on 11 June Allied troops entered the forts at Garua. Only 37 Germans and 212 natives remained from the once larger garrison. The rest had either deserted or been killed in the bombardment. According to some sources, the Allies did not suffer any serious casualties during the conflict.

== Aftermath ==
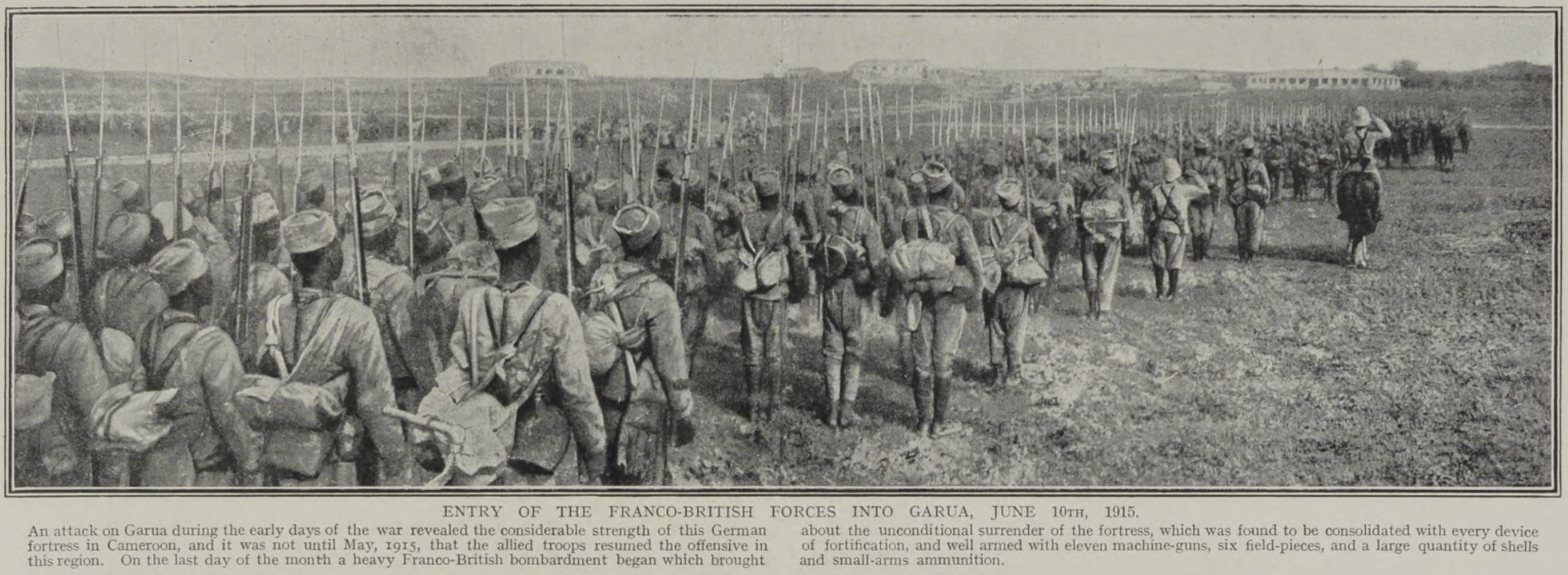
Entry of the Franco-British forces into Garua, 10 June 1915

With the German surrender on 10 June, the remaining garrison was taken prisoner. The bounty of weapons, ammunition and supplies that had been prepared in anticipation for a longer siege was captured by the Allies. The capture of the German forts at Garua left the besieged stronghold at Mora isolated in northern Kamerun until its surrender at the end of the campaign. Clearing the north of German forces allowed Cunliffe, who had once been on the defensive, to push further into central Kamerun. After the success at Garua, he led his force south to the town of Ngaundere which was taken after some fighting.
