= Battle of Ngaundere =

WW1 Battle in Kamerun (June 1915)

Coordinates: 07°19.3′N 13°35.1′E

- Part of the Kamerun campaign in World War I
Date	29 June 1915
Location	Ngaoundéré, Kamerun
Result	Allied victory

Belligerents
(United Kingdom of Great Britain and Ireland) British Empire: British Nigeria	German Empire: German Kamerun

Commanders and leaders
(United Kingdom of Great Britain and Ireland) Brig. Gen. Frederick Cunliffe (United Kingdom of Great Britain and Ireland) Lt. Col. Webb-Bowen (United Kingdom of Great Britain and Ireland) Cap. Fowle	Unknown

Strength
200	Unknown

Casualties and losses
Light	Unknown

The Battle of Ngaundere or Battle of Ngaoundéré was a small engagement fought between German and British forces on 29 June 1915 during the Kamerun campaign of World War I. It resulted in a German defeat and British occupation of the town.

== Background ==
Following the Allied victory and German surrender at the Second Battle of Garua, the commander of French and British forces in the area, General Cunliffe, was confident in pushing deeper into the German colony of Kamerun. He moved a detachment of his force under the command of Lieutenant Colonel Webb-Bowen 150 miles southeast to the town of Ngaundere on the road leading from the north of the colony to the central plateau where the new German capital and concentration of military forces was.

== Battle ==
The small advance unit under the command of Captain Fowle arrived at Ngaundere on 29 June 1915 after marching through a severe storm that produced a tornado. When the main body of the unit arrived, the storm still lingered over the town. As a result, the British troops were able to surprise soldiers stationed at many of the German outposts and take them captive before any fighting occurred. At some of the outposts however, fighting did occur resulting in light casualties to the British unit. After the German force had been driven from Ngaundere, it launched a counterattack which the British repulsed.

== Aftermath ==
The expulsion of German forces from their outposts in Ngaundere meant that significant resistance in the north of Kamerun would be absent. It allowed General Cunliffe's columns the freedom to move further south into the central plateau of the colony. The British did pursue the German forces who had once occupied Ngaundere who withdrew to Tangere. The British took this position without a fight on 12 July and repulsed a German attempt to recapture it on 23 July. The German force withdrew once again in the direction of Tibati. However, due to heavy rains and the remaining German stronghold at Mora, Cunliffe would not continue his advance southward until October. His force arrived on 23 August to assist in the Siege of Mora which would last until the end of the campaign.
