= First Battle of Garua =

WW1 battle in Kamerun (August 1914)

Coordinates: 09°18′N 13°24′E

- Part of the Kamerun campaign in World War I
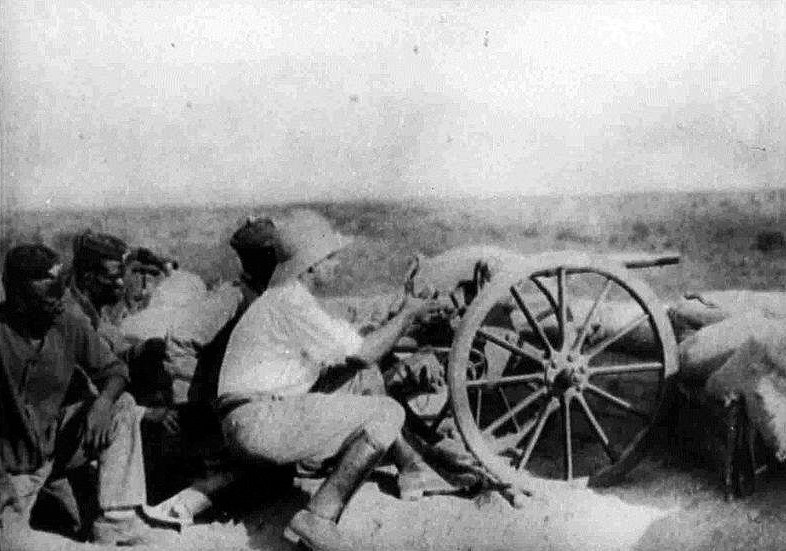
- A German officer fires a gun from the defences at Garua during the Kamerun Campaign
Date	29–31 August 1914
Location	Garua, German Kamerun and British Nigeria
Result	German victory

Belligerents
British Empire: British Nigeria	(German Empire) Germany: German Kamerun

Commanders and leaders
(United Kingdom of Great Britain and Ireland) Col. C. H. P. Carter (United Kingdom of Great Britain and Ireland) Col. MacLear † (United Kingdom of Great Britain and Ireland) Maj. Puckle †	Cap. Kurt Rügland

Strength
600	750-900

Casualties and losses
Europeans: Majority of officer corps Nigerians: 250	28 killed 75 wounded

The First Battle of Garua took place from 29 to 31 August 1914 during the Kamerun campaign of the First World War between German and invading British forces in northern Kamerun at Garua. It was the first significant action to take place in the campaign and resulted in the German repulsion of the British force.

== Background ==
On 25 August 1914 (three weeks after war had broken out in Europe), British cavalry from the West African Frontier Force crossed the border from Nigeria and seized Tepe, a German border post to the north of Garua. The post's occupation gave British forces a foothold in northern Kamerun, from which they could attack the many German forts that protected the region, including the ones at Garua.

== German defences at Garua ==
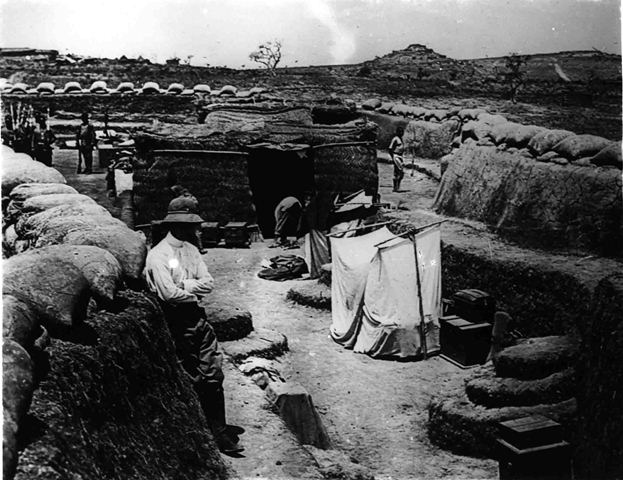
German trenches in Garua during the Kamerun Campaign

The Germans had constructed five modern forts at Garua, each of which were situated to give supporting fire to another if needed. The earthworks included deep trenches and dugouts with overhead protection, ringed with barbed wire and manned by three companies of African Askaris under German officers and NCOs. Artillery would be needed to cause any significant damage to the fortifications.

== The battle ==
From Tepe, British forces under the command of Colonel MacLear turned southwards towards the stronghold at Garua. They arrived on 29 August and dug entrenchments around the German forts. That night the British attacked the fortifications, charging over 400 meters of open ground. After suffering heavy casualties they successfully captured one of the five forts. The following day German forces counter-attacked, pushing the British out. Nigerian troops reportedly fled, leaving British officers alone in the trenches. As the British force fled the Germans continued their counter-attack, pushing them out of Kamerun completely and pursuing them into Nigeria for days afterwards. The majority of the officers of the British units were killed, including the commanding officer, Colonel MacLear. Forty percent of the native Nigerian troops were lost. The Germans suffered relatively minor losses in comparison.

== Aftermath ==
The action at Garua, as well as battles in other areas along Kamerun's north-western border with Nigeria, turned out to be relatively successful for the Germans. They were able to repulse each British thrust that came at them during the opening days of the conflict, and even put themselves in position to threaten Calabar, the main port in eastern Nigeria. The victory at Garua enhanced the morale of German Askaris significantly and stalled Allied advances into northern Kamerun until mid-1915, when the Second Battle of Garua resulted in British victory.
