= Indonesia at the FIFA World Cup =

International football delegation

Indonesia has appeared in the FIFA World Cup finals on one occasion. The nation's sole appearance took place at the 1938 tournament in France, when the team entered the competition as the Dutch East Indies, then a colony of the Netherlands. That 1938 participation remains Indonesia's only World Cup finals appearance to date.

The Dutch East Indies gained independence from the Netherlands and became known as Indonesia in 1949, and FIFA considers Indonesia as the successor of the Dutch East Indies. The Dutch East Indies played their first World Cup finals match against Hungary in the round of 16 of the 1938 tournament, losing 6–0. The straight knockout format used at the time made it the only game the team played at the tournament. Thus, Indonesia is the sole record holder for the fewest matches played (1) at a World Cup, and one of several to have scored no goals.

== Dutch East Indies at the 1938 FIFA World Cup ==
The team was one of three non-European participants in the tournament in addition to Brazil and Cuba.

The Dutch East Indies were placed in qualifying group 12 with Japan. When Japan withdrew, FIFA decided that the Dutch East Indies would have to play against one of the countries from group 11. The United States was selected by lot. This match would be played on 29 May 1938 in Rotterdam, at De Kuip. However, the United States also withdrew, meaning that the Dutch East Indies qualified for the final round without playing.

In preparation for the tournament, the team made a long boat trip to the Netherlands to train at HBS in The Hague. A practice match against HBS was also played, which ended in a 2–2 draw. Furthermore, there was a friendly match against Haarlem, and this match ended in a 5–3 victory for the Dutch East Indies.

Because the Netherlands also took part, the Wilhelmus, the national anthem of the Netherlands, was heard twice at the event. The team consisted only of players from the Nederlandsch-Indische Voetbal Unie (NIVU) and the Dutch association chairman Johannes Mastenbroek acted as trainer. The PSSI (Indonesia's current football federation), which the NIVU collaborated with, was not represented and among the players there were several of Chinese descent.

The team head coach Johannes Mastenbroek called to the tournament consisted of the following players:

| Name | Club | Particularities |
|---|---|---|
| Mo Heng Tan | HCTNH (Malang) | |
| Achmad Nawir | HBS (Surabaya) | |
| Hong Djien Tan | Tiong Hwa (Surabaya) | |
| French Meeng | SVBB (Batavia) | |
| Tjaak Pattiwael | Young Ambon (Batavia) | |
| Hans Taihuttu | Young Ambon (Batavia) | |
| Suvarte Soedarmadji | HBS (Surabaya) | |
| Anwar Sutan | VIOS (Batavia) | |
| Henk Zomers | Hercules (Surabaya) | |
| French Hukom | Sparta (Bandoeng) | |
| Jack Samuels | Excelsior (Surabaya) | |
| Leen van Beuzekom | Hercules (Batavia) | Didn't play along |
| Jan Harting | HBS (Surabaya) | Didn't play along |
| Mo Heng Bing | Tiong Hwa (Surabaya) | Didn't play along |
| Gerrit Faulhaber | Go Ahead (Semarang) | Didn't play along |
| Rudi Telwe | HBS (Surabaya) | Didn't play along |
| See Han Tan | Tiong Hwa (Surabaya) | Didn't play along |
| G. van den Burgh | SVV (Semarang) | Didn't play along |

The Dutch East Indies only played one match at the tournament, with the 6–0 defeat against Hungary eliminating them in the first round.

=== Hungary v Dutch East Indies ===
5 June 1938
17:00 WEST (UTC+01)

| Hungary | 6–0 | Dutch East Indies |
|---|---|---|
| Kohut 14'; Toldi 16'; Sárosi 25', 88'; Zsengellér 30', 67' | Report |

Vélodrome Municipal, Reims
Attendance: ~8,000
Referee: Roger Conrié (France)

| Hungary | Dutch East Indies |

| GK | József Háda |
| DF | Lajos Korányi |
| DF | Sándor Bíró |
| MF | József Turay |
| MF | Gyula Lázár |
| MF | István Balogh |
| FW | Géza Toldi |
| FW | György Sárosi (c) |
| FW | Ferenc Sas |
| FW | Gyula Zsengellér |
| FW | Vilmos Kohut |
Manager:
(Hungary) Károly Dietz and Alfréd Schaffer

| GK | Mo Heng Tan |
| DF | Frans Hu Kon |
| DF | Jack Samuels |
| MF | Achmad Nawir (c) |
| MF | Frans Meeng |
| MF | Sutan Anwar |
| FW | The Hong Djien |
| FW | Isaak Pattiwael |
| FW | Hans Taihuttu |
| FW | Suvarte Soedarmadji |
| FW | Henk Zomers |
Manager:
(Netherlands) Johannes Mastenbroek

Man of the Match:

Assistant referees:
Charles de la Salle (France)
Karl Weingartner (Germany)

== Afterwards ==
After the World Cup, the Dutch East Indies played on 26 June 1938 against the Netherlands, losing 9–2. This match is not considered an official match. Two days later, they lost 2–0 to the Hague selection.

The 1938 participation was, as of the 2026 World Cup, the only one in the history of Indonesia. The Dutch East Indies gained independence in 1945 as Indonesia, and the Netherlands recognised Indonesia's independence in 1949. After independence, Indonesia has never managed to qualify for the FIFA World Cup.

The team took part in their first World Cup qualifying campaign as Indonesia in the qualification for the 1958 tournament. They got past China in the first round, but refused to play against Israel. The team withdrew in 1962, and did not enter qualifying for 1966 and 1970 due to an unfavourable political situation, before re-entering in 1974. The team has not qualified as an independent country, going furthest in the qualification in 1986 and 2026.

== Overall record ==
| Final | | | | | | | | | | Qualification | | | | | |
| Year | Round | Position | Pld | W | D | L | GF | GA | Squad | Pld | W | D | L | GF | GA |
as Dutch East Indies
| (Uruguay) 1930 | Did not enter | | | | | | | | | Did not enter | | | | | |
| (Italy) 1934 | Did not enter | | | | | | | | | Did not enter | | | | | |
| (France) 1938 | Round of 16 | 15th | 1 | 0 | 0 | 1 | 0 | 6 | Squad | Automatically qualified | | | | | |
as Indonesia
| (Brazil) 1950 | Withdrew | | | | | | | | | Withdrew | | | | | |
| (Switzerland) 1954 | Did not enter | | | | | | | | | Did not enter | | | | | |
| (Sweden) 1958 | Withdrew during qualification | | | | | | | | | 3 | 1 | 1 | 1 | 5 | 4 |
| (Chile) 1962 | Withdrew | | | | | | | | | Withdrew | | | | | |
| (England) 1966 | Did not enter | | | | | | | | | Did not enter | | | | | |
| (Mexico) 1970 | Did not enter | | | | | | | | | Did not enter | | | | | |
| (West Germany) 1974 | Did not qualify | | | | | | | | | 6 | 1 | 2 | 3 | 6 | 13 |
| (Argentina) 1978 | Did not qualify | | | | | | | | | 4 | 1 | 1 | 2 | 7 | 7 |
| (Spain) 1982 | Did not qualify | | | | | | | | | 8 | 2 | 2 | 4 | 5 | 14 |
| (Mexico) 1986 | Did not qualify | | | | | | | | | 8 | 4 | 1 | 3 | 9 | 10 |
| (Italy) 1990 | Did not qualify | | | | | | | | | 6 | 1 | 3 | 2 | 5 | 10 |
| (United States) 1994 | Did not qualify | | | | | | | | | 8 | 1 | 0 | 7 | 6 | 19 |
| (France) 1998 | Did not qualify | | | | | | | | | 6 | 1 | 4 | 1 | 11 | 6 |
| (South Korea) (Japan) 2002 | Did not qualify | | | | | | | | | 6 | 4 | 0 | 2 | 16 | 7 |
| (Germany) 2006 | Did not qualify | | | | | | | | | 6 | 2 | 1 | 3 | 8 | 12 |
| (South Africa) 2010 | Did not qualify | | | | | | | | | 2 | 0 | 0 | 2 | 1 | 11 |
| (Brazil) 2014 | Did not qualify | | | | | | | | | 8 | 1 | 1 | 6 | 8 | 30 |
| (Russia) 2018 | Disqualified due to FIFA suspension | | | | | | | | | Disqualified | | | | | |
| (Qatar) 2022 | Did not qualify | | | | | | | | | 8 | 0 | 1 | 7 | 5 | 27 |
| (Canada) (Mexico) (United States) 2026 | Did not qualify | | | | | | | | | 20 | 8 | 4 | 8 | 31 | 32 |
| (Morocco) (Portugal) (Spain) 2030 | To be determined | | | | | | | | | To be determined | | | | | |
| (Saudi Arabia) 2034 | To be determined | | | | | | | | | To be determined | | | | | |
| Total | Round of 16 | 15th | 1 | 0 | 0 | 1 | 0 | 6 | – | 99 | 27 | 21 | 51 | 123 | 202 |

=== By match ===
| World Cup | Round | Opponent | Score | Result | Venue | Scorers |
|---|---|---|---|---|---|---|
| 1938 | Round of 16 | Hungary | 0–6 | L | Reims | — |

=== Record by opponent ===
FIFA World Cup matches (by team)
| Opponent | Wins | Draws | Losses | Total | Goals Scored | Goals Conceded |
|---|---|---|---|---|---|---|
| Hungary | 0 | 0 | 1 | 1 | 0 | 6 |

== See also ==
- Asian nations at the FIFA World Cup
- Indonesia at the AFC Asian Cup
