= August 1914 =

Month in 1914

<<	August 1914					>>
Su	Mo	Tu	We	Th	Fr	Sa
						1
2	3	4	5	6	7	8
9	10	11	12	13	14	15
16	17	18	19	20	21	22
23	24	25	26	27	28	29
30	31

The following events occurred in August 1914:

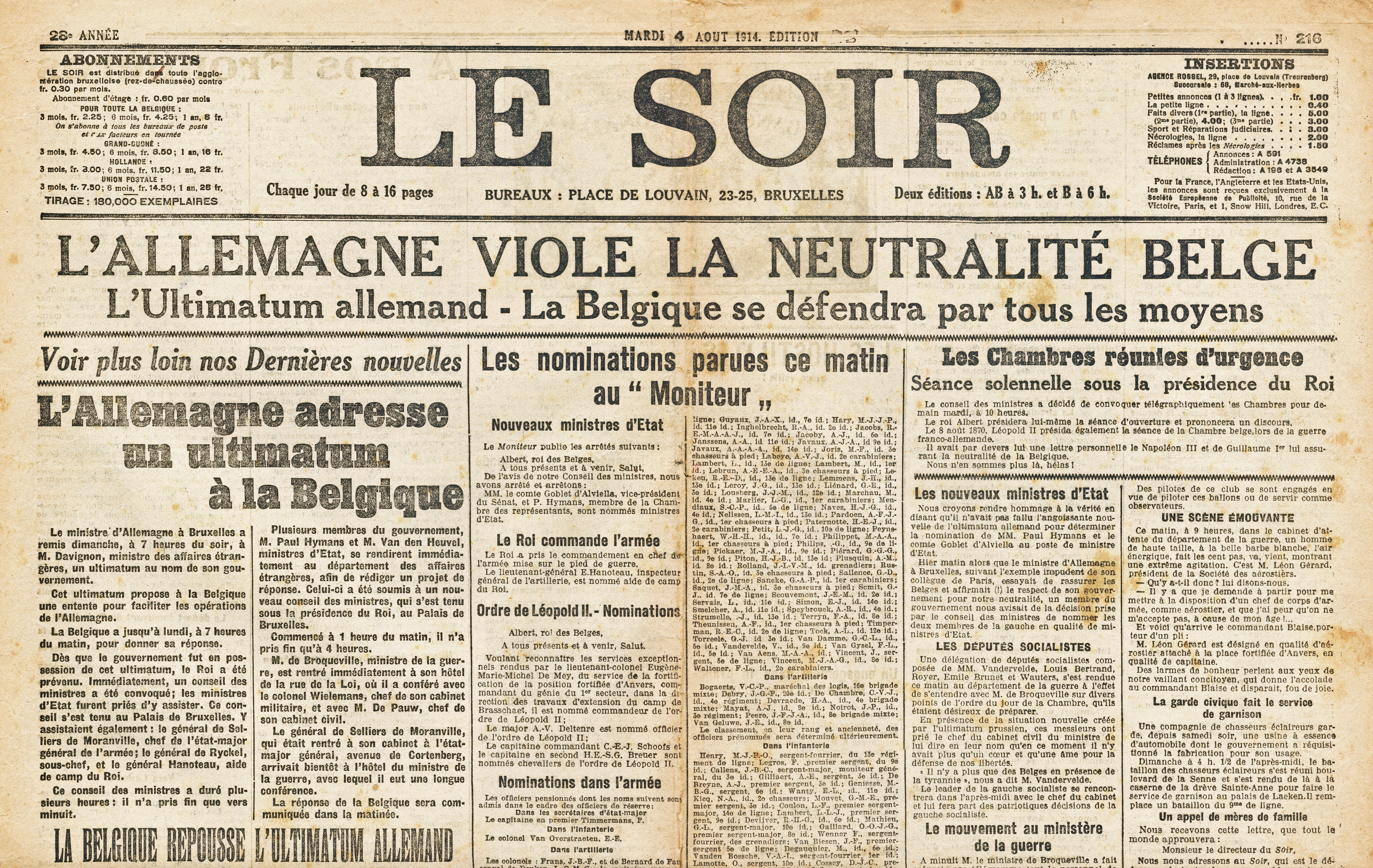
Headline from newspaper Le Soir, 4 August 1914, declaring Germany had violated Belgium's neutrality.

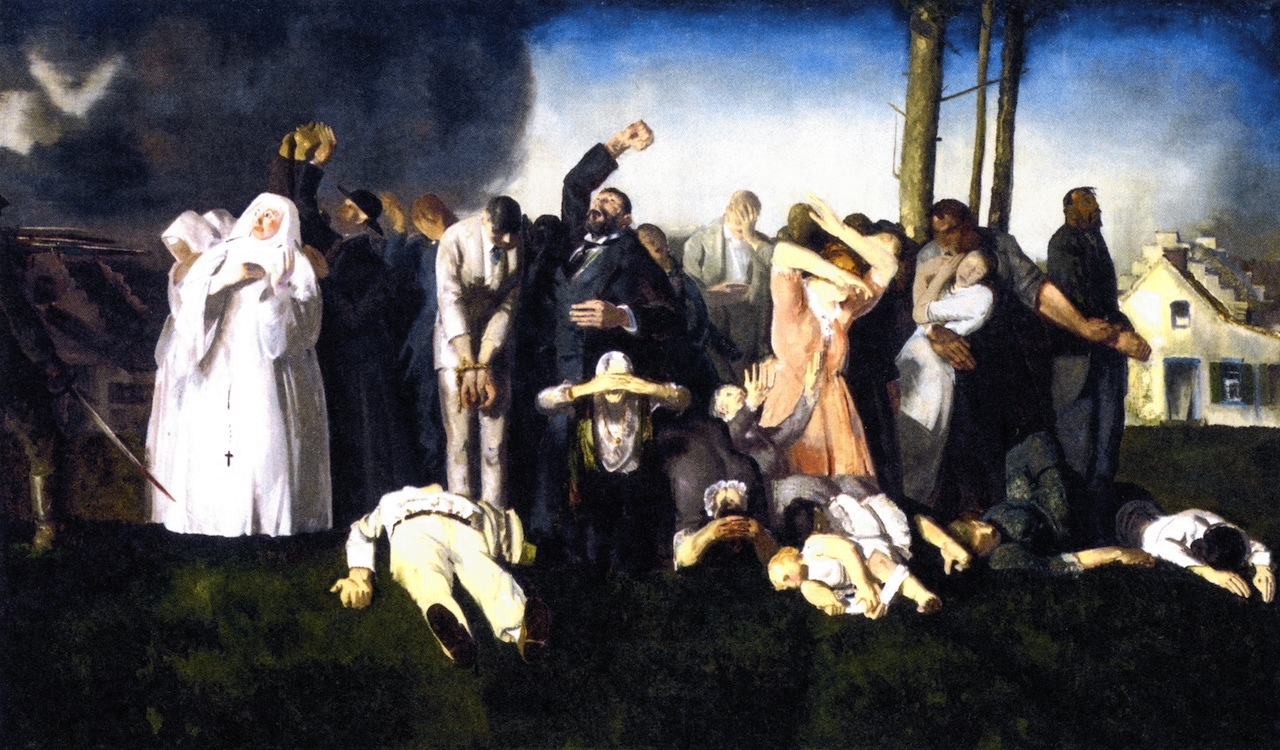
An imagined depiction of the massacre during the Battle of Dinant by the American artist George W. Bellows (1918)

== August 1, 1914 (Saturday) ==
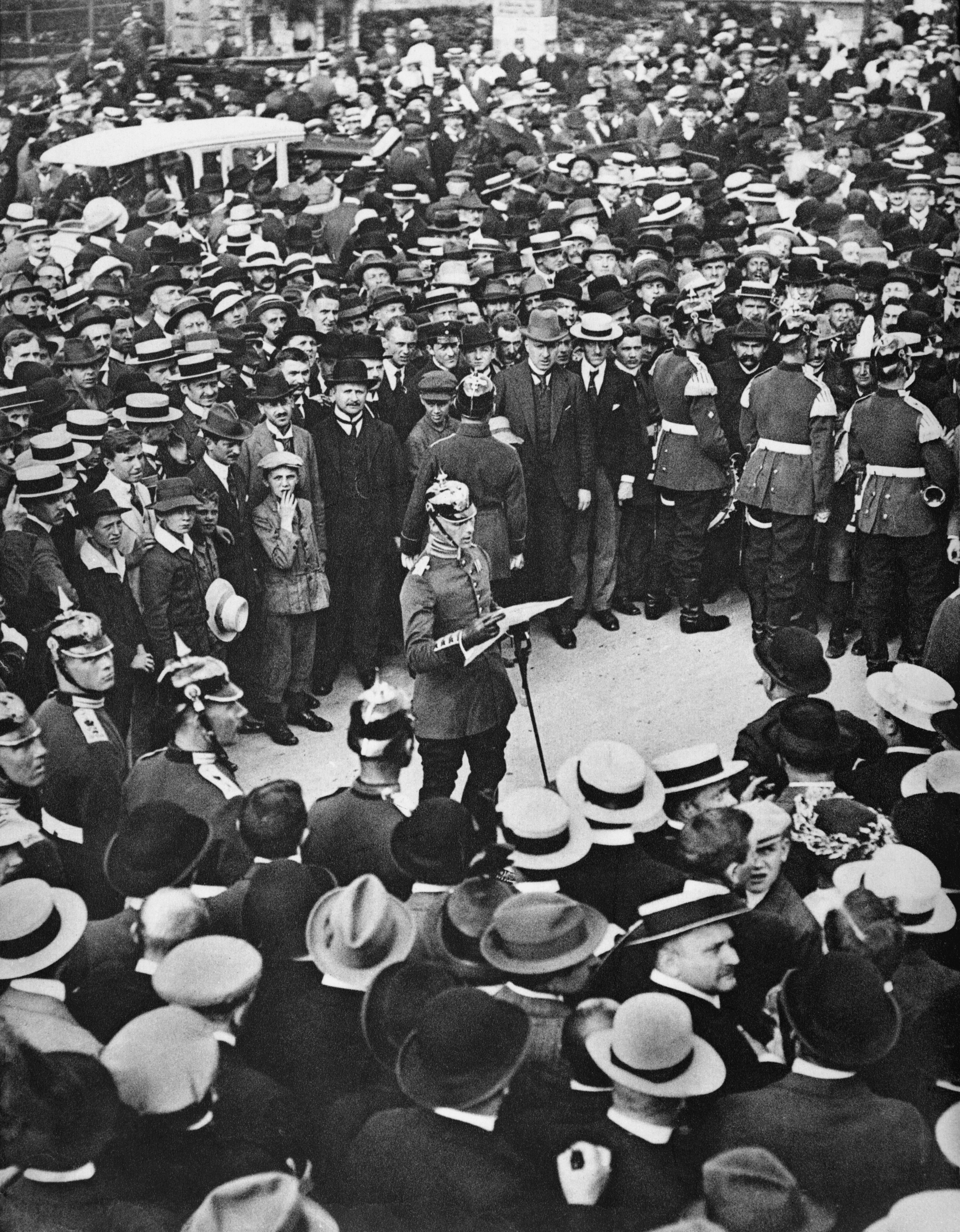
A Berlin crowd listens as a German officer reads Wilhelm II's order for mobilisation, 1 August 1914.

- The German Empire declared war on the Russian Empire, following Russia's full military mobilization in support of Serbia. The declaration of war also required Germany to begin mobilization.
- Italy declared itself neutral at the start of the war despite being part of the Triple Alliance, citing it was a defensive nature and Austria-Hungary's aggression did not obligate the country to take part.
- Germany accepted an offer from Great Britain to guarantee France's neutrality. However, Germany's plan to invade Luxembourg and Belgium forced France to mobilize, with the formation of the 1st, 2nd, 3rd, 4th, and 5th Armies.
- The New York Stock Exchange closed due to war in Europe, where nearly all stock exchanges were already closed.
- Pursuit of Goeben and Breslau – Commander of the Mediterranean Fleet, Admiral Archibald Berkeley Milne, assembled his force at Malta, and on the following day received instructions to shadow the German battlecruiser SMS Goeben. With the German ship already sighted, Milne ordered two British battleships to form a blockade at Gibraltar should the German ships try to escape into the Atlantic Ocean.
- Swiss National Park was established in the Engadin region of Switzerland.
- The Calcutta Scottish volunteer regiment for the British Indian Army was established.
- Marcus Garvey founded the Universal Negro Improvement Association in Jamaica.
- Eleven players from the Russian Empire, who participated in the interrupted Mannheim chess tournament, were interned in Rastatt, Germany, when war began. Four of the players were freed and allowed to return home via Switzerland in September, while two more were released in subsequent years.
- The rail line linking Zwiesel to Passau, Germany, officially opened, but with little fanfare due to the onset of World War I.
- The Western Sabah Railway Line opened new stations in Sabah, Malaysia including Beaufort, Bongawan, Halogilat, Kawang, Kimanis, Kinarut, Melalap, Membakut, Pangi, Papar, Putatan, Rayoh, Saliwangan, Secretariat, Tanah Merah, Tanjung Aru, and Tenom.
- The Brienz Rothorn Railway in Switzerland was shut down due to the outbreak of World War I and was not reopened until 1931.
- The Canadian Pacific Railway opened the Waterfront Station in Vancouver.
- The first issue of the weekly The Illustrated War News was published.
- The Charlie Chaplin comedy The Property Man became the first film to have a continuity error, in which Charlie Chaplin's character was seen losing a hat while carrying a trunk through a door on one side, only to have it reappear on the other side.
- The Alhambra Theatre opened in El Paso, Texas as both a live theater and movie house. It became part of the National Register of Historic Places in 1980.
- Born: Hughie Edwards, Australian air force officer and politician, 23rd Governor of Western Australia, commander of the No. 105 Squadron during World War II, recipient of the Victoria Cross for leading a daylight bombing raid on the port of Bremen, Germany; in Fremantle, Western Australia, Australia (d. 1982)
- Died: Gid Gardner, 55, American baseball player, played for eight different teams in three different leagues from 1879 to 1888 (b. 1859)

== August 2, 1914 (Sunday) ==
- A secret alliance was signed between Germany and the Ottoman Empire.
- German troops occupied Luxembourg in accordance with its Schlieffen Plan.
- At 7:00 pm (local time) Germany issued a 12-hour ultimatum to neutral Belgium to allow German passage into France.
- The first military action on the Western Front occurred as a skirmish at Joncherey in northeastern France near the border. A small German cavalry illegally crossing the border (no formal declaration of war had yet been made) clashed with local French militia, resulting in at least two fatalities including Jules-André Peugeot, the first French military casualty of the war, and Albert Mayer, the first German casualty of the war.
- The first German soldiers appeared in Kalisz, Poland, considered to be the oldest city in the country.
- German cruiser SMS Augsburg bombarded Libau (now called Liepaja). This city was then part of the Russian empire and is now in Latvia.
- A seven-man reconnaissance team for Austria-Hungary infiltrated Russian-held Poland to gather intelligence. All seven later became cavalry for the Polish Army following World War I, known as the Seven Lancers of Belina.
- The Imperial German Army for World War I was organized into nine armies.
- Along with assigning regular corps units established in the 19th century for the armies, the Imperial German Army established the following corps units:
  - Four independent cavalry corps to fight on the Western Front.
  - New reserve infantry units.
  - Fortress units for Strassburg.
  - The Landwehr Corps to serve the Eighth Army.
- The World's Fair in Lyon remained open despite the outbreak of World War I, although the German and Austrian pavilions were closed.
- The Scandinavian Monetary Union between Sweden, Norway, and Denmark ended with the outbreak of World War I.
- The Tōbu Sano rail line was extended in Tochigi Prefecture, Japan, with stations Sanoshi and Tajima serving the line.
- Dutch cyclist Cor Blekemolen won the World Track Cycling Championships in Ordrup, Denmark, near Copenhagen.
- The association football club Balmaseda was formed in Balmaseda, Spain.
- Born:
  - Fay Crocker, Uruguayan-American professional golfer, winner of 11 LPGA tournaments; in Montevideo, Uruguay (d. 1983)
  - Junji Kinoshita, Japanese playwright, noted for the Japanese translation of the plays by William Shakespeare; in Tokyo, Empire of Japan (present-day Japan) (d. 2006)
  - Beatrice Straight, American film and theater actress, recipient of the Academy Award for Best Supporting Actress in Network; in Old Westbury, New York, United States (d. 2001)

== August 3, 1914 (Monday) ==
- At 7:00 am (local time), King Albert of Belgium refused the German request to violate his country's neutrality, resulting in Germany declaring war on Belgium and on France.
- British Foreign Secretary Sir Edward Grey encouraged the House of Commons to support going to war with Germany should Germany invade Belgium. Later that evening, he made the famous observation to a friend while looking out a window in the Foreign Office as gas lamps in London streets were being lit at dusk: "The lamps are going out all over Europe; we shall not see them lit again in our lifetime."
- The German main force under command of Major Hermann Preusker arrived in Kalisz, Poland. By late evening, gun battles erupted in the city, with Preusker blaming local civilians for shooting at his troops. Twenty-one civilians and six German soldiers were killed.
- The Polish military unit First Cadre Company was established in Kraków, Poland.
- Winston Churchill, First Lord of the Admiralty ordered the confiscation of two Ottoman battleships under construction at Armstrong Whitworth in Newcastle upon Tyne, England. The ships were later commissioned for service to the Royal Navy as HMS Agincourt and HMS Erin.
- The German light cruiser SMS Emden captured the Russian steamer Ryazan and sent it to Tsingtao, China where it was converted into the auxiliary cruiser Cormoran.
- The Imperial German Navy leased the cargo-passenger ship Answald for conversion into Germany's first seaplane tender, SMS Answald, designated Flugzeugmutterschiff I (Airplane Mothership I).
- English language teacher Henry Hadley was shot in an altercation with a Prussian officer on a train at Gelsenkirchen in Germany, dying two days later shortly after the declaration of war and becoming the first civilian casualty of World War I.
- Born: Joseph M. Breitenbeck, American clergy, 8th Bishop of Grand Rapids, Michigan from 1969 to 1989; in Detroit, United States (d. 2005)
- Died: Louis Couturat, 46, French mathematician, philosopher, and linguist, known for the creation of the constructed language Ido (b. 1868)

== August 4, 1914 (Tuesday) ==
- Much of the general populace in Germany celebrated in what became known as the Spirit of 1914 after all political parties in the Reichstag voted unanimously to support Germany's entry into war.
- German invasion of Belgium: Imperial German Army forces under command of generals Alexander von Kluck and Karl von Bülow entered Belgium at 8:02 am (local time) after the 12-hour ultimatum expired, bringing the July Crisis to a climax and causing Britain's entry into World War I.
- British entry into World War I: King George V of the United Kingdom in London declared war on the German Empire at 11:00 p.m. (GMT) for violating Belgian neutrality (protected by the Treaty of London (1839)) and especially to defend France.
- With the United Kingdom formally at war, the Dominions of Australia, Canada, and New Zealand entered World War I as realms of the British Empire.
- The United States declared neutrality at the outbreak of World War I.
- An international conference of religious leaders organized by American industrialist Andrew Carnegie with the goal for world peace went ahead as scheduled at Lake Constance, Germany, despite the fact the host country was already invading Belgium. The conference led to the formation of the Church Peace Union with a focus on improved international relations following the end of World War I. In 1986, it was renamed the Carnegie Council for Ethics in International Affairs.
- The Canadian government passed the War Measures Act, which suspended some civil rights in Canada during a crisis.
- Violence escalated in Kalisz, Poland as occupying German forces started shelling the city and massacring civilians as part of a pogrom to crack down on perceived rebellion. More than 10,000 civilians fled the city the following day.
- Pursuit of Goeben and Breslau – Imperial German Navy cruisers Goeben and Breslau under command of Rear-Admiral Wilhelm Souchon bombarded the ports of Bône and Philippeville in French Algeria despite orders from Germany to head straight for Constantinople. The two British battlecruisers, Indomitable and Indefatigable, made contact with the German warships and tried to shadow them, but the swifter German boats outran them.
- Zaian War – The Zayanes took advantage of a weaker French military presence in Morocco as troops were relocated back to France to fight in World War I, launching a month-long siege on Khenifra, Morocco.
- Admiral Sir John Jellicoe was appointed Commander-in-Chief of Britain's newly designated Grand Fleet, based at Scapa Flow, which contained elements from the older First and Second Fleets.
- The British Royal Naval Air Service took inventory of its air fleet, which had only 26 out of 52 seaplanes that were serviceable for flight, with 46 more on order.
- The German ferry SMS Deutschland was commissioned as a mine layer for the Imperial German Navy for the Baltic Sea.
- The German Papiermark replaced the gold mark as the official currency of Germany for World War I.
- The British government took control of all the nation's railways as a wartime measure.
- The London Mounted Brigade of the British Army was established, including the units A Battery and B Battery.
- The 8th and 9th Cyclist Brigades of the British Army were disbanded.
- Mahatma Gandhi learned that war had been declared just as he reached London. Soon after, he began organizing the Indian Volunteer Corps to provide non-military support for the British Empire.
- The Order of the White Feather was established by retired Royal Navy Admiral Charles Cooper Penrose-Fitzgerald, in Folkestone, England, aiming to persuade women to offer white feathers to men not in uniform to shame them into enlisting.
- German Marxist leaders Karl Liebknecht, Rosa Luxemburg and Clara Zetkin co-founded with others the Spartacus League, named after the ancient Roman rebel leader, in Berlin.
- The Manchester Babies Hospital opened in Manchester, England.
- The Egyptian association football and sports club Al Ittihad Alexandria Club was formed in Alexandria.
- Died: Hubertine Auclert, 66, French activist, campaigner for women's suffrage in France (b. 1848)

== August 5, 1914 (Wednesday) ==
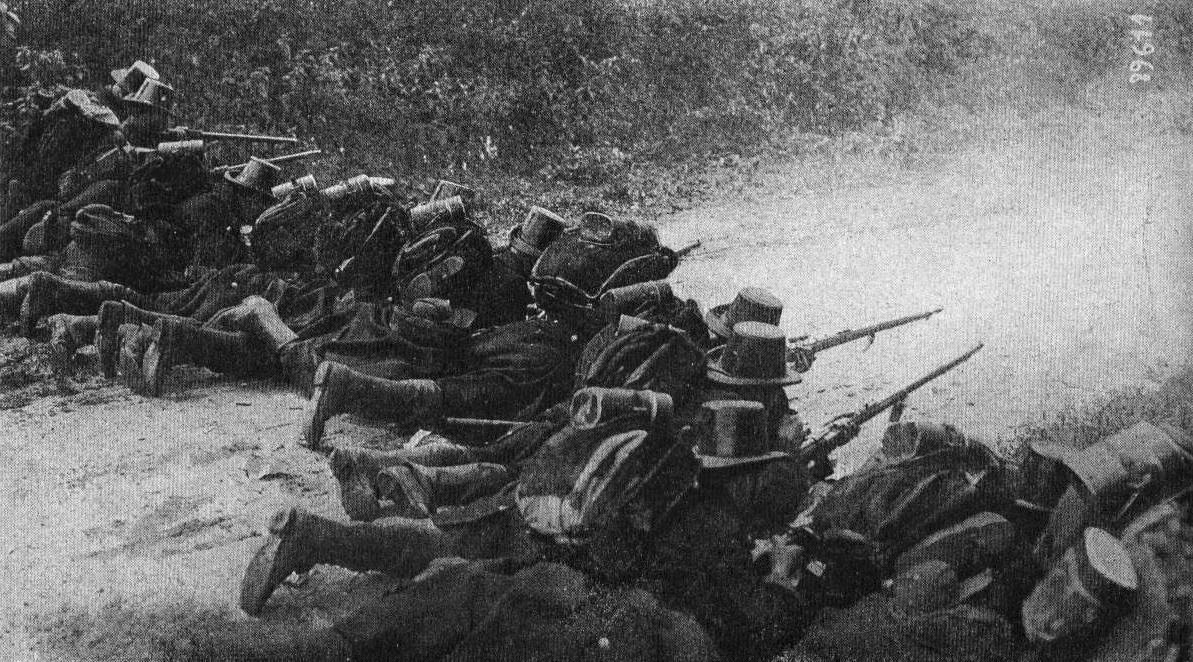
Belgian troops defending a Herstal suburb, just north-east of Liège.

- The Kingdom of Montenegro declared war on Austria-Hungary.
- Battle of Liège – German forces assaulted the city of Liège in east Belgium at 2:30 a.m., instigating the first major battle of World War I.
- The Bryan–Chamorro Treaty was signed between Nicaragua and the United States. The treaty guaranteed the Central American government's stability with U.S. military support, while ensuring the country did not compete against the Panama Canal with construction of its own water route.
- The guns of Point Nepean fort at Port Phillip, Victoria, Australia fired across the bow of the Norddeutscher Lloyd steamer SS Pfalz as it was attempting to leave the Port of Melbourne in ignorance of the declaration of war (the German ship was detained).
- A rail accident in Joplin, Missouri killed 39 people and injured 25 more.
- SS Königin Luise, taken over two days earlier by the Imperial German Navy as a minelayer, laid mines 40 miles (64 km) off the east coast of England. She was intercepted and sunk by the Royal Navy light cruiser HMS Amphion, the first German naval loss of the war.
- Canadian Arctic Expedition – Captain Robert Bartlett of the shipwrecked Karluk completed the first leg of his voyage to rescue the remaining survivors on Wrangel Island in the Bering Sea. He rendezvoused at Port Hope, Alaska to provide new clothing and wages owed to his Inuk guide and companion who traveled with him from Wrangel Island to Siberia in an attempt to get back to civilization and arrange a rescue boat.
- The German liner SS Prinz Eitel Friedrich was commissioned as an auxiliary cruiser for the Imperial German Navy while stationed in China.
- The Czechoslovak Legion was established to support the Allies on the Eastern Front.
- The British Army established Central Force to command First, Second and later Third Army Home Forces which protected domestic Great Britain until 1916 when they were reformed as the Northern Army.
- The 1st Mounted Division of the British Army was established.
- An arm of the British Red Cross was established in Australia in response to World War I. It eventually received its own charter in 1941 to become the Australian Red Cross.
- Kaiser Wilhelm reauthorized the Iron Cross, including the Grand Cross of the Iron Cross as one of the top military decorations in Germany.
- The first electric traffic light was installed on the corner of East 105th Street and Euclid Avenue in Cleveland.
- The American Women's War Relief Fund was established by American expatriates in Great Britain to support the World War I effort.
- Born: Parley Baer, American actor, known for character television roles including The Andy Griffith Show and The Adventures of Ozzie and Harriet; in Salt Lake City, United States (d. 2002)

== August 6, 1914 (Thursday) ==
- Austria-Hungary declared war on Russia. Serbia declared war on Germany.
- Pursuit of Goeben and Breslau – Italy refused to provide haven for the German ships under command of Rear-Admiral Wilhelm Souchon in any of their ports. Despite having insufficient coal to guarantee the ships would reach Constantinople, Souchon ordered his ships to make a run for the Turkish port, hoping the naval action would "force the Ottoman Empire, even against their will, to spread the war to the Black Sea against their ancient enemy, Russia."
- The first engagement between ships of the Royal Navy and the Imperial German Navy began when HMS Bristol pursued SMS Karlsruhe (which escaped) in the West Indies.
- The United States successfully negotiated a ceasefire that ended civil war in the Dominican Republic. Some 500 individuals were killed during the conflict.
- The Royal Navy light cruiser HMS Amphion struck mines laid by Königin Luise. (They were laid on 5th August before Konigen Luise was sunk by Amphion that day.) Some 150 British sailors were lost, the first British casualties of the war. Eighteen German crew members from the German minelayer had been lost.
- Battle of Liège – The first air attack on a major European city occurred when a German zeppelin dropped bombs on Liège, Belgium, killing nine civilians.
- The first airship lost in combat was the Imperial German Army Zeppelin Z VI. Badly damaged by artillery and infantry gunfire on her first combat mission while bombing Liège, Belgium, at low altitude, she limped back into Germany and was wrecked in a crash-landing in a forest near Bonn.
- Ellen Axson Wilson, First Lady of the United States, died from Bright's disease (chronic nephritis). It was said she relayed a last message to the White House physician allowing husband and U.S. President Woodrow Wilson to remarry. Her last words supposedly were "Take good care of my husband." She was buried in Rome, Georgia among her family. Woodrow remarried over a year later to Edith Bolling Galt.
- Royal Navy destroyer HMS Murray was launched by the Palmers Shipbuilding and Iron Company in Hebburn, England, to serve with the Harwich Force during World War I.
- The East Southsea railway station for the Southsea Railway closed in Portsmouth, England.
- Born: George Clifton Edwards Jr., American federal judge, served on the United States Court of Appeals for the Sixth Circuit from 1963 to 1995; in Dallas, United States (d. 1995)
- Died: Maxim Sandovich, 26, Polish clergy, Maxim of Gorlice in Galicia (now Poland (executed) (b. 1888)

== August 7, 1914 (Friday) ==
- The British Expeditionary Force arrived in France.
- Spanish Prime Minister Eduardo Dato declared through the Boletín Oficial del Estado, the official gazette of the Spanish monarchy, that Spain would remain neutral during the war.
- Battle of Mulhouse – France launched its first attack of the war in an ultimately unsuccessful attempt to recover the province of Alsace from Germany, beginning the Battle of the Frontiers.
- Pursuit of Goeben and Breslau – Unable to match the speed of the German ships or equal their firepower, British cruisers under command of Rear Admiral Ernest Troubridge called off pursuit in the Adriatic Sea.
- Relief forces from Germany relieved soldiers under Major Hermann Preusker in Kalisz, Poland but high tensions and panic caused more than 100 civilian deaths. German soldiers began a pogrom by burning private buildings, starting with City Hall. The following day, some 800 civilians were rounded up and 80 were executed.
- Togoland Campaign – British colonial troops of the Gold Coast Regiment entered the German West African colony of Togoland and encountered a German-led police force at a factory in Nuatja, near Lomé, where the police opened fire on the patrol. Alhaji Grunshi returned fire, becoming the first soldier in British service to fire a shot in the war.
- The Australian passenger ship HMAS Grantala was acquired by the Royal Australian Navy as a hospital ship.
- The Otago Infantry Regiment of the New Zealand Expeditionary Force was established.
- The Royal Navy dissolved the 9th Battle Squadron due to the age of the battleships.
- The Currency and Bank Notes Act in Great Britain gave wartime powers of banknote issue to the Treasury; the first notes, with the signature of Treasury Secretary John Bradbury, were issued.
- Giard, founded in 1871, was re-incorporated as a town in Clayton County, Iowa and operated until 1925.
- Born:
  - Nat Fein, American news photographer, photographer for The New York Times who received the Pulitzer for his shot of Babe Ruth at the end of his life, known as Babe Ruth Bows Out; as Nathaniel Fein, in New York City, United States (d. 2000)
  - Ted Moore, South African-British cinematographer, best known for his work on the James Bond films in the 1960s and early 1970s, recipient of the Academy Award for Best Cinematography for A Man for All Seasons; in Western Cape, South Africa (d. 1987)

== August 8, 1914 (Saturday) ==
- The Kingdom of Montenegro declared war on Germany.
- Battle of Mulhouse – French forces entered Mulhouse on the Alsace region and held the city for two days before Germany counter-attacked.
- Great Britain passed the first Defence of the Realm Act.
- Pursuit of Goeben and Breslau – Admiral Archibald Berkeley Milne received conflicting reports from Great Britain about engagement in the Mediterranean Sea. He opted to have his ships guard the Adriatic Sea, giving the German warships valuable time to refuel in the Greek Islands.
- Togoland Campaign – British and French soldiers officially prepared to take Lomé, the capital of the German colony of Togoland in West Africa, only to learn Germany allowed the colony government to give up the city in order to prevent it from being hit by a naval bombardment. The British officially occupied the city the following day.
- The 7th Battle Squadron of the Royal Navy was absorbed into the 8th Battle Squadron.
- German colonial forces executed Cameroonian resistance leaders Martin-Paul Samba and Rudolf Duala Manga Bell for treason.
- Sir Ernest Shackleton's Imperial Trans-Antarctic Expedition set sail on the Endurance from England in an attempt to cross Antarctica.
- The Luxembourg Red Cross was established.
- The Albert Road Bridge and Jessie Road Bridge railway stations on the Southsea Railway closed in Portsmouth, England.
- The 13th International Lawn Tennis Challenge, now known as the Davis Cup, wrapped with the final played between Great Britain and Australasia at the Longwood Cricket Club in Brookline, Massachusetts. Australasia was victorious over Britain, with a final score of 3–2.
- The Fidalgo Madureira Atlético Clube was formed in Rio de Janeiro. Business owners would change the name to Madureira Atlético Clube in 1933. In 1971, the club merged with two others and became known by its present name Madureira.
- The German socialist newspaper Unity and its counterpart Pioneer were banned by authorities.
- Born:
  - Hazel Walker, American amateur basketball player, inductee to the Women's Basketball Hall of Fame; in Ashdown, Arkansas, United States (d. 1990)
  - William Thornton Mustard, Canadian physician and surgeon, first to perform experimental open-heart surgery on an animal patient; in Clinton, Ontario, Canada (d. 1987)
  - Dawee Chullasapya, Thai air force officer and politician, Chief of Defence Forces in the 1970s; in Thonburi, Siam (present-day Thailand) (d. 1996)
  - Unity Mitford, British socialite, noted supporter of Nazism in the United Kingdom; in London, England (d. 1948)
- Died: John Schuyler Crosby, 74, American military officer and politician, 5th Governor of Montana Territory (b. 1839)

== August 9, 1914 (Sunday) ==
- Mexican Revolution – Leaders of the Constitutional Army met with Mexican president Francisco S. Carvajal and negotiated a safe passage of all federal troops and senior government leaders out of Mexico City in exchange for unconditional surrender. Carvajal agreed to the terms and ordered the federal army to evacuate from Mexico City the following day.
- Royal Navy light cruiser HMS Birmingham rammed and sank German submarine U-15 off Fair Isle, the first U-boat lost in action.
- Pursuit of Goeben and Breslau – The British ships received definitive orders to pursue German warships SMS Goeben and Breslau as they attempted to race across the Aegean Sea to the Dardanelles, which would provide safe passage to Constantinople.
- Conducting a reconnaissance mission, the French dirigible (airship) Fleurus became the first Allied aircraft to fly over Germany during World War I.
- Archbishop of Brisbane James Duhig dedicated the opening of St Brigid's Church in Brisbane. It was added to the Queensland Heritage Register in 1992.
- Born:
  - William Alexander Hewitt, American business executive, last member of the Deere family to manage the John Deere company; in San Francisco, United States (d. 1998)
  - Albert O. Vorse Jr., American marine air force officer, commander of the VF-80 squadron during World War II, two-time recipient of the Distinguished Flying Cross, Navy Cross and Silver Star; in Philadelphia, United States (d. 1979)
  - Tove Jansson, Finnish children's author and illustrator, best known for her Moomins book series for children; in Helsinki, Finland (d. 2001)
  - Joe Mercer, British association football manager, coached Manchester City from 1965 to 1971; as Joseph Mercer, in Ellesmere Port, England (d. 1990)
- Died: Roque Sáenz Peña, 63, Argentine state leader, 17th President of Argentina (b. 1851)

== August 10, 1914 (Monday) ==
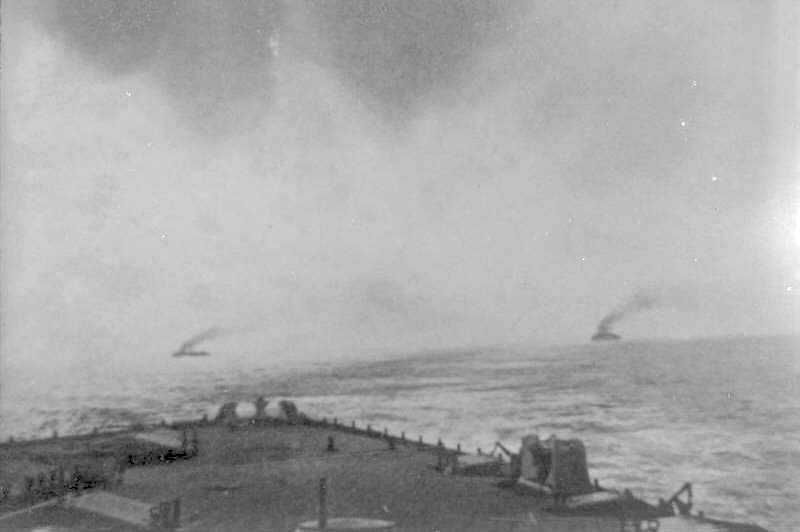
British ships seen in pursuit of German ships SMS Goeben and SMS Breslau.

- Battle of Mulhouse – Soldiers from the German Seventh Army recaptured Mulhouse, forcing French troops to retreat to nearby Belfort, France.
- The Ottoman Empire opened the Dardanelles to allow German cruisers SMS Goeben and SMS Breslau passage to Constantinople, despite being required under international law, as a neutral party, to block military shipping.
- All suffragette prisoners in Great Britain were released unconditionally.
- The 7th Australian Battalion was established.
- The Princess Patricia's Canadian Light Infantry of the Canadian Army was established.
- The adventure-drama The Call of the North opened at the box office, starring Robert Edeson and directed by Oscar Apfel and Cecil B. DeMille. Based on the play by George Broadhurst, that film was remade in 1921.
- The Seychelles nation received its own rupee currency.
- Born:
  - Ken Annakin, British film director, known for adventure films including Swiss Family Robinson and Those Magnificent Men in their Flying Machines; as Kenneth Annakin, in Beverley, England (d. 2009)
  - Lee Tai-young, Korean lawyer, first woman to practice law and sit as a judge in Korea; in Unsan County, Empire of Japan (present-day North Korea) (d. 1998)
- Died: John Butler Smith, 76, American politician, 44th Governor of New Hampshire (b. 1838)

== August 11, 1914 (Tuesday) ==
- Mexican Revolution – Mexican revolutionary leader Álvaro Obregón signed one of the documents related to the Teoloyucan Treaties, legendarily on the mudguard of a car, which would dissolve the current Mexican regime and allow leaders of the Constitutional Army to set up a new government.
- The British packet ship HMS Empress was acquired and commissioned by the Royal Navy as a seaplane carrier.
- The 4th Australian Light Horse Regiment was established.
- The Boston Braves played their final game at the South End Grounds before moving on to play at Fenway Park in Boston. The baseball field was later demolished.
- The city of Corcoran, California was incorporated.
- Born:
  - Hugh Martin, American composer, best known for his scores of Meet Me in St. Louis including "The Boy Next Door", "The Trolley Song", and "Have Yourself a Merry Little Christmas"; in Birmingham, Alabama, United States (d. 2011)
  - John J. Wild, British-American physician, one of the first group to use ultrasound for body imaging, including detecting cancers; in Kent, England (d. 2009)
- Died: Pol Plançon, 63, French opera singer, best known for his collaborations with the Metropolitan Opera (b. 1851)

== August 12, 1914 (Wednesday) ==
- Great Britain and France declared war on Austria-Hungary.
- Mexican Revolution – Mexican president Francisco Carvajal formally left Mexico City for Veracruz, allowing the Constitutional Army to enter the city.
- Battle of Halen – Belgian troops under command of Lieutenant-General Léon de Witte de Haelen repulsed a German cavalry under command of Georg von der Marwitz in what was the second phase of the Battle of the Frontiers, though the battle did little to delay the German invasion of Belgium.
- Karl von Müller, commander of the German light cruiser SMS Emden, met with Imperial German Navy Admiral Maximilian von Spee at Pagan, one of the Mariana Islands in the north Pacific Ocean to discuss naval strategy. Spee learned Japan was siding with the Allies and that the Japanese fleet had been ordered to track the German squadron down. The two naval officers agreed to have the Emden stay behind in the eastern Pacific as an independent raider while the bulk of the German Pacific squadron led the Japanese fleet away towards South America.
- German submarine SM U-13 was lost in the Heligoland Bight with the loss of all 25 crew.
- Lieutenant Robin R. Skene and mechanic R. Barlow crashed their Blériot monoplane on the way to Dover, becoming the first members of the Royal Flying Corps to die on active duty.
- The Intelligence Corps of the British Army was established.
- The city of General Alvear, Mendoza, Argentina was incorporated, named after General Carlos María de Alvear.
- Died: John Philip Holland, 73, Irish engineer, developed the first Royal Navy submarine (b. 1840)

== August 13, 1914 (Thursday) ==
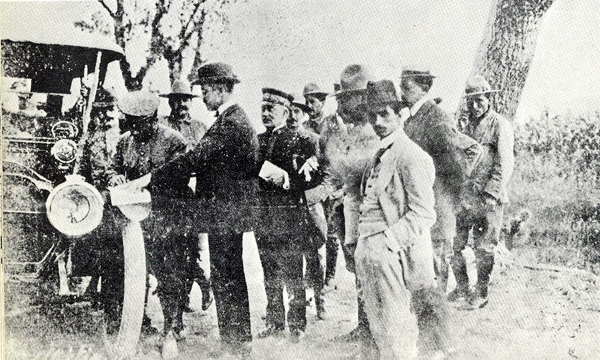
Signature of the Teoloyucan Treaties in Mexico City.

- Mexican Revolution – The Teoloyucan Treaties were officially signed in Mexico City. Interim president Francisco S. Carvajal officially resigned from office to make way for the inauguration of Venustiano Carranza.
- Austro-Hungarian troopship SMS Baron Gautsch struck a mine laid by their own navy in the Adriatic Sea, killing 147 men. Another 150 survivors were rescued by nearby destroyers.
- Twelve Royal Aircraft Factory B.E.2 observation aircraft from No. 2 Squadron, Royal Flying Corps, flying from Dover, became the first British aircraft to arrive in France for the war.
- Kamerun campaign – Captain Ernst von Raben, commander of the German colonial garrison in Mora, German Cameroon, relocated the fort from the plain to a mountain outpost and increased in troop strength from 125 to 200 troops to defend against Allied invasion into German-held African colony.
- The Army Printing and Stationery Service was established to handle all the official publications of the British Expeditionary Force.
- The Gazette van Detroit was formed as a Flemish-language newspaper for Dutch-speaking immigrants in Roseville, Michigan. It folded in 2018.

== August 14, 1914 (Friday) ==
- Battle of Lorraine – The third phase of the Battle of the Frontiers began when the French First Army advanced on German forces near Sarrebourg, Lorraine, France.
- Rebel forces tried to capture Durrës, the capital of Albania, but were driven back by defending Romanian volunteer forces.
- The German light cruiser SMS Emden left the rest of the Imperial German Navy Pacific squadron and set course to cruise the major shipping lanes between Singapore, Colombo and Aden.
- The 9th Scottish Division was activated to serve as part of the British Expeditionary Force.
- The Circuit of Britain race scheduled to start from Calshot, England, was cancelled due to the outbreak of war, grounding prototype airplanes from Blackburn, Grahame-White, and White and Thompson No. 3 and No. 1 seaplane models (although they would be used as military aircraft later).
- The first true bomber, the French Voisin III, was used in combat for the first time in an attack on German airship hangars at Metz-Frescaty Air Base in Germany.
- "August Agreement" gave the Bank of England an effective monopoly over South Africa's gold output.
- The Carnegie Colored Library was established in Savannah, Georgia, thanks to public donations from Andrew Carnegie, to provide a public library for African-American children that were barred from the other public library in town under the state's segregation laws.
- The Portimonense was formed in Portimão, Portugal as an association football club, but since expanded to include basketball in its rosters.
- The 12 de Octubre Football Club was formed in Itauguá, Paraguay. Near its centennial, the association football club was promoted to the Paraguayan Primera División.
- The song "They Didn't Believe Me"—composed by Jerome Kern with lyrics by Herbert Reynolds—was added to the musical The Girl from Utah when it debuted at the Knickerbocker Theatre on Broadway in New York City and became a musical standard for most of the first half of the 20th century.
- The Broadway comedy Twin Beds debuted at the Fulton Theatre in New York City and ran for 411 performances.
- Born:
  - Poul Hartling, Danish state leader, 22nd Prime Minister of Denmark; in Copenhagen, Denmark (d. 2000)
  - Albert Spaulding, American anthropologist, noted for promoting statistics as part of anthropological and archaeological studies; in Chouteau County, Montana, United States (d. 1990)
  - Alija Sirotanović, Bosnian miner, credited a model of the industrial worker in Yugoslavia, recipient of the Order of the Hero of Socialist Labour, in Orahovo, Breza, Austria-Hungary (present-day Bosnia and Herzegovina) (d. 1990)

== August 15, 1914 (Saturday) ==
- The Nippō rail line was extended in Kyushu, Japan, with station Yamanokuchi serving the line.
- Victoria defeated South Australia to win the third edition of the Australian National Football Carnival in Sydney, going virtually undefeated through the entire football championship.
- The 8th New Zealand rugby tour of Australia wrapped with New Zealand winning the series with three victories.
- Australia recruited an offering of 20,000 troops for the First Australian Imperial Force to fight in World War I, including the establishment of the 1st Division, composed of the 1st, 2nd, 3rd, 4th, 5th, 6th, 7th, 8th, 9th, 10th, 11th, and 12th. Later the 13th, 14th, 15th, and 16th Battalions would form a 4th Brigade.
- The Australian Voluntary Hospital was formed, with volunteer Australian expatriates providing medical services to the Western Front throughout World War I.
- Battle of Cer – Serbian troops clashed with the invading Austro-Hungarian army on Cer Mountain in western Serbia, marking the first Allied victory of World War I.
- Battle of Dinant – German troops captured the Citadel of Dinant in Dinant, Belgium.
- Battle of Lorraine – German artillery and dug-in infantry bombarded French forces undisturbed and inflicted major casualties.
- Battle of Agbeluvhoe – Over 2,000 soldiers with the British Royal West African Frontier Force clashed with 1,500 German soldiers on their way to capture Chra, the last remaining defensive city in Togoland, resulting in a British victory.
- The Scottish Horse Mounted Brigade of the British Army was established.
- The Fairport Lift Bridge opened to traffic to cross over the Erie Canal in Fairport, New York.
- The Panama Canal was inaugurated with the passage of the SS Ancon.
- Mexican Revolution – Venustiano Carranza's troops under general Álvaro Obregón entered Mexico City.
- Dismissed servant Julian Carlton killed seven people at American architect Frank Lloyd Wright's studio and home, Taliesin in Wisconsin (including Wright's mistress, Mamah Borthwick), and set it on fire.
- American explorer and mountaineer Dora Keen led a four-person expedition to explore the glaciers in Prince William Sound, Alaska, and became one of the first to explore the Harvard Glacier.
- Born: Paul Rand, American graphic designer, best known for designing logos for IBM, UPS, Enron, Morningstar, Inc., Westinghouse Electric, American Broadcasting Company and Steve Jobs' NeXT; as Peretz Rosenbaum, in New York City, United States (d. 1996)

== August 16, 1914 (Sunday) ==
- Battle of Liège – The Germans captured the last of the military forts in the Belgium city. The siege lasted 11 days as opposed to the two days the Germans planned for, delaying their advance just enough for British and French forces to organize.
- Battle of Cer – Serbian forces pushed the Austro-Hungarians off the slopes of Cer Mountain in western Serbia.
- Battle of Dinant – The French Fifth Army fortified on the west bank of the Meuse River near Dinant to hold back the German Third Army on the east bank.
- The Austrian-Hungarian battle cruiser SMS Zenta was sunk by Allied ships at the Battle of Antivari in the Adriatic Sea with the loss of 173 sailors.
- German warships SMS Goeben and Breslau were transferred to the Ottoman Navy, with Goeben becoming its flagship, Yavuz Sultan Selim and Breslau becoming Midilli.
- Second Lieutenant Evelyn Perry of the Royal Flying Corps died in a plane crash while flying over France, becoming one of the first British officers to die in World War I.
- Irish Member of Parliament John Redmond addressed over 2,000 Irish Volunteers in Maryborough, Ireland, saying "for the first time in the history ... it was safe to-day for England to withdraw her armed troops from our country and that the sons of Ireland themselves ... [would] defend her shores against any foreign foe."
- The Kyŏngwŏn rail line opened in Gyeonggi Province, Korea between Seoul and Wonsan, with stations Anbyon, Kosan, Pyonggang, Sep'o and Wonsan serving the line.
- The Temporary Commission of Confederated Independence Parties, a loose organization of political parties advocating for Polish independence from Austria-Hungary, was reformed at the Supreme National Committee.
- Born:
  - Harold Milford, British air force officer, member of the No. 226 Squadron and the escape team from the German prisoner of war camp Stalag Luft III during World War II; in Streatham, London, England (executed, 1944)
  - John Naka, American artist, known for his bonsai work including Goshin; in Fort Lupton, Colorado, United States (d. 2004)

== August 17, 1914 (Monday) ==
- The first feature film produced in New Zealand, Hinemoa debuted at the Lyric Theatre in Auckland. Directed by George Tarr and featuring Māori actors, the film tells the Māori legend of lovers Hinemoa and Tutanekai.
- The 3rd Australian Light Horse Regiment was established.
- The Imperial Japanese Navy's first aviation ship, Wakamiya, was recommissioned as a seaplane tender.
- Battle of Stallupönen – The Russian First Army under General Paul von Rennenkampf invaded East Prussia. The German First Corps under command of General Hermann von François went against orders and committed a frontal assault on Russian forces near Stallupönen even though their forces were vastly outnumbered. The bold assault forced the Russians to retreat, with over 7,000 casualties, including nearly 5,000 prisoners. The Germans sustained around 1,300 casualties and continued to pursue the retreating army until Russian artillery forced them back.
- Battle of Lorraine – After being delayed by German long-range artillery fire the day before, the French First Army reinforced the advancing line and took Sarrebourg.
- Wibaux County, Montana was established with its county seat in Wibaux.
- Born:
  - Bill Downs, American journalist, member of CBS News from 1942 to 1962, member of the Murrow Boys; as William Downs, in Kansas City, Kansas, United States (d. 1978)
  - Franklin Delano Roosevelt Jr., American lawyer and politician, son of Franklin D. Roosevelt, on Campobello Island, New Brunswick (d. 1988)
- Died: James Grierson, 55, British army officer, chief British military commander in the Anglo-Egyptian War, the Boxer Rebellion and the Second Boer War (b. 1859)

== August 18, 1914 (Tuesday) ==
- Battle of Mulhouse – The newly formed Army of Alsace under command of General Paul Pau mounted a second invasion into the Alsace region. The army captured key bridges on the Rhine as well as thousands of German soldiers and 24 pieces of artillery.
- The Ersatz Corps for the German 6th Army was established, including the 4th, 8th, 10th, and 19th Ersatz Divisions.
- The 1st Light Horse Brigade of the First Australian Imperial Force was established, with 2nd Light Horse Regiment in support.
- The Welsh Horse Yeomanry of the British Army was established in Cardiff.
- The Royal Navy established its own Signal Division.

== August 19, 1914 (Wednesday) ==
- The Ottoman Empire and Bulgaria signed an alliance.
- U.S. President Woodrow Wilson addressed United States Congress and called for strict neutrality during World War I: "Such divisions amongst us would be fatal to our peace of mind and might seriously stand in the way of the proper performance of our duty as the one great nation at peace, the one people holding itself ready to play a part of impartial mediation and speak the counsels of peace and accommodation, not as a partisan, but as a friend."
- The Australian Naval and Military Expeditionary Force left Sydney with 1,500 men on the newly commissioned HMAS Berrima to capture German New Guinea.
- The Southwestern Front of the Imperial Russian Army was established.
- Kamerun campaign – Captain Ernst von Raben, commander of the German colonial garrison in Mora, surprised a British column of 50 men from Maiduguri, Nigeria with a crack force of 30 troops, driving them away from the fort.
- Zaian War – French forces launched a series of counterattacks on the Zayanes around Khenifra, Morocco over three days, inflicting considerable losses and forcing the weeks-long siege to begin winding down.
- U.S. Navy destroyer Nicholson was launched from the William Cramp & Sons shipyard in Philadelphia.
- The village of Cereal, Alberta was established.
- Born:
  - Fumio Hayasaka, Japanese composer, best known for his film scores for film director Akira Kurosawa including Stray Dog, Rashomon, Ikiru and Seven Samurai; in Sendai, Empire of Japan (present-day Japan) (d. 1955)
  - Margaret Morgan Lawrence, American psychologist, best known for inner-city child development programs at Harlem Hospital Center; as Margaret Morgan, in New York City, United States (d. 2019)
  - Athol Shmith, Australian photographer, best known for promoting the "New Look" style of photography; as Louis Athol Shmith, in Melbourne, Australia (d. 1990)

== August 20, 1914 (Thursday) ==
- German forces occupied Brussels. The Siege of Namur began the same day.
- Mexican Revolution – Venustiano Carranza and his supporters entered Mexico City to set up a new Mexican government, backed by Álvaro Obregón. An estimated 150,000 city residents lined the streets to view the Carranza procession as it headed to the Presidential Palace.
- Pope Pius X died at 1:20 a.m. with his last words reported to be "Together in one: all things in Christ", referencing the motto he used in his 1903 encyclical shortly after he was elevated to Pontificate of the Catholic Church. His body was immediately lain in state at St. Peter's Basilica.
- Battle of Lorraine – The battles of Sarrebourg and Morhange began when German forces counter-attacked, forcing several separate battles against the French armies. French forces retreated in disorder but Germany was slow to pursue, allowing France to regroup.
- Battle of Gumbinnen – Trying to capitalize on his successful attack on the Russians three days earlier, General Hermann von François persuaded his commanding officer Maximilian von Prittwitz to launch a major offensive against the Russian First Army. Despite initial successful advances with infantry, German forces were forced back by Russian artillery. The Russian army counterattacked and captured 6,000 German soldiers. Faced with already 14,000 in casualties, Prittwitz panicked and ordered a general retreat, leaving East Prussia in the hands of the Russians.
- Kamerun campaign – Captain R. W. Fox, commander of British colonial forces in Maiduguri, Nigeria, was ordered to send forces to occupy Sava, three kilometres from Mora, German Cameroon.
- Forty British and American labourers were killed after a concrete building for a new custom house suddenly collapsed in La Ceiba, Honduras.
- The Moroccan Division of the French Army was established and would become the most decorated French unit in World War I.
- The Central Committee on Women's Employment was established to develop employment opportunities for women and support growing labor demands in Great Britain during World War I.
- The religious congregation Society of Saint Paul was founded in Alba, Piedmont, Italy by Friar Giacomo Alberione. It was officially approved by the Holy See in 1949.
- Died: Franz Xavier Wernz, 71, German Jesuit priest, 25th Superior General of the Society of Jesus (b. 1842)

== August 21, 1914 (Friday) ==
- The fourth phase of the Battle of the Frontiers began with the French army clashing with German forces at the Battle of the Ardennes on the border of Luxembourg and the Battle of Charleroi on the Sambre river in Belgium.
- Battle of Dinant – German forces launched a disorganized night attack on Dinant, Belgium, that mistakenly led them to believe the city was full of hostile civilians.
- Rebel forces captured the port city of Vlorë, Albania without resistance.
- Two Imperial Germany Army Zeppelins on their first combat missions became the second and third airships lost in combat after being damaged by French infantry and artillery fire during low-altitude missions in the Vosges mountains. Z VII limped back into Germany to crash near St. Quirin in Lorraine, while Z VIII crash-landed in a forest near Badonviller, France, where French cavalry drove off her crew and looted her. The loss of three airships on their first combat missions in August soured the German Army on the further combat use of airships.
- German colonial forces captured the colonial capital of Laï from the French in what is now Chad.
- Reconnaissance cyclist Private John Parr was the first British soldier to be killed on the Western Front, at Obourg in Belgium.
- Canadian Arctic Expedition – Captain Robert Bartlett of the sunken Karluk met Burt McConnell, secretary for expedition leader Vilhjalmur Stefansson, at Point Barrow, Alaska, who gave details of Stefansson's movements after leaving the ship the previous September when it was trapped in ice. McConnell reported in April that Stefansson had headed north with two companions, searching for new lands. McConnell later left Point Barrow for Nome aboard the American fishing schooner King and Winge while Bartlett's rescue ship, the Bear, finally sailed for Wrangel Island.
- The 10th, 11th, 12th, and 13th Divisions were formed as part of Kitchener's Army and would play major roles in the Gallipoli campaign the following year.
- The Imperial German Army established the 1st Bavarian Landwehr Division.
- The Royal Automobile Club Volunteer Force was established at the Port of Southampton as the chauffeur service for the senior officers of the British Army.
- Twenty-one-year-old golfer Walter Hagen won the 20th U.S. Open by a single stroke over Chick Evans in what would be the first of two U.S. Open titles.
- A total solar eclipse occurred that was visible in Northern Europe and most of Asia. It was also the first of four total solar eclipses that would be seen from Sweden during the next 40 years.
- Born: Doug Wright, English cricketer, bowler for the England cricket team and Kent County Cricket Club from 1932 to 1957; as Douglas Wright, in Sidcup, England (d. 1998)
- Died: Charles J. Hite, 38, American film producer, president and CEO of Thanhouser Film Corporation in New York City (killed in an auto accident) (b. 1876)

== August 22, 1914 (Saturday) ==
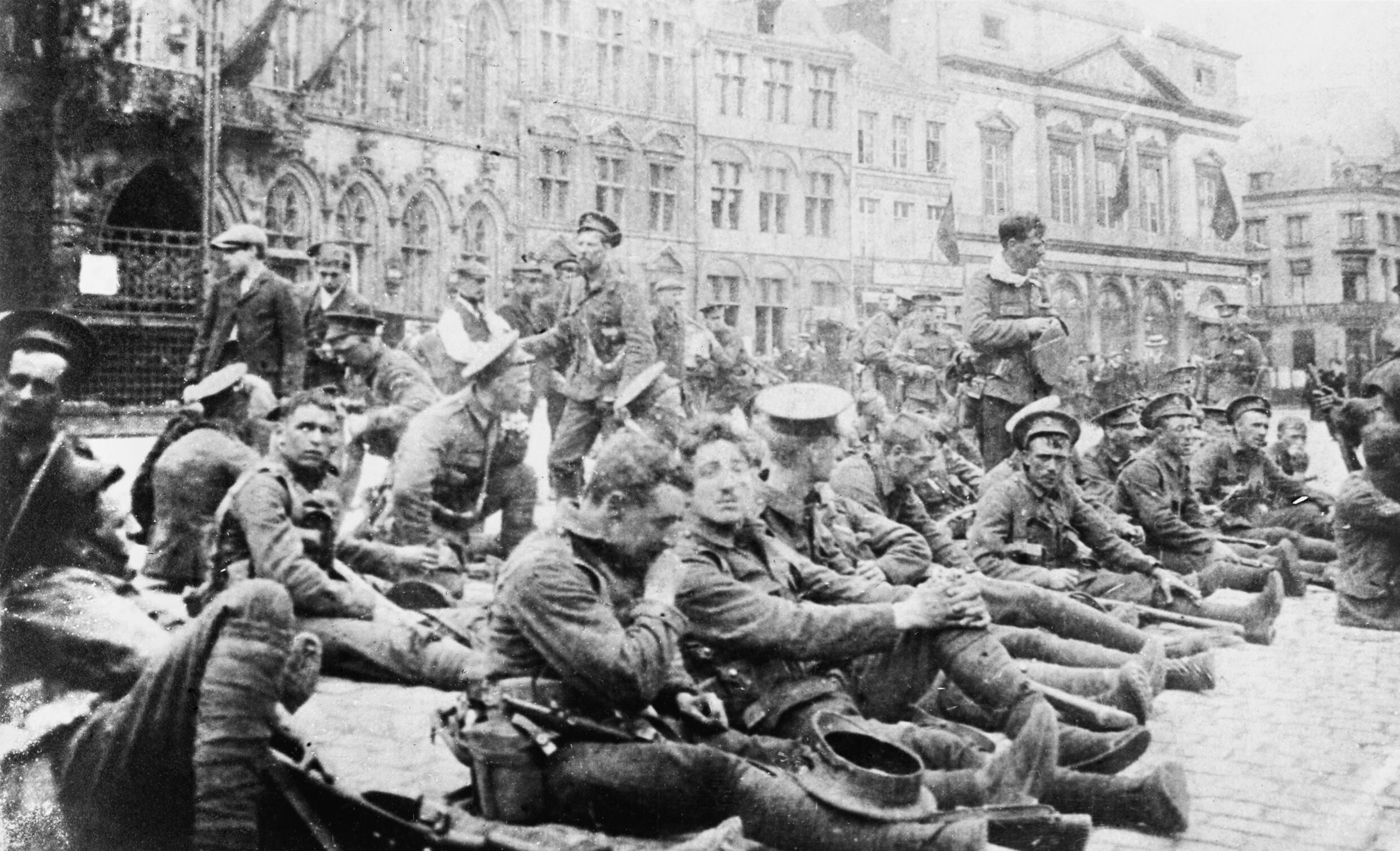
British soldiers resting in the town square at Mons before entering the fighting line at the Battle of Mons.

- Austria-Hungary declared war on Belgium.
- Polish military leader Józef Piłsudski formed the Polish Military Organisation to mobilize the Polish Legions that would serve Austria-Hungary against the Russian Empire.
- Battle of Rossignol –French division commander Léon Amédée François Raffenel and brigade commander Charles Rondony were killed while leading the 3rd Colonial Infantry Division against Germany's 11th and 12th Divisions at the village of Rossignol in Belgium. The French division was destroyed as a fighting force, with more than 10,000 colonial infantrymen killed, wounded or taken prisoner in the battle. The Germans sustained just under 4,000 casualties.
- Battle of Lorraine – The right flank of the French First Army was attacked and driven back from where it began its offensive on August 14 was still able to remain in contact with the Second Army.
- The British Expeditionary Force reached Mons. Just after 6:30 a.m. British cavalryman Captain Charles Beck Hornby was reputed to be the first British soldier to kill a German soldier using his sword, while Drummer Edward Thomas of the 4th Royal Irish Dragoon Guards was reputed to have fired the British Army's first shot of the war near the Belgian village of Casteau, the first time a British soldier fired a shot in combat on mainland western Europe since the Battle of Waterloo 99 years earlier.
- While commanding the French 24th Infantry Division at the battle of Robelmont (near Meix-devant-Virton, Belgium), French general Achille Pierre Deffontaines was shot in the head and grievously wounded, among the other 27,000 fellow soldiers that fell in battle that day. He died at a military hospital in Reims four days later, the youngest French general to die in the war.
- The German army ended the destruction of Kalisz in Poland with 95 per cent of the city's buildings burned or demolished, and only 5,000 of the 65,000 residents left in the city (most had fled when the pogrom started on August 2).
- Battle of Chra – Combined British and French forces defeated German soldiers and paramilitary police at Chra, a village on the River Chra in Togoland, West Africa. The Allied forces sustained 75 casualties while the German defenders lost 13, but most of the army deserted by the time the battle was over.
- The body of the late Pope Pius X lay in state in St. Peter's Basilica for mourners before being entombed the same day.
- An Avro 504 of the Royal Flying Corps's No. 5 Squadron on patrol over Belgium was shot down by German rifle fire, the first British aircraft ever to be destroyed in action.
- U.S. Navy destroyer Ericsson was launched from the New York Shipbuilding Corporation in Camden, New Jersey.
- An early attempt to get a Lewis gun into action in air-to-air combat failed when a Royal Flying Corps Farman armed with one scrambled to intercept a German Albatros and took 30 minutes to climb to 1,000 feet (300 meters) because of the gun's weight. On landing, the pilot was ordered to remove the Lewis gun and carry a rifle on future missions.
- The 38th season of Victorian Football Association in Australia ended with the North Melbourne Football Club defeating Footscray by 35 points in the premier final. It was the club's fourth VFA premiership, and marked the beginning of a period of unprecedented dominance for North Melbourne, which included three consecutive premierships, and a 58-match winning streak which lasted from 1914 to 1919.
- The first issue of the British war magazine The War Illustrated was published. It was discontinued in 1919 but restarted again in 1939 at the start of World War II.
- Born:
  - Jack Dunphy, American novelist and playwright, best known for his long-term relationship with Truman Capote, author of Dear Genius: A Memoir of My Life with Truman Capote; as John Paul Dunphy, in Atlantic City, New Jersey, United States (d. 1992)
  - Connie B. Gay, American music producer, credited for defining country music as a genre, first president of the Country Music Association and co-founder of the Country Music Hall of Fame and Museum; in Lizard Lick, North Carolina, United States (d. 1989)

== August 23, 1914 (Sunday) ==
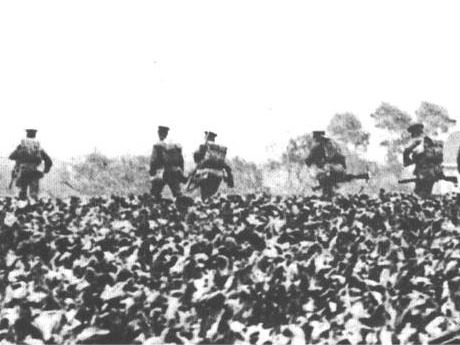
British troops retreating during the Battle of Mons.

- Japan declared war on Germany.
- Battle of Tannenberg – Fighting began between German and Russian forces. Russian author Aleksandr Solzhenitsyn blended fiction with actual events in the battle for his 1970 novel August 1914, in what became the first book in The Red Wheel cycle.
- Battle of Kraśnik – The Austro-Hungarian First Army clashed with the Russian Fourth Army at the province of Galicia (now Ukraine) bordered both the Russian and Austria-Hungarian empires, as part of larger campaign known at the Battle of Galicia.
- Battle of Mons – In its first major action, the British Expeditionary Force held the German forces but then began a month-long fighting Great Retreat to the Marne River, closing the fifth and final phase of the Battle of the Frontiers.
- Both the Battle of the Ardennes and the Battle of Charleroi ended in French defeat.
- Battle of Dinant – The German 3rd Army forced the French out of Dinant, Belgium. In the ensuing confusion of where enemy fire was coming from, the German troops began shooting civilians. In all, 654 civilians were killed and 1,200 homes burned in what was considered the largest massacre in what was deemed the "Rape of Belgium".
- Maurice Dease became the first British officer of World War I to die in combat. Dease was commanding a machine gun unit defending the main bridge to Nimy, Belgium, and when it came under attack by German forces. Eyewitnesses reported Dease continued to command fire from the machine guns despite being shot three times until all the men under his command were killed and he had died from his wounds. He was awarded the Victoria Cross posthumously, the first to be awarded in World War I.
- China canceled the German lease of Kiaochow Bay (Kiautschou).
- A New Zealand expeditionary force occupied the German colony of German Samoa, following an unopposed invasion.
- The Austro-Hungarian Schichau-class torpedo boat SMS Flamingo struck a mine around 02:30 west of Pola when she was pushed out of the safe route through the southern minefield by a strong gale and sank; the captain and six of the crew were rescued, but one officer and ten crew members were lost.

== August 24, 1914 (Monday) ==
- French Chief of Staff General Joseph Joffre ordered all French forces to withdraw from Verdun with orders to destroy rail stations along the way and inflict as many German casualties as possible for a counter-attack, in what became known as the Great Retreat.
- Battle of Lorraine – The French First and Second Army repelled the German offensive and were eventually able to regain all the ground lost by September.
- Siege of Antwerp – The Belgian army made a first sortie from Antwerp to the defensive line east of the city in an attempt to distract German reserve troops observing the city and to cut German communications through Leuven and Brussels. However, the military maneuver was halted two days later when Allied forces withdrew, forcing the Belgian troops to return to the city.
- Battle of the Trouée de Charmes – The German Third Army clashed with the French Second Army between Charmes and Lunéville, France.
- Action of Elouges – The British Expeditionary Force withdrew from Mons, Belgium, with the German Army in pursuit. British cavalry charged German guns to give British forces time to retreat, losing an entire regiment in the process.
- Siege of Maubeuge – German forces laid siege to Maubeuge in France then left behind a corps to bombard the fortress.
- Battle of Dinant – The battle ended with Dinant, Belgium, firmly in German control. The French lost between 1,200 and 1,400 casualties, while the Germans had 4,275 killed or wounded.
- German troops entered the French village of Gerbéviller and destroyed 80% of its buildings.
- French gunboats began shelling German colonial towns on the coast of German Cameroon in Africa.
- Maziua raid – German colonial troops raided Portuguese Mozambique and destroyed the military outpost Maziua, killing a dozen Portuguese soldiers in the process.
- The first fully mechanized unit of the Canadian Army—Canadian Automobile Machine Gun Brigade—was established in Ottawa under command of Brigadier-General Raymond Brutinel. The unit would later play a significant part in halting the major German offensive of March 1918.
- Winnie, a female black bear that supposedly inspired author A. A. Milne to create the character Winnie-the-Pooh, was born at the London Zoo.
- Born: John C. Morgan, American air force pilot, member of the 482nd Bomb Group during World War II and inspiration for the novel and film Twelve O'Clock High, recipient of the Medal of Honor; in Vernon, Texas, United States (d. 1991)

== August 25, 1914 (Tuesday) ==
- Japan declared war on Austria-Hungary.
- German troops ravaged the city of Leuven, Belgium, at the height of violence against civilians in what historians referred to as the Rape of Belgium. The entire population of 10,000 people were expelled from the city, along with 248 civilian deaths. More civilian deaths were reported in eastern and central Belgium including Aarschot (156 dead), Andenne (211 dead), Tamines (383 dead), and Dinant (674 dead).
- German artillery bombardments on forts forced most defending Belgium troops to retreat from Namur, Belgium, allowing German forces to take the city.
- Battle of Kraśnik – After days of cavalry and infantry attacks on both sides, Austria-Hungary was able to route Russia and inflict some 20,000 casualties, including 6,000 prisoners, while sustaining 15,000 casualties.
- Togoland Campaign – British and French forces conquered the German colony of Togoland in West Africa.
- Kamerun campaign – German and British forces clashed for the first time in the Battle of Tepe, a German border station on the Benue River of German Cameroon. The Germans abandoned the station during the British assault.
- Mexican Revolution – Mexican revolutionary leader Emiliano Zapata agreed to lay down arms and recognize the new Mexican government on condition it accepted the agrarian reforms laid out in the Plan of Ayala.
- Flying a Morane-Saulnier Type G monoplane, Imperial Russian Army pilot Pyotr Nesterov became the first pilot to down an enemy aircraft in aerial combat. After firing unsuccessfully with a pistol at an Austro-Hungarian Albatros B.II crewed by Franz Malina (pilot) and Baron Friederich von Rosenthal (observer), Nesterov rammed the Albatros. Both aircraft crashed, killing all three men.
- The library of the Catholic University of Leuven was set on fire by German troops during the Rape of Belgium, resulting in the destruction of over 300,000 medieval books and manuscripts.
- Canadian Arctic Expedition – Efforts to rescue the remaining survivors of the Karluk on Wrangel Island in the Bering Sea were delayed when Bear, the rescue ship, was stopped by ice 20 miles (32 km) from the island. After failing to force a way through, the ship returned to Nome for more coal.
- Born: Hermann Hogeback, German air force pilot, commander of Lehrgeschwader 1 for the Luftwaffe during World War II, recipient of the Knight's Cross of the Iron Cross; in Idar-Oberstein, German Empire (present-day Germany) (d. 2004)
- Died: Powell Clayton, 81, American politician, U.S. Senator of Arkansas from 1868 until 1871, U.S. Ambassador to Mexico from 1899 to 1905 (b. 1833)

== August 26, 1914 (Wednesday) ==
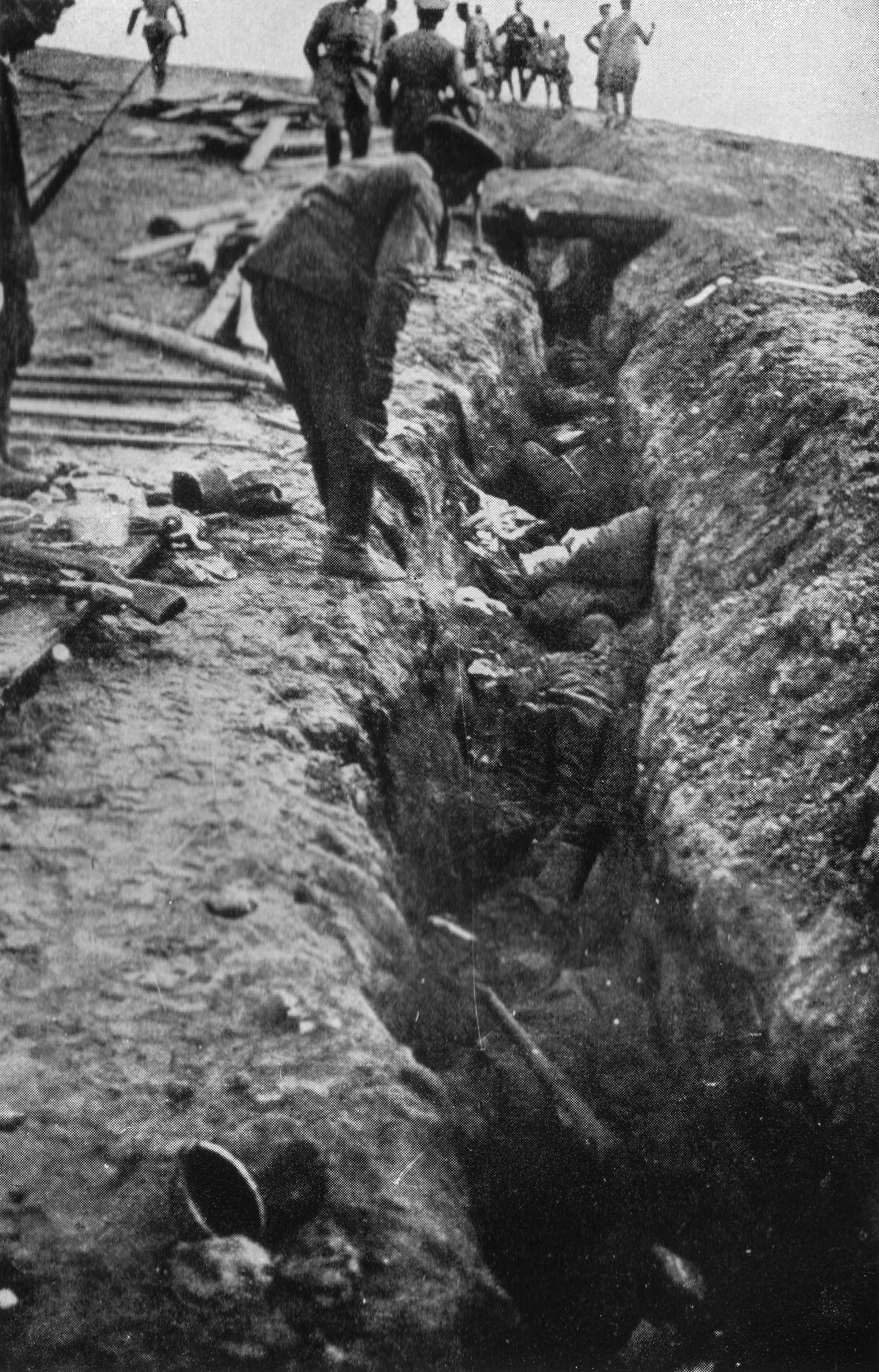
Dead Russian soldiers in a trench during the Battle of Tannenberg.

- Battle of Tannenberg – The main battle began between the Russian Second Army under command of General Alexander Samsonov and the German Eighth Army under command of Colonel General Paul von Hindenburg and Major General Erich Ludendorff.
- Siege of Antwerp – A German Zeppelin airship bombed the city, killing 10 civilians.
- Battle of Mulhouse – Despite successes in taking German territory, the French Army of Alsace was recalled, disbanded and merged with other defending armies closer to Paris as the Western Front began to form.
- Battle of Lorraine – The battle officially ended in a French victory, but with a loss of 65,000 casualties. German casualties remained unknown although analysis of German army records in 2009 suggested the German Sixth and German Seventh Armies sustained over 36,000 casualties.
- Battle of Le Cateau – British and French Allies retreated from Le Cateau under withering German artillery fire to Saint Quentin, France, sustaining over 7,800 casualties, including 2,600 taken prisoner and 38 artillery guns abandoned. The battle began the start of the Great Retreat.
- Battle of the Trouée de Charmes – The French Second Army prevented the German advance past Charmes, France.
- The 2nd Connaught Rangers covered the retreat of the British 5th Infantry Brigade as part of the Great Retreat in France, despite the loss of nearly 300 men.
- Battle of Galicia – The Battle of Komarów began when Austrian-Hungarian forces under command of Field Marshal Franz Conrad von Hötzendorf attempted to break through the Russian line in Ukraine, but stiff resistance forced them back.
- A military government was established to govern German-occupied territories of Belgium under command of Field Marshal Colmar Freiherr von der Goltz. Goltz was later reassigned to commanding German forces in the Ottoman Empire and succeeded by General Moritz von Bissing on November 27.
- British Royal Navy protected cruiser HMS Highflyer forced the SS Kaiser Wilhelm der Grosse, sailing as an auxiliary cruiser, to scuttle off the Spanish Saharan territory of Río de Oro.
- A pair of Russian battle cruisers shelled German cruiser SMS Magdeburg after she ran aground on an island in the Gulf of Finland, killing 15 crewmen.
- American cargo ship Admiral Sampson collided with Canadian passenger ship Princess Victoria ship in Puget Sound, Washington, killing 15 passengers and crew.
- Members of the Bengali revolutionary group Anushilan Samiti stole an arms shipment in Calcutta in a daring daytime robbery.
- The French Sixth Army was established.
- The Iraq Area Command for the Ottoman Army was established in Baghdad and Basra.
- Rutland Boughton's fairy-tale opera The Immortal Hour was first performed in Glastonbury Assembly Rooms at the inaugural Glastonbury Festival co-founded by the English socialist composer.
- The association football club Palmeiras was established in São Paulo.
- Born:
  - Julio Cortázar, Belgian-Argentine writer, one of the founding writers of the Latin American Boom; in Ixelles, Belgium (d. 1984)
  - Atilio García, Argentine-Uruguayan association football player, became the second-highest all-time goal-scorer in Uruguayan football during his time with the Club Nacional de Football from 1938 to 1951; as Atilio Ceferino García Pérez, in Junín, Buenos Aires, Argentina (d. 1973)
  - Alan Brown, English association football player, centre half for the Huddersfield Town, Burnley and Notts County clubs from 1933 to 1949; in Corbridge, England (d. 1996)

== August 27, 1914 (Thursday) ==
- Battle of Tannenberg – The Russian Second Army maintained a steady advance on the German line, but lack of surveillance and communication prevented General Alexander Samsonov from becoming fully aware that his flanks were breaking down.
- The 2nd Royal Munster Fusiliers of the British Expeditionary Force halted a German advance for 14 hours while allowing the rest of the force to retreat. By nightfall, the Munsters were surrounded and forced to surrender but succeeded in allowing the British Army to escape.
- Siege of Antwerp – The Belgian army lost its offensive capacity and ordered its troops to Péronne in France to bolster defenses.
- Siege of Tsingtao – The Imperial Japanese Navy and Royal Navy set up a blockade at the German colonial port of Tsingtao, China. The first air-sea battle in history also occurred when Imperial Japanese Navy Farman seaplanes unsuccessfully tried to bomb German and Austro-Hungarian ships in Kiaochow Bay.
- The Royal Naval Air Service's famed Eastchurch Squadron arrived in France for World War I service, commanded by Wing Commander Charles Samson.
- Kamerun campaign – Captain R. W. Fox, commander of British colonial forces in Nigeria, led a force to assault the German garrison dug in on a mountain near Mora, German Cameroon but were pushed back, in part due to heavy fog the following day.
- Ramón Báez succeeded José Bordas Valdez as President of the Dominican Republic.
- Charlie Chaplin directed his 10th film with The Masquerader which he co-starred with Roscoe Arbuckle.
- Died: Eugen Böhm von Bawerk, 63, Austrian economist, contributed to the development of the Austrian School of Economics (b. 1851)

== August 28, 1914 (Friday) ==
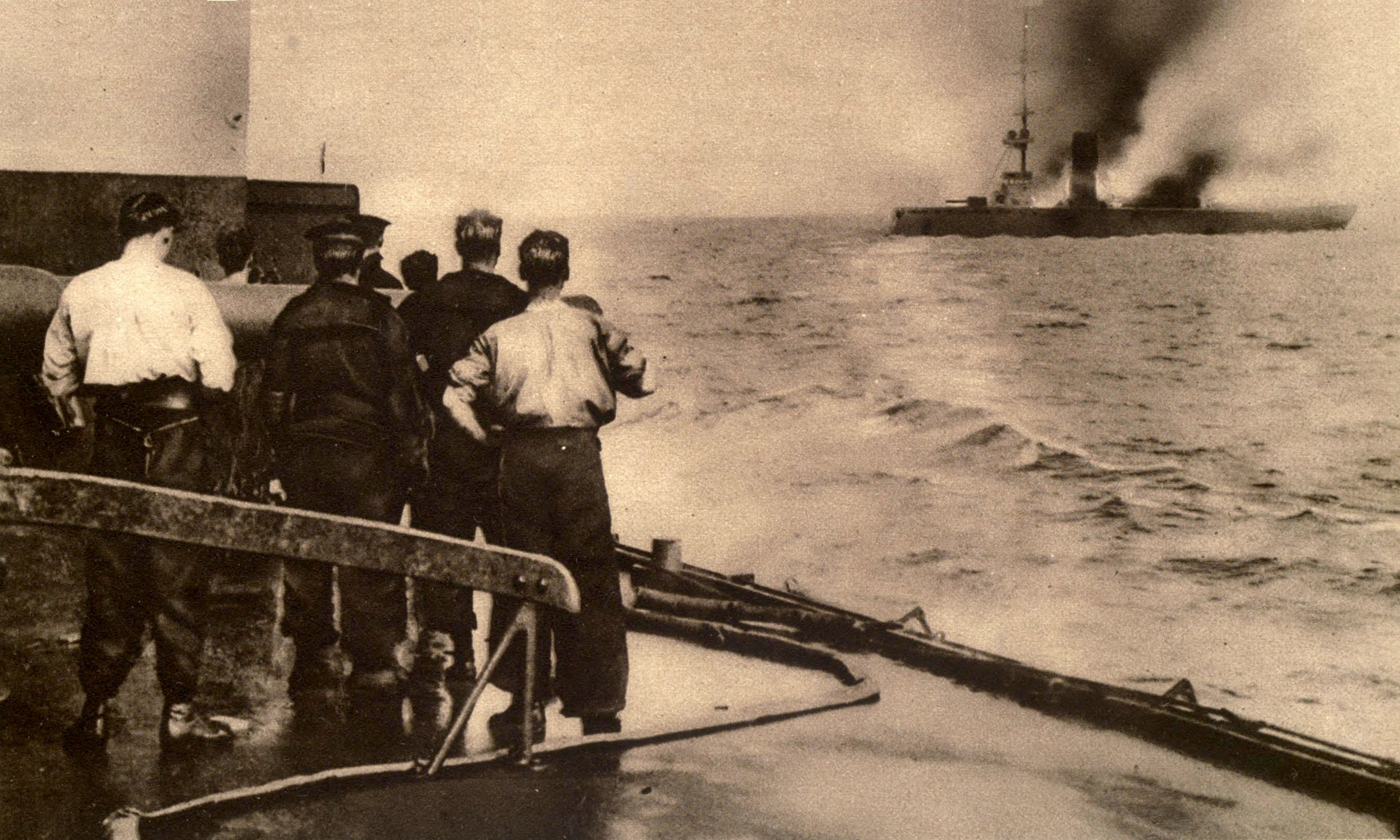
British sailors watch the German cruiser SMS Mainz sink during the Battle of Heligoland Bight.

- Battle of Heligoland Bight – The first naval battle between Great Britain and Germany took place in the North Sea off the German coast. The British fleet under the command of Admiral David Beatty defeated the German fleet under Admiral Franz von Hipper, with Germany losing light cruisers SMS Mainz, Cöln and Ariadne, and destroyer SMS V187 along with 1,200 casualties, including Rear Admiral Leberecht Maass who was commanding the Cöln. The British lost no ships and only a few dozen casualties.
- Battle of Tannenberg – Lack of food and ammunition forced the Russian Second Army to begin withdrawing.
- The Princess Patricia's Canadian Light Infantry left Ottawa for Montreal to board the SS Megantic for Europe, the first Canadian military regiment mobilized for World War I.
- The funeral mass for Pope Pius X was held in the Sistine Chapel at Vatican City with nearly 50 cardinals in attendance. The conclave to choose a new pope began the next day.

== August 29, 1914 (Saturday) ==
- Battle of Tannenberg – German forces surrounded the retreating Russian Second Army in open fields at the village of Frogenau, east of Tannenberg where many were mowed down by enemy fire.
- Battle of St. Quentin – The French Fifth Army attacked Saint-Quentin, France, but German forces were alerted of the attack by a captured French officer. The Germans prevented French troops from entering the town although successful French attacks forced some of the units to fall back. In all, the French sustained 10,000 casualties while Germany took 7,000 casualties.
- Battle of Gnila Lipa – Austrian-Hungarian forces reformed a new line of defense on the Gnila Lipa River in Ukraine against the Imperial Russian Army.
- Siege of Maubeuge – Germany artillery began to bombard the fortress in Maubeuge, and would capture it within a week.
- Russian troops killed between 65 and 74 ethnic Germans in the village of Abschwangen, East Prussia.
- Kamerun campaign – The British Royal West African Frontier Force clashed with German troops in the First Battle of Garua, a border post near the port city of Garoua, German Cameroon. The battle ended as a massive failure for British colonial forces, having been pushed back into Nigeria.
- The Liverpool Pals were formed as part of the King's regiment in Liverpool.
- The 10th Battalion of the East Yorkshire Regiment, better known as the Hull Pals, was established in Kingston upon Hull, England.
- The 3rd Canadian Infantry Brigade of the Canadian Expeditionary Force was established.
- The village of Worth, Illinois was incorporated.

== August 30, 1914 (Sunday) ==
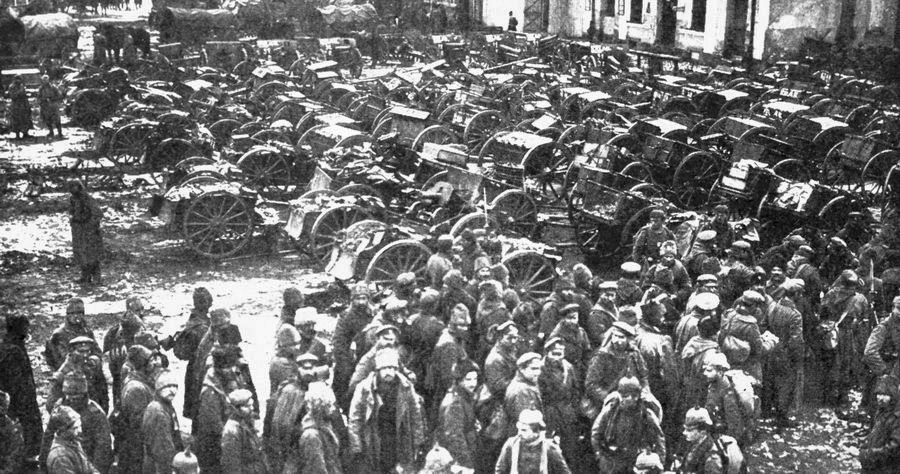
Russian prisoners of war after the Battle of Tannenberg.

- Battle of Tannenberg – German forces almost completely annihilated the Russian Second Army with 92,000 captured, 78,000 killed or wounded, and only 10,000 escaping. German forces only lost 12,000 out of the 150,000 men committed to the battle. Rather than notify Tsar Nicholas of the defeat, commanding general Alexander Samsonov left his field headquarters and disappeared into the nearby woods. A German search party came across his body a year later, with evidence the Russian officer had committed suicide with his own pistol. The Red Cross arranged to return his body to his family.
- Battle of St. Quentin – French forces received the order to retreat from Saint-Quentin, but were able to repulse any German counterattacks.
- Battle of Gnila Lipa – Austrian-Hungarian forces attempted to take advantage of a 48-hour delay for the Imperial Russian Army to reorganize for attack with a new assault, but the opposing side had more artillery guns. The defense line collapsed and 20,000 Austrian-Hungarian troops were taken prisoner during the retreat.
- German aircraft bombed Paris for the first time, killing one civilian. German warplanes also attacked the city the following day.
- New Zealand troops landed at German Samoa in the Pacific Ocean and occupied the German colony until 1920.
- Mexican Revolution – Mexican revolutionary leader Emiliano Zapata agreed to support the new Mexican government under Venustiano Carranza.
- An Armenian militia of members with the Social Democrat Hunchakian Party was organized in the city of Zeitun (Süleymanlı), Turkey to resist the Ottoman Empire.
- Batavia defeated Semarang 1–0 in the final of the DEI Championship in the Dutch East Indies.
- Born:
  - Jack Grisman, British air force officer, member of the No. 109 Squadron and escapee from German prisoner of war camp Stalag Luft III; as William Jack Grisman, in Hereford, England (executed, 1944)
  - Steven Sykes, British artist, noted for his camouflage designs for the British Army during World War II and the redesign for Coventry Cathedral; in Formby, England (d. 1999)

== August 31, 1914 (Monday) ==
- The Vatican held a papal conclave to choose a successor to Pope Pius X, who died on August 20.
- Kamerun campaign – The First Battle of Garua ended when British colonial troops were pushed out of German Cameroon after unsuccessfully trying to capture key forts in Garúa.
- The British Army established the 60th, 62nd, 63rd, 64th, 65th, and 66th Infantry Divisions.
- American ambassador to the Ottoman Empire Henry Morgenthau Sr. reported Jewish Palestine settlements were deteriorating as fighting was cutting off supply channels in a telegraph to American Jewish banker Jacob Schiff. Schiff then organized the American Jewish Joint Distribution Committee to campaign and collect private aid funding through other Jewish organizations to support the Middle East settlements.

== Sources ==
- Gröner, Erich (1990). German Warships: 1815–1945, Volume 1: Major Surface Warships. Annapolis: Naval Institute Press. ISBN 0-87021-790-9.
- Haulman, Daniel L. (2003). "One Hundred Years of Flight: USAF Chronology of Significant Air and Space Events 1903–2002" (PDF). Maxwell Air Force Base, Alabama: Air University Press. Archived from the original (PDF) on February 22, 2004.
- Tucker, Spencer (2005). World War I: encyclopedia. ABC-CLIO. ISBN 1-85109-420-2.
- Histories of Two Hundred and Fifty-One Divisions of the German Army Which Participated in the War (1914-1918). Document (United States. War Department) No. 905. Washington, D.C.: Government Printing Office. 1920. OCLC 1387464.
