= Mo Heng Tan =

Indonesian footballer

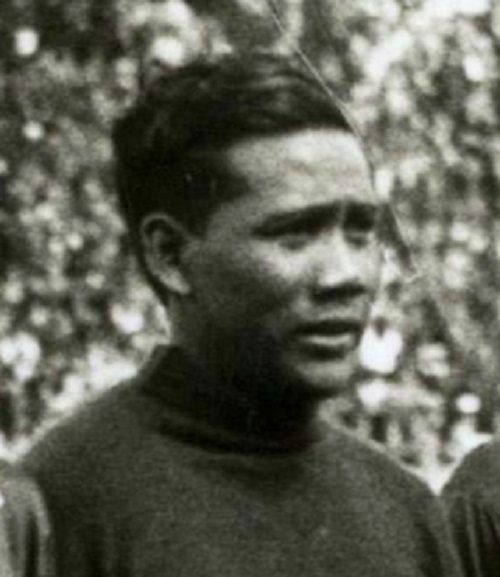

Personal information
- Full name: Mo Heng Tan
- Date of birth: 28 February 1913
- Place of birth: Dutch East Indies
- Position: Goalkeeper

Senior career*
Years	Team	Apps	(Gls)
193?—194?	HCTNH Malang		
194?—1951	Tiong Hoa Soerabaja		
1951—195?	Chung Hua		

International career
1938	Dutch East Indies	2	(0)
1951	Indonesia	1	(0)
- * Club domestic league appearances and goals

Mo Heng (Bing) Tan (born 28 February 1913–unknown death date) was an Indonesian footballer who played as a goalkeeper for the Dutch East Indies football team during the 1938 FIFA World Cup in France. The Dutch East Indian team only played one match after losing 0–6 to Hungary. He also had a mascot for the match. Tan became the only ex-Dutch East Indian team player to represent independent Indonesia in 1951, in an unofficial match against a Sino-Malayan Selection from Singapore. Tan is deceased.

== Honours ==
SVB (Soerabajasche Voetbalbond)

- Dutch East Indies Championship: 1950
