= Reinier Beeuwkes =

Dutch footballer (1884–1963)

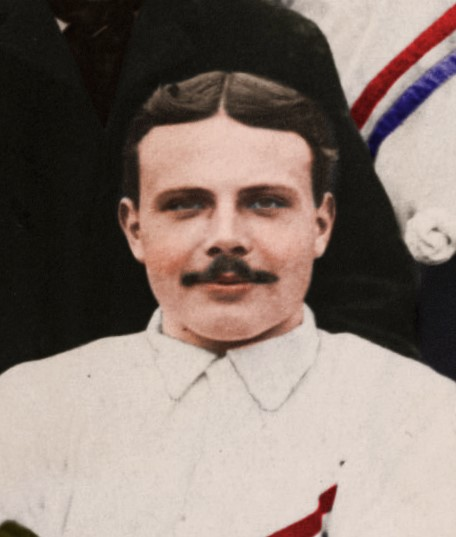
- Reinier Beeuwkes in 1905

Personal information
- Full name: Reinier Bertus Beeuwkes
- Date of birth: 17 February 1884
- Place of birth: The Hague, Netherlands
- Date of death: 1 April 1963 (aged 79)
- Place of death: The Hague, Netherlands
- Position: Goalkeeper

Senior career*
Years	Team	Apps	(Gls)
–1903	Quick		
1903–1910	DFC	111	(0)

International career
1905–1910	Netherlands	19	(0)
Medal record
Men's football
Representing Netherlands
Olympic Games
Bronze medal – third place	1908 London	Team competition
- * Club domestic league appearances and goals

Reinier Bertus Beeuwkes (17 February 1884 – 1 April 1963) was a Dutch footballer.

== Club career ==
Beeuwkes was born in The Hague and played for local side Quick. At the beginning of the 20th century he moved to play as a goalkeeper for DFC.

== International career ==
On 30 April 1905, Beeuwkes played for the Netherlands in its first international game, when it won 4:1 against Belgium in an away game at Antwerp.

Until 1910, he remained goalkeeper for the national team, contributing considerably to its development as one of the strongest European teams of the period. The high point of his career was playing for the Netherlands in the 1908 Summer Olympics, that included football for the first time. After Hungary and Bohemia withdrew their teams, the Netherlands reached the semi-final uncontested when it lost 4:0 to the later winners, England. However, it received a bronze medal for its 2:0 win against Sweden. He was known for his punching of the ball instead of catching it and for playing in exactly the same kit as the outfield players.

== Personal life ==
In 1910, he terminated his footballing career and emigrated to the Dutch East Indies, but he died in the city of his birth, The Hague.

== Career statistics ==
=== International ===
Netherlands national team
Year	Apps	Goals
1905	2	0
1907	3	0
1908	6	0
1909	4	0
1910	4	0
Total	19	0

== Honours ==
WJVB Batavia

- Stedenwedstrijden: 1914
