= Stom =

Stom may refer to:

- Ben Stom (1886–1965), Dutch footballer
- Matthias Stom (c. 1600 – after 1652), Dutch, or possibly Flemish, Caravaggist painter

== See also ==
- STOM, also known as Stomatin, is a human gene
