= 1950 DEI Championship =

The 1950 DEI Championship season was the 32nd season and also the last edition of the Dutch East Indies Championship football competition since its establishment in 1914. Soerabaja are the defending champions, having won their 11th league title.

This is the second edition the league organised by V.U.V.S.I./I.S.N.I.S., It was contested by 7 teams, and Soerabaja won the championship.

== League table ==
Team	Pld	W	D	L	GF	GA	GD	Pts
Surabaja (C)	6	4	2	0	17	5	+12	10
Malang	6	3	2	1	15	9	+6	8
Djakarta	6	3	2	1	7	6	+1	8
Makassar	6	2	2	2	8	8	0	6
Medan	6	2	1	3	8	9	−1	5
Semarang	6	1	2	3	8	10	−2	4
Bandung	6	0	1	5	5	17	−12	1

Rules for classification: 2 points for a win; 1 point for a draw.
(C) Champions

== Result ==
=== Voortoernooi in Surabaja ===
All matches play in Surabaja.

14 April 1950

Surabaja	3 – 0	Semarang
	Report

Surabaja

15 April 1950

Malang	1 – 1	Semarang
	Report

Surabaja

16 April 1950

Surabaja	3 – 3	Malang
	Report

Surabaja

17 April 1950

Surabaja	2 – 0	Bandung
	Report

Surabaja

18 April 1950

Malang	5 – 2	Bandung
	Report

Surabaja

=== Voortoernooi in Djakarta ===
All matches play in Djakarta.

28 April 1950

Djakarta	1 – 0	Bandung
	Report

Djakarta

29 April 1950

Bandung	0 – 3	Medan
	Report

Djakarta

30 April 1950

Djakarta	2 – 0	Medan
	Report

Djakarta

1 May 1950

Semarang	2 – 2	Medan
	Report

Djakarta

2 May 1950

Djakarta	2 – 1	Semarang
	Report

Djakarta

=== Voorwedstrĳden Makassar ===
13 May 1950

Surabaja	2 – 0	Makassar
	Report

Surabaja

14 May 1950

Malang	0 – 2	Makassar
	Report

Surabaja

17 May 1950

Semarang	1 – 2	Makassar
	Report

Semarang

20 May 1950

Djakarta	0 – 0	Makassar
	Report

Djakarta

21 May 1950

Bandung	3 – 3	Makassar
	Report

Djakarta

=== Eindtoernooi ===
All matches play in Bandung.

25 May 1950

Medan	2 – 1	Makassar
	Report

Bandung

26 May 1950

Djakarta	0 – 3	Malang
	Report

Bandung

27 May 1950

Surabaja	1 – 0	Medan
	Report

Bandung

28 May 1950

Bandung	0 – 3	Semarang
	Report

Bandung

29 May 1950

Medan	1 – 3	Malang
	Report

Bandung

30 May 1950

Djakarta	2 – 2	Surabaja
	Report

Bandung
