= Suvarte Soedarmadji =

Indonesian footballer

Personal information
- Date of birth: 6 December 1915
- Place of birth: Dutch East Indies
- Date of death: 1979
- Position: Forward

Senior career*
Years	Team	Apps	(Gls)
- HBS Soerabaja

International career
- Dutch East Indies
- * Club domestic league appearances and goals

Suvarte Soedarmadji (6 December 1915 – 1979) was an Indonesian football forward who played for the Dutch East Indies in the 1938 FIFA World Cup. He also played for HBS Soerabaja.

== Honours ==
HBS Soerabaja

- SVB Hoofdklasse: 1935–36, 1936–37, 1937–38, 1940–41

SVB (Soerabajasche Voetbalbond)

- Dutch East Indies Championship: 1936, 1940-1941
