= Herman Zomers =

Indonesian footballer

Herman V. Zomers
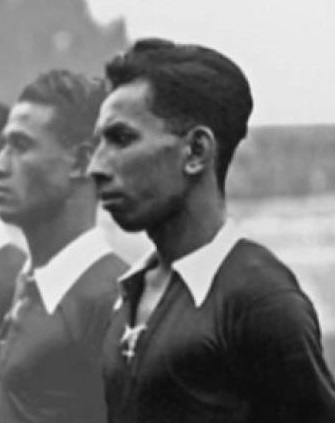

Personal information
- Date of birth: 19 November 1912
- Place of birth: Dutch East Indies
- Date of death: 19 June 1959 (aged 46)
- Position: Forward

Senior career*
Years	Team	Apps	(Gls)
- Hercules Batavia

International career
- Dutch East Indies
- * Club domestic league appearances and goals

Herman Zomers (19 November 1912 – 19 June 1959) was an Indonesian football forward who played for Hercules Batavia and for the Dutch East Indies in the 1938 FIFA World Cup.

== Personal life ==
Herman Zomers was married to Marie Berendsen.

== Honours ==
VBO (Voetbalbond Batavia en Omstreken)

- Dutch East Indies Championship: 1935, 1939
