= Tjaak Pattiwael =

Indonesian footballer (1914–1987)

Personal information
- Full name: Isaak "Tjaak" Pattiwael
- Date of birth: 23 February 1914
- Place of birth: Dutch East Indies
- Date of death: 16 March 1987 (aged 73)
- Position: Forward

Senior career*
Years	Team	Apps	(Gls)
- VV Jong Ambon Batavia

International career
- Dutch East Indies
- * Club domestic league appearances and goals

Isaak "Tjaak" Pattiwael (23 February 1914 – 16 March 1987) was an Indonesian football forward who played for the Dutch East Indies in the 1938 FIFA World Cup. He also played for VV Jong Ambon Batavia.

== Honours ==
VBO (Voetbalbond Batavia en Omstreken)

- Dutch East Indies Championship: 1938, 1939
