= 1914 DEI Championship =

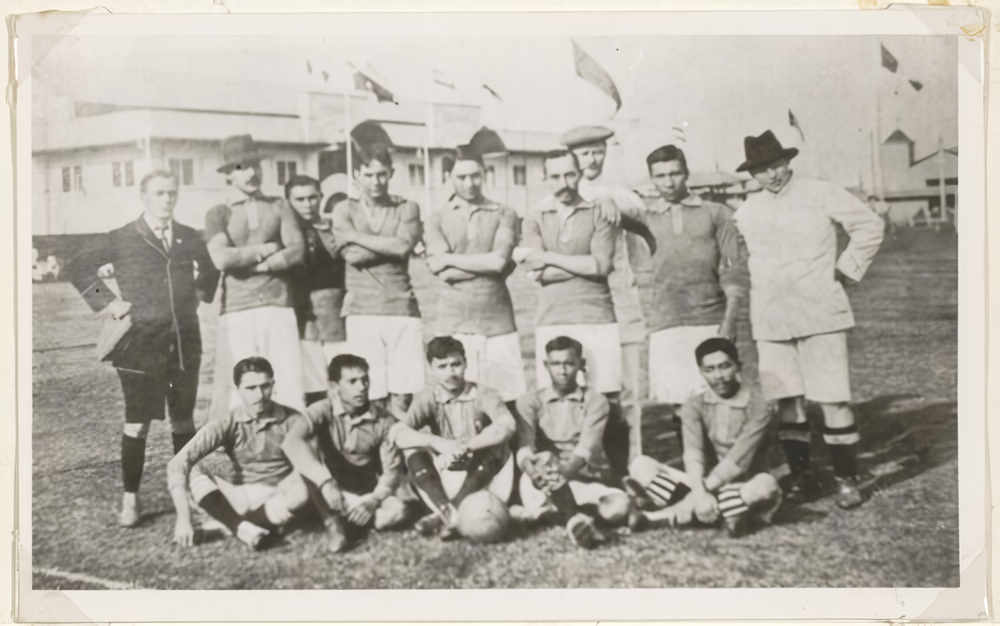

The 1914 DEI Championship season (known as the Koloniale-Tentoonstellings-Beker for organisation reasons) was the inaugural season of the Dutch East Indies DEI Championship football competition since its establishment in 1914.

It was contested by 4 teams, and Batavia won the championship.

== Result ==
=== Semifinals ===
29 August 1914

Batavia	5 – 0	Bandoeng
Davies ??'; Jolly ??'; Cramm ??', ??'; Heuer ??'	Report

Semarang

BATAVIA: 2-3-5
GK	(Netherlands) Reinier Beeuwkes
DF	(Dutch East Indies) Overakker (c)
DF	(Dutch East Indies) Johannes
MF	(Dutch East Indies) Kooymans
MF	(Dutch East Indies) Versteegh
MF	(Dutch East Indies) Olive
FW	(Dutch East Indies) Heuer
FW	(Dutch East Indies) Jolly
FW	(Dutch East Indies) Fischer
FW	(Dutch East Indies) Davies
FW	(Dutch East Indies) Cramm
Substitutes:
DF	(Netherlands) Ben Stom
Manager:

BANDOENG: 2-3-5
GK	(Dutch East Indies) Mian
DF	(Dutch East Indies) Stumpf
DF	(Dutch East Indies) Stam
MF	(Dutch East Indies) Boers
MF	(Dutch East Indies) Vink
MF	(Dutch East Indies) Grumbkow
FW	(Dutch East Indies) Van der Worm
FW	(Dutch East Indies) Endih
FW	(Dutch East Indies) Belloni
FW	(Dutch East Indies) Eichperger
FW	(Dutch East Indies) Jansen
Substitutes:
Manager:

30 August 1914

Semarang	3 – 1	Soerabaja
Phelan ??'; Pilow ??'; Pas ??'	Report	??' Galstaun

Semarang
Referee: Ten Bruggencate (Batavia)

SEMARANG: 2-3-5
GK	(Netherlands) Van Soest
DF	(Dutch East Indies) Blommesteyn
DF	(Dutch East Indies) Valk
MF	(Dutch East Indies) Kamperdĳk
MF	(Dutch East Indies) Gantvoort
MF	(Dutch East Indies) Rogge
FW	(Dutch East Indies) Pilow
FW	(Netherlands) Guus Lutjens
FW	(Dutch East Indies) Phelan
FW	(Dutch East Indies) Jr. Pas
FW	(Dutch East Indies) Valk
Substitutes:
Manager:

BANDOENG: 2-3-5
GK	(Dutch East Indies) Kloesmeyer
DF	(Dutch East Indies) Van der Lee
DF	(Dutch East Indies) Weyschedee
MF	(Dutch East Indies) Van Damme
MF	(Dutch East Indies) Gobius
MF	(Dutch East Indies) Middelkoop
FW	(Dutch East Indies) Van der Elst
FW	(Dutch East Indies) Swart
FW	(Dutch East Indies) Leslie Miller
FW	(Dutch East Indies) Galstaun
FW	(Dutch East Indies) Martens
Substitutes:
Manager:

=== Final ===
31 August 1914

Semarang	0 – 1	Batavia
	Report	??' Davies ??' Jolly ??' Fischer

Semarang
Referee: Ouwehand (Bandoeng)

SEMARANG: 2-3-5
GK	(Netherlands) Van Soest
DF	(Dutch East Indies) Blommesteyn
DF	(Dutch East Indies) Valk
MF	(Dutch East Indies) Kamperdĳk
MF	(Dutch East Indies) Gantvoort
MF	(Dutch East Indies) Rogge
FW	(Dutch East Indies) Pilow
FW	(Netherlands) Guus Lutjens
FW	(Dutch East Indies) Phelan
FW	(Dutch East Indies) Jr. Pas
FW	(Dutch East Indies) Valk
Substitutes:
Manager:

BATAVIA: 2-3-5
GK	(Netherlands) Reinier Beeuwkes
DF	(Netherlands) Ben Stom (c)
DF	(Dutch East Indies) Johannes
MF	(Dutch East Indies) Kooymans
MF	(Dutch East Indies) Versteegh
MF	(Dutch East Indies) Olive
FW	(Dutch East Indies) Heuer
FW	(Dutch East Indies) Jolly
FW	(Dutch East Indies) Fischer
FW	(Dutch East Indies) Davies
FW	(Dutch East Indies) Cramm
Substitutes:
DF	(Dutch East Indies) Overakker
Manager:

== Top goalscorers ==
This is a list of top scorers in the 1914 season.

Position	Players	Clubs	Goals
1	(Dutch East Indies) Cramm	Batavia	2
1	(Dutch East Indies) Davies	Batavia	2
1	(Dutch East Indies) Jolly	Batavia	2
4	(Dutch East Indies) Fischer	Batavia	1
4	(Dutch East Indies) Heuer	Batavia	1
4	(Dutch East Indies) Jr. Pas	Semarang	1
4	(Dutch East Indies) Phelan	Semarang	1
4	(Dutch East Indies) Pilow	Semarang	1
4	(Dutch East Indies) Galstaun	Soerabaja	1
