= 1922 DEI Championship =

The 1922 DEI Championship season (known as the Gouden Kampioens-Medaille) was the 9th season of the Dutch East Indies Championship football competition since its establishment in 1914. Batavia are the defending champions, having won their 6th league title.

This is the first edition played in league rather than knock-out format. It was contested by 4 teams, and Soerabaja won the championship.

== League table ==
Pos	Team	Pld	W	D	L	GF	GA	GD	Pts
1	Soerabaja (C)	3	3	0	0	5	1	+4	6
2	Batavia	3	2	0	1	6	2	+4	4
3	Bandoeng	3	1	0	2	4	6	−2	2
4	Semarang	3	0	0	3	2	8	−6	0

Rules for classification: 2 points for a win and 1 point for a draw.
(C) Champions

== Result ==
All matches play in Bandoeng.

3 June 1922

Bandoeng	1 – 2	Soerabaja
	Report

Bandoeng

3 June 1922

Batavia	4 – 0	Semarang
	Report

Bandoeng

4 June 1922

Bandoeng	0 – 2	Batavia
	Report

Bandoeng

4 June 1922

Soerabaja	1 – 0	Semarang
	Report

Bandoeng

5 June 1922

Bandoeng	3 – 2	Semarang
	Report

Bandoeng

5 June 1922

Soerabaja	2 – 0	Batavia
	Report

Bandoeng
