= Achmad Nawir =

Indonesian footballer

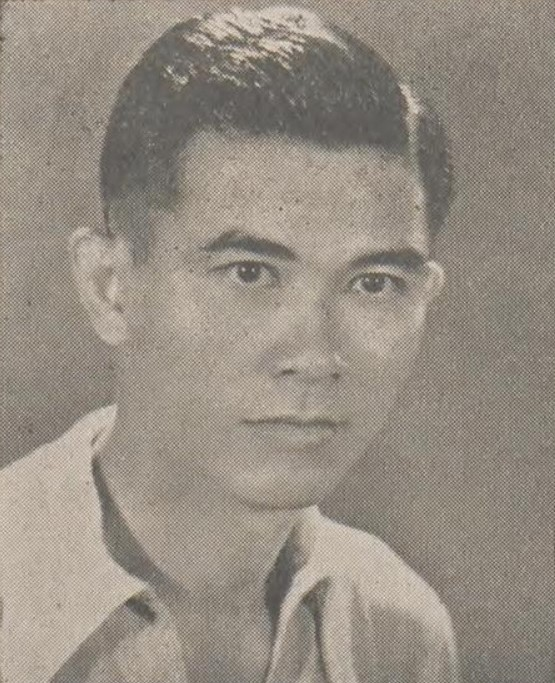
- Nawir in 1938

Personal information
- Full name: Achmad Nawir
- Date of birth: 30 June 1912
- Place of birth: Manindjau, Danaudistricten en Matur, Agam, Sumatra's Westkust, Dutch East Indies (now Maninjau, Tanjung Raya, Agam, West Sumatra, Indonesia)
- Date of death: 1 April 1995 (aged 83)
- Position: Midfielder

Senior career*
Years	Team	Apps	(Gls)
1931–1942	HBS Soerabaja	?	(?)

International career
1938	Dutch East Indies (Indonesia)	2	(0)
- * Club domestic league appearances and goals

Achmad Nawir (30 June 1912 – 1 April 1995) was an Indonesian doctor and footballer. Nawir played for HBS Soerabaja and the Dutch East Indies (Indonesia) national team.

== Career ==
Nawir is noted for captaining of the Dutch East Indies national team (predecessor of Indonesia national team) while it crashed out in defeat to Hungary at the 1938 FIFA World Cup, 6–0. Curiously, the other captain, György Sárosi, had a doctorate degree, the same as Nawir. Nawir wore his studious glasses for the match. Dutch East Indies automatically qualified for the tournament after their original opponents, Japan, withdrew from the qualifying round. He is one of the few players to wear glasses in the World Cup. Nawir and most of his teammates only played in two international matches, one against Hungary in the World Cup and another against Netherlands, losing 9–2 in a friendly game just after the World Cup. It was the last international match for the Dutch East Indies, which became the independent nation of Indonesia in 1945.

== Honours ==
HBS Soerabaja

- SVB Hoofdklasse: 1935–36, 1936–37, 1937–38, 1940–41

SVB (Soerabajasche Voetbalbond)

- Dutch East Indies Championship: 1936, 1940-1941

Individual

- IFFHS Men’s All Time Indonesia Dream Team: 2022

Preceded by -	Indonesian Captain; 1938	Succeeded by Muhammad Sidhi
