= Daniel L. Haulman =

American Air Force historian, writer

Daniel Lee Haulman
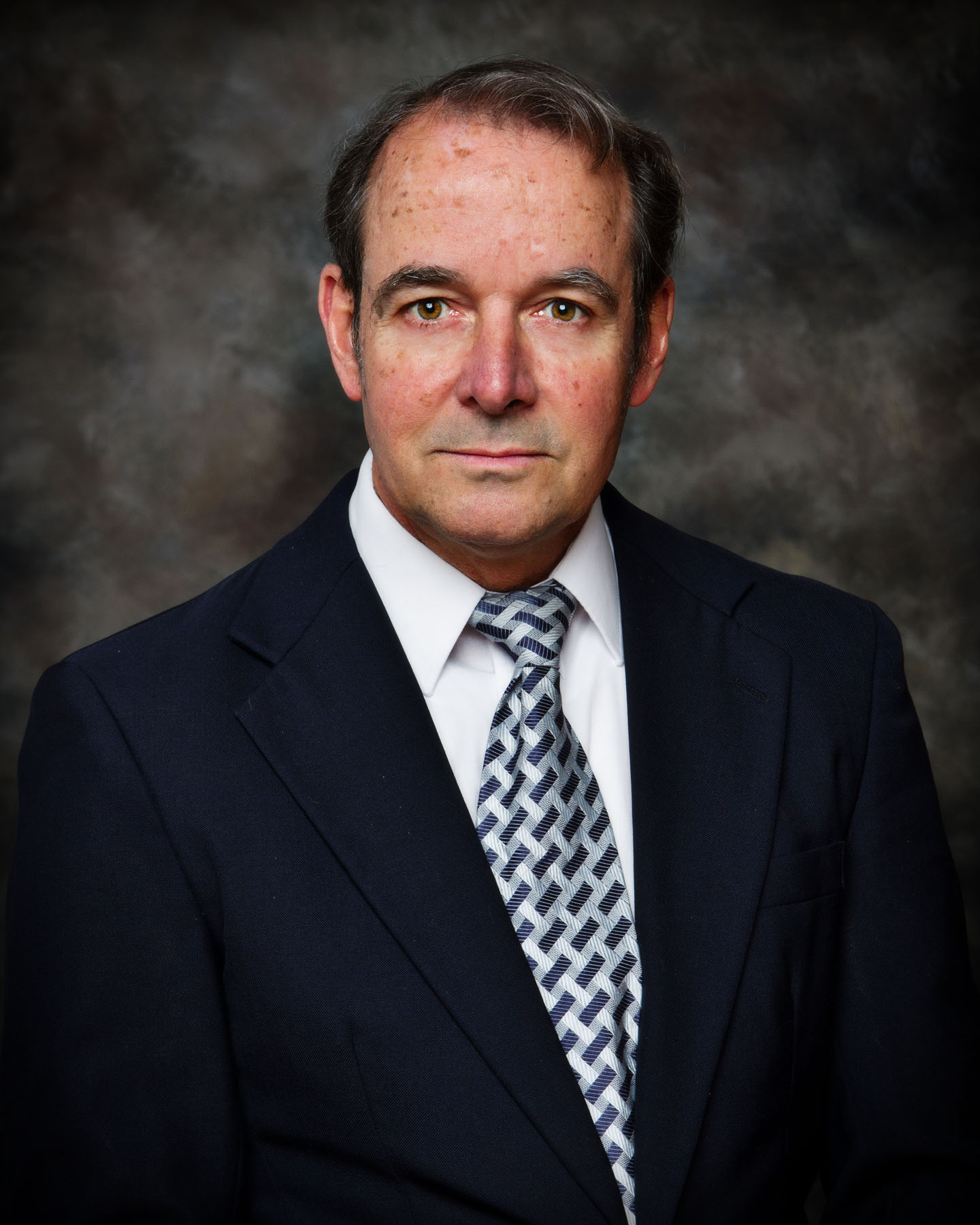
- Education: History
- Alma mater: University of Southwestern Louisiana (BA), University of New Orleans (MEd), Auburn University (Ph.D.)
- Occupations: Historian, writer, teacher
- Spouse: Ellen Evans Haulman
- Children: 1
- Writing career
- Subjects: Air Force, Tuskegee Airmen
- Notable awards: Milo B. Howard award

Daniel Lee Haulman is an American military historian, writer, and teacher. He has written many books, with several focused on the Tuskegee Airmen. He retired in September 2019 as the Chief of Organizational History Division at the Air Force Historical Research Agency.

== Education ==
Haulman earned his bachelor's degree from the University of Southwestern Louisiana, and his master's degree from the University of New Orleans. After teaching social studies in high schools for some time, Haulman decided he wanted to teach at a more "collegiate" level. He attended Auburn University, and graduated in 1983 with a doctorate in history.

While earning his Ph.D., Haulman began working for the Maxwell-Gunter Air Force Base in the Air Force Historical Research Agency, located in Montgomery. He started off as a co-op, and after graduating, moved up in position to the research division. A primary duty required him to keep track of the Air Force's aerial victory credits. Haulman chose to chronicle the entire history of the Tuskegee Airmen.

Haulman was employed at the Air Force Historical Agency from 1982 until 2019. He continues to write and speak on historical topics, particularly related to Air Force history.

He is the author of 16 published articles, and has presented more than 20 historical papers at various historical conferences. This includes the Society for Military History in Charleston, South Carolina, and at the 2005 Alabama Historical Association Meeting.

Haulman has written five books, all focused on the topic of aviation history. He received the Milo B. Howard award from the Alabama Historical Association for his article: "The Tuskegee Airmen and the 'Never lost a Bomber' Myth", which was published in the Alabama Review. He specializes in the history of the Tuskegee Airmen.

Haulman has taught at Huntingdon College, Auburn University Montgomery, and Faulkner University.

== Publications ==
- Tuskegee Airmen and the 'Never Lost a Bomber' Myth (2011) ISBN 9781603061056
- The Tuskegee Airmen: An illustrated History, 1939-1949 (with Joseph Caver and Jerome Ennels) (2011) ISBN 9781588382443
- Tuskegee Airmen Chronology (2012) ISBN 9781477549605
- Eleven Myths About the Tuskegee Airmen (2012) ISBN 9781603061476
- What Hollywood Got Right and Wrong about the Tuskegee Airmen in the Great New Movie, Red Tails (2012) ISBN 9781603061605
- Tuskegee Airmen Questions and Answers for Students (2015) ISBN 9781603063814
- Killing Yamamoto: The American Raid that Avenged Pearl Harbor (2015) ISBN 9781603063876
- Air Force Aerial Victory Credits: WWI, WWII, and Vietnam
- The United States and Air Force and Humanitarian Airlift Operations, 1947-1994
- One Hundred Years of Flight: USAF Chronology of Significant Air and Space Events 1903-2002

== Personal life ==
Haulman is married to Ellen Evans Haulman. She was on the staff for the Alabama Commission on Higher Education. They have one son named Evan, who attended Auburn University, graduated from Huntingdon College and completed graduate school at Samford University. Haulman resides in Montgomery, Alabama.
