= M.J. Hans Taihuttu =

Indonesian footballer

Personal information
- Date of birth: 1909
- Place of birth: Dutch East Indies
- Position: Forward

Senior career*
Years	Team	Apps	(Gls)
- VV Jong Ambon Batavia

International career
- Dutch East Indies
- * Club domestic league appearances and goals

M.J. Hans Taihuttu (born 1909, date of death unknown) was an Indonesian football forward who played for the Dutch East Indies in the 1938 FIFA World Cup. He also played for VV Jong Ambon Batavia. Taihuttu is deceased.
