= Jack Samuels =

Indonesian footballer (1918–2001)

Personal information
- Date of birth: 29 March 1918
- Place of birth: Dutch East Indies
- Date of death: 12 September 2001 (aged 83)
- Place of death: The Hague
- Position: Defender

Senior career*
Years	Team	Apps	(Gls)
- Excelsior Soerabaja

International career
- Dutch East Indies
- * Club domestic league appearances and goals

Jack Kolle (29 March 1918 – 12 September 2001), better known as Jack Samuels, was an Indonesian football defender who played for the Dutch East Indies in the 1938 FIFA World Cup. He also played for Excelsior Soerabaja.
