= Dutch East Indies Championship =

Dutch East Indies city Championship
- Founded: 1914
- Folded: 1950
- Country: Indonesia
- Number of clubs: 7 (in 1914–1929); 11 (in 1930); 3 to 9 (in 1931–1950)
- Last champions: Soerabaja (1950)
- Most championships: Batavia (17)

Dutch East Indies city Championship was a national amateur football competition in Indonesia held between 1914 and 1930 before the formation of Perserikatan, organized by the PSSI, the Indonesian football federation. The tournament originally featured only the four main cities (Batavia, Soerabaja, Semarang, Bandoeng) but by 1930 included many cities from across the island. Competition in the initiated and organized by the Nederlandsch Indische Voetbal Bond (NIVB) or its successor, the Nederlandsch Indische Voetbal Unie (NIVU) before the Football Association of Indonesia (PSSI) is formed.

== History ==
Starting from 1914, there was a city championship for the main cities on Java. The first seven editions were played for the De Vries beker, which was to be kept outright by the first city to win the tournament five times in total or three times in succession, with Batavia fulfilling both conditions simultaneously when they won on enemy territory in 1920. The tournament originally featured only the four main cities (Batavia, Soerabaja, Semarang, Bandoeng) but by 1930 included many cities from across the island.

In addition, there were a number of local leagues, lists the following leagues on Java as being controlled by the NIVB (Nederlandsch-Indische Voetbalbond): Batavia (14 clubs), Bandoeng (9 clubs), Soerabaja (12 clubs), Semarang (15 clubs), Malang (8 clubs), Soekaboemi (7 clubs), Djokjakarta (10 clubs); moreover, 3 associations on other islands were subscribed to the NIVB (renamed NIVU in 1936): East Sumatra (based in Medan), Makassar and Bandjermasin. In addition the Hwa Nan FA (based in Semarang), presumably an ethnic Chinese association, was subscribed.

== List of Dutch East Indies city champions ==
It's the list of the DEI Championship winner since 1914 until 1950.

| Season | Winners | Venue | Reference |
|---|---|---|---|
| 1914 | Batavia | Semarang | |
| 1915 | Batavia | Batavia | |
| 1916 | Soerabaja | Soerabaja | |
| 1917 | Soerabaja | Semarang | |
| 1918 | Batavia | Bandoeng | |
| 1919 | Batavia | Batavia | |
| 1920 | Batavia | Soerabaja | |
| 1921 | Batavia | Semarang | |
| 1922 | Soerabaja | Weltevreden (Batavia) | |
| 1923 | Batavia | Batavia | |
| 1924 | Soerabaja | Soerabaja | |
| 1925 | Batavia | Bandoeng | |
| 1926 | Soerabaja | Semarang | |
| 1927 | Batavia | Batavia | |
| 1928 | Soerabaja | Soerabaja | |
| 1929 | Batavia | Bandoeng | |
| 1930 | Soerabaja | Semarang | |
| 1931 | Soerabaja | Batavia | |
| 1932 | Soerabaja | Soerabaja | |
| 1933 | Batavia | Bandoeng | |
| 1934 | Soerabaja | Semarang | |
| 1934 | Batavia | Batavia | |
| 1935 | Batavia | Batavia | |
| 1936 | Soerabaja | Soerabaja | |
| 1937 | Soerabaja | Bandoeng | |
| 1938 | Batavia | Semarang | |
| 1939 | Batavia | Batavia | |
| 1940 | Batavia | Soerabaja | |
| 1941 | Soerabaja | Bandoeng | |
| 1942-46 | not held | | |
| 1947 | Batavia | Soerabaja | |
| 1948 | Batavia | Semarang | |
| 1949 | Soerabaja | Batavia | |
| 1950 | Soerabaja | Bandoeng | |

== City Championship ==
=== Oost Sumatra ===
==== Eerste Klasse ====
| Season | Winners | Runner-up | Reference |
|---|---|---|---|
| 1907 | Voorwaarts (Medan) | | |
| 1908 | Voorwaarts (Medan) | | |
| 1909 | not known (possibly not held) | | |
| 1910 | Handel (Medan) | | |
| 1911/12 | Handel (Medan) | | |
| 1913 | Handel (Medan) | | |
| 1914 | Van Nie & Co. (Medan) | | |
| 1915 | Pabatoe (Padang-Bedagei district) (Medan champions: Go Ahead) | | |
| 1916 | A.V.V. (Kisaran) (Medan champions: D.S.V.) | | |
| 1917 | D.S.V. (Medan) | | |
| 1918 | Go Ahead (Medan) | | |
| 1919 | Go Ahead (Medan) | | |
| 1920 | D.S.V. (Medan) | | |
| 1921 | Go Ahead (Medan) | | |
| 1922 | Langkat Sportvereeniging (L.S.V.) | Go-Ahead Medansche | |
| 1923 | D.S.V. (Medan) | | |
| 1924 | Go Ahead (Medan) | | |
| 1925 | M.S.V. (Medan) | | |
| 1926 | L.S.V. (Bindjey) | | |
| 1927 | M.S.V. (Medan) | | |
| 1928 | M.S.V. (Medan) | | |
| 1929 | I.V.C. (Medan) | | |
| 1930 | M.S.V. (Medan) | | |
| 1931/32 | C.S.C. (Medan) | | |
| 1932-34 | U.V.V. (Belawan) | | |
| 1935 | U.V.V. (Belawan) (Siantar champions: P.S.V.) | | |
| 1936/37 | P.S.V. (Tebing Tinggi) (Medan champions: Deli Mĳ.) | | |
| 1937/38 | C.S.C. (Pematang Siantar) (Medan champions: M.C.V.C.) | | |
| 1939 | S.S.C. (Pangkalan Brandan) | | |

==== Inlandsche Competitive ====
| Season | Winners | Runner-up | Reference |
|---|---|---|---|
| 1922 | Medansche Sportvereeniging (M.S.V.) | Bataksche Sportvereeniging | |

=== Batavia ===
==== Eerste Klasse ====
| Season | Winners | Runner-up | Reference |
|---|---|---|---|
| 1904 | Vios (Voorwaarts is ons streven) | Oliveo (Onze leus is voorwaarts en overwinnen) | |
| 1904/05 | Oliveo | | |
| 1905/06 | Vios | | |
| 1906/07 | Hercules | | |
| 1907/08 | Vios | | |
| 1908/09 | Vios | | |
| 1909/10 | Vios | | |
| 1910/11 | Vios | | |
| 1911/12 | Oliveo | | |
| 1912 | Vios | | |
| 1912/13 | Vios | | |
| 1914 | Vios | | |
| 1915 | Hercules | | |
| 1916 | Hercules | | |
| 1917 | Hercules | | |
| 1918 | Hercules | | |
| 1919 | Hercules Batavia | Bataviasche Voetbal Club (B.V.C.) | |
| 1920 | Hercules Batavia | Sport Vereeniging Binnenlandsch Bestuur (S.V.B.B.) | |
| 1921/22 | Hercules | | |
| 1922 | Hercules | | |
| 1922/23 | Hercules | | |
| 1923/24 | Hercules | | |
| 1924/25 | Hercules | | |
| 1925/26 | S.V.B.B. | | |
| 1926/27 | Oliveo | | |
| 1927/28 | Hercules | | |
| 1928/29 | S.V.B.B. | | |
| 1929/30 | S.V.B.B. | | |
| 1930/31 | Hercules | | |
| 1931/32 | S.V.B.B. | | |
| 1932/33 | U.M.S. | | |
| 1933/34 | Hercules Batavia | Sport Vereeniging Binnenlandsch Bestuur (S.V.B.B.) | |
| 1934/35 | Hercules | | |
| 1934/35 | Hercules | | |
| 1935/36 | S.V.J.A. | | |
| 1936/37 | S.V.J.A. | | |
| 1937/38 | Hercules | | |
| 1938/39 | B.V.C. | | |
| 1940-45 | not played | | |
| 1946 | B.V.C. | | |
| 1947/48 | U.M.S. | | |

==== Tweede Klasse ====
| Season | Winners | Runner-up | Reference |
|---|---|---|---|
| 1933/34 | Jong Arab | | |

=== Bandoeng ===
==== Eerste Klasse ====
| Season | Winners | Runner-up | Reference |
|---|---|---|---|
| 1915 | U.N.I. | | |
| 1916 | U.N.I. | | |
| 1917 | U.N.I. | | |
| 1918 | U.N.I. | | |
| 1919 | Uitspanning Na Inspanning (U.N.I.) | Sidolig (Sport in de open lucht is gezond) | |
| 1920 | Sparta Bandoeng | Uitspanning Na Inspanning (U.N.I.) | |
| 1921 | U.N.I. | | |
| 1922 | not known | | |
| 1923 | U.N.I. | | |
| 1924 | not known | | |
| 1925 | U.N.I. | | |
| 1926/27 | Sidolig | | |
| 1927/28 | Velocitas (Tjimahi) | | |
| 1928 | U.N.I. | | |
| 1929 | U.N.I. (championship playoff Jan 1930) | | |
| 1930/31 | not known | | |
| 1931/32 | Velocitas (Tjimahi) | | |
| 1932/33 | U.N.I. | | |
| 1933/34 | Sidolig | | |
| 1934/35 | U.N.I. | | |
| 1935/36 | Sparta Bandoeng | | |
| 1936/37 | Sparta Bandoeng | | |
| 1937/38 | U.N.I. | | |
| 1938/39 | U.N.I. | | |

==== Tweede Klasse ====
| Season | Winners | Runner-up | Reference |
|---|---|---|---|
| 1919 | Sparta II | Osvia | |
| 1920 | U.N.I. II | L.U.N.O. II | |

==== Vijfjarig jubileum B.V.B. (Bandoeng Voetbal Bond) ====
| Season | Winners | Score | Runner-up | Reference |
|---|---|---|---|---|
| 1919 | Sidolig | 1-0 | Sparta Bandoeng | |

=== Soekaboemi ===
Eerste Klasse

| Season | Winners | Score | Runner-up | Reference |
|---|---|---|---|---|
| 1933/34 | Y.M.A. | 3-1 | P.V.C. | |

=== Soerabaja ===
==== Eerste Klasse ====
| Season | Winners | Runner-up | Reference |
|---|---|---|---|
| 1902 | T.H.O.R. (beat E.C.A. 1–0 in final) | | |
| 1903-07 | not known | | |
| 1908 | T.H.O.R. | | |
| 1909 | Quick | | |
| 1910 | Quick | | |
| 1911 | Quick | | |
| 1912 | Quick | | |
| 1913 | Quick | | |
| 1914 | H.B.S. | | |
| 1915 | Quick | | |
| 1916 | H.B.S. | | |
| 1917 | H.B.S. | | |
| 1918 | H.B.S. | | |
| 1918/19 | T.H.O.R. | | |
| 1919/20 | T.H.O.R. | | |
| 1920/21 | T.H.O.R. | | |
| 1921 | Excelsior | | |
| 1922 | H.B.S. | | |
| 1923 | H.B.S. | | |
| 1924 | H.B.S. | | |
| 1925 | H.B.S. | | |
| 1926/27 | Excelsior | | |
| 1927/28 | Excelsior | | |
| 1928 | T.H.O.R. | | |
| 1929 | Tiong Hoa | | |
| 1930 | Excelsior | | |
| 1931/32 | T.H.O.R. | | |
| 1932/33 | Excelsior | | |
| 1933/34 | Tiong Hoa | | |
| 1934 | Tiong Hoa | | |
| 1934/35 | T.H.O.R. | | |
| 1935 | T.H.O.R. | | |
| 1935/36 | H.B.S. | | |
| 1936/37 | H.B.S. | | |
| 1937/38 | H.B.S. | | |
| 1938/39 | Tiong Hoa | | |
| 1939-48 | not known | | |
| 1948/49 | Tiong Hoa | | |
