= October 1914 =

Month of 1914

<<	October 1914					>>
Su	Mo	Tu	We	Th	Fr	Sa
				1	2	3
4	5	6	7	8	9	10
11	12	13	14	15	16	17
18	19	20	21	22	23	24
25	26	27	28	29	30	31

The following events occurred in October 1914:

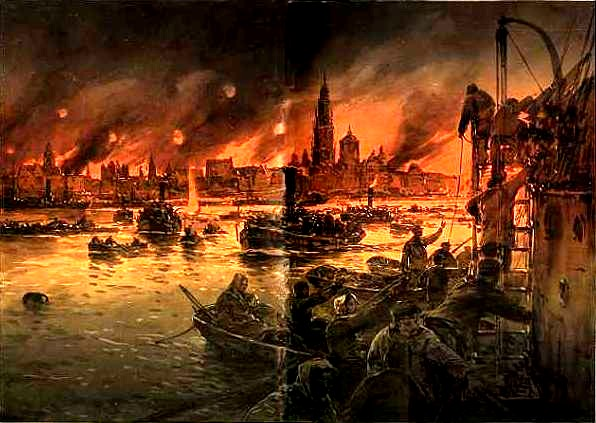
Belgian and British soldiers trying to reach the Netherlands by boat during the Siege of Antwerp. Painting by Willy Stöwer.

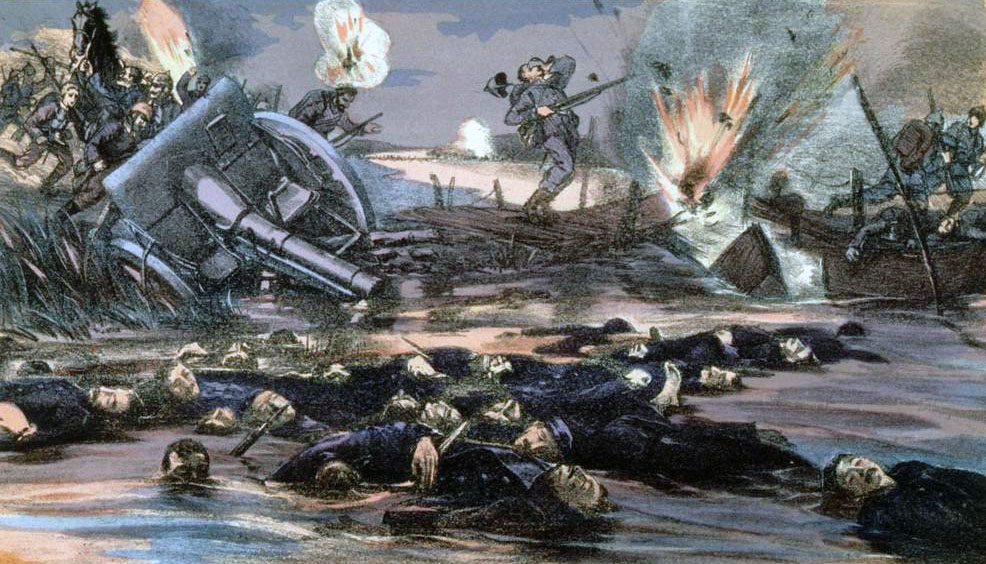
Fallen Belgian troops during the Battle of the Yser.

== October 1, 1914 (Thursday) ==
- The Battle of Arras began when General Louis de Maud'huy ordered troops with the French Tenth Army to attack German forces southeast of Arras and Lens in northern France, but vastly underestimated the strength of the German forces positioned there.
- Mexican revolutionary leader Venustiano Carranza called on all other revolutionary leaders to meet for convention in Mexico City in what was perceived as "the last attempt to create unity among the revolutionaries."
- Former Canadian Labor Minister and future Prime Minister William Lyon Mackenzie King, who had been a director for the Rockefeller Foundation since June, was assigned by the American business family to head an inquiry into the Colorado mine strike that resulted in violence and dozens of deaths earlier in 1914, particularly at Ludlow.
- The 6th Regiment of the Royal Horse Artillery merged with the 4th Regiment Royal Artillery.
- The Southern Line of the State Railway of Thailand was extended in the Nakhon Si Thammarat Province, Thailand, with stations Khao Chum Thong Junction serving the line.
- The Billinge Green rail station opened in Davenham, England.
- The rail station in Pontygwaith, Wales, was closed.
- The Kiever Synagogue was established in Toronto.
- The one-mile oval Bowie Race Track was opened for horse racing outside of Bowie, Maryland by the Southern Maryland Agricultural Society.
- The Edward VII Monument, designed by Louis-Philippe Hébert, was unveiled at Phillips Square in Montreal by Edward's brother Prince Arthur, who was then the Governor General of Canada. Edward had visited Montreal in 1860, when he was the Prince of Wales, to open the Victoria Bridge.
- British mathematician Edgar Buckingham introduced the use of the symbol "π_{i}" for the dimensionless variables (or parameters) in what becomes known as the Buckingham π theorem, significant to dimensional analysis.
- Born:
  - Daniel J. Boorstin, American historian, 12th Librarian of Congress; in Atlanta, United States (d. 2004)
  - Marvin Gay Sr., American religious leader and murderer, father to R&B music artist Marvin Gaye and his killer; in Jessamine County, Kentucky, United States (d. 1998)
  - Lê Trọng Tấn, Vietnamese military officer, Chief of General Staff for the People's Army of Vietnam from 1975 to 1986; as Lê Trọng Tố, in Hoài Đức District, Tonkin (present-day Vietnam) (d. 1986)
- Died: Kitty Lange Kielland, 70, Norwegian painter, best known for her landscapes of Jæren in southern Norway (b. 1843)

== October 2, 1914 (Friday) ==
- Battle of Arras — French forces gave up Douai in northern France after the German reserve units staged a successful counterattack.
- William Howard Hearst became Premier of Ontario, succeeding James Whitney who died suddenly on September 25.
- Violent fallout from the Komagata Maru incident continued in India when Sikh passengers of the Japanese vessel refused orders to board a train from Calcutta to Punjab and opened fire, killing one police officer and wounding several others. British troops opened fire and killed 16 Sikhs and arrested dozens more.
- Porto Velho was established as the capital of Rondônia, Brazil.
- Born: Jack Parsons, American rocket engineer, one of the founders of the Jet Propulsion Laboratory and the Aerojet in California; as Marvin Whiteside Parsons, in Los Angeles, United States (killed in an explosion, 1952)

== October 3, 1914 (Saturday) ==
- Battle of Arras — The French line held against the German advance on Arras.
- German and Austro-Hungarian forces clashed in what is now southwestern Poland. Russian forces had been ordered to pull back but only the cavalry obeyed, leaving behind an infantry group that believed it could hold its position. They were destroyed the next day, with 7,000 Russian troops captured.
- Forces under command of Essad Pasha Toptani took Durrës, the capital of Albania, with no resistance.
- The Port Adelaide Football Club defeated the Carlton Football Club to be crowned Champions of Australia for a record fourth time and becoming the only League club in Australian football to go through its entire season undefeated.
- The New Athletic Field for Mississippi State University opened for its first game, the fourth oldest college stadium in the United States.
- The Green Line of the Boylston Street subway in Boston opened stations Copley and Massachusetts.

== October 4, 1914 (Sunday) ==
- An earthquake measuring 7.0 on the surface-wave magnitude scale shook Lake Burdur in southwestern Turkey, causing an estimated 4,000 deaths and destroying more than 17,000 homes.
- The Canadian Expeditionary Force of 31,000 men set off to Great Britain in 31 ocean liners, arriving in Plymouth Sound, England, within a week.
- Battle of Arras — The French Tenth Army failed to hold back the German advance and lost Lens in northern France.
- The Manifesto of the Ninety-Three was proclaimed in Germany, in which 93 prominent German scientists, scholars and artists signed a document declaring their unequivocal support of German military actions in the early period of World War I. While the document galvanized public support in Germany, it was met with outrage by the international intellectual community, especially since it came after reports of atrocities committed by occupying German forces in Belgium in August.
- U.S. President Woodrow Wilson declared a national day of prayer throughout the United States for the end of World War I.
- The Northern Group of the French Army was established.
- The Baltic Exhibition closed in Malmö, Sweden, four days after its official closing date of September 30.
- Canoga Park High School opened to students in Canoga Park, California.
- Born: Jim Cairns, Australian politician, Deputy Prime Minister of Australia from 1974 to 1975; as James Cairns, in Carlton, Victoria, Australia (d. 2003)

== October 5, 1914 (Monday) ==
- Essad Pasha Toptani became the fourth Prime Minister of Albania and formed the fifth cabinet of Albania.
- Winston Churchill visited government officials in Antwerp with the Royal Marines Brigade where he offered to resign from his position as First Lord of the Admiralty to take command of the newly formed Royal Navy Division and help with defending Belgium from the German invasion. Although the offer was supported by Field Marshal Herbert Kitchener, the British cabinet rejected it.
- A mine explosion killed 16 near Birmingham, Alabama.
- Sergeant Joseph Frantz and Corporal Louis Quenault of the Armée de l'Air Française were the first aviators in history to shoot down another aircraft with gunfire, downing a German Aviatik fighter plane with machine gun fire from their Voisin aircraft over Jonchery, Reims.
- The Sekihoku railroad opened in Kitami, Hokkaido, Japan, with stations Ponmuka serving the line.
- The first session of Loyola University New Orleans College of Law was held in the College of the Immaculate Conception in New Orleans.
- Ethel Barrymore made her screen debut in the drama The Nightingale, written by American playwright Augustus Thomas, who was a close friend to Ethel's father Maurice Barrymore. The film has long been considered lost.
- Died: Albert Solomon, 38, Australian politician, 23rd Premier of Tasmania; of tuberculosis (b. 1876)

== October 6, 1914 (Tuesday) ==
- Joseph Kennedy married Rose Fitzgerald in Boston.
- The first Sopwith Gunbus airplane was given a test flight in England.
- British singer Mark Sheridan released the first recording of the hit World War I song "Belgium Put the Kibosh on the Kaiser".
- The city of Dunn Center, North Dakota was established.
- Born:
  - Thor Heyerdahl, Norwegian explorer, leader of the Kon-Tiki expedition; in Larvik, Norway (d. 2002)
  - Leonida Bagration, Russian noble, consort to Grand Duke Vladimir Kirillovich; in Tiflis, Caucasus Viceroyalty, Russian Empire (present-day Tbilisi, Georgia) (d. 2010)

== October 7, 1914 (Wednesday) ==
- Battle of Jabassi — British forces launched an unsuccessful attack against German defenses dug in at the village of Jabassi on the Wuri River in German Cameroon.
- The Quiches District was established in Sihuas Province, Peru.
- Born:
  - Begum Akhtar, Indian singer of Hindustani classical music; as Akhtari Bai Faizabadi, in Faizabad, United Provinces of Agra and Oudh, British India (present-day Uttar Pradesh, India) (d. 1974)
  - Josef František, Czech air force pilot, member of the No. 303 Polish Squadron during World War II, three-time recipient of the Cross of Valour and Distinguished Flying Medal; in Otaslavice, Austria-Hungary (present-day Czech Republic) (killed in action, 1940)

== October 8, 1914 (Thursday) ==
- In a raid planned by Royal Naval Air Service Wing Commander Charles Samson, two Sopwith Tabloids attacked the Zeppelin sheds at Düsseldorf and the Cologne railway station. Flight Lieutenant Reginald Marix was able to destroy Zeppelin Z IX by bombing the hangar it was held in, the first time that an aircraft destroyed an airship.
- The popular World War I patriot song "Keep the Home Fires Burning", composed by Ivor Novello with lyrics by Lena Guilbert Ford, was published with the original title "'Til the Boys Come Home" by Ascherberg, Hopwood and Crew Ltd. in London. The song was re-titled to its current name in 1915.
- Born:
  - William A. Egan, American politician, first and fourth Governor of Alaska; in Valdez, Territory of Alaska, United States (present-day Alaska) (d. 1984)
  - Rowland Wolfe, American gymnast, gold medalist at the 1932 Summer Olympics; as Merrill Rowland Wolfe, in Dallas, United States (d. 2010)
- Died: Adelaide Crapsey, 36, American poet, known for her poetry collection Verses published posthumously (b. 1878)

== October 9, 1914 (Friday) ==
Bomb damage in Antwerp.

- Siege of Antwerp — Finding no resistance from the defending fortresses around Antwerp, German commanding officer Hans Hartwig von Beseler ceased bombardment and called on Belgian General Victor Deguise to surrender. However, four civilian representatives, including the Mayor of Antwerp Jan De Vos, met with Beseler beforehand to request an end to the bombardment of the city and signed a capitulation. The document forced Deguise to accept the terms a day later and surrender along with 30,000 Allied troops. German troops occupied the city until the end of World War I.
- Battle of the Vistula River — German forces arrived at Vistula River but found little resistance on the river's west bank. General Nikolai Ruzsky, commander of the Russian Northwest Front, sent troops from Warsaw to attack the German's left flank, but the Germans knew of the army's strength from orders found on the body of a Russian officer. They knew three Russian armies would concentrate against the German Ninth Army to relieve pressure on the Austro-Hungarian line in the south.
- A German airplane appeared over Lille, France, and dropped two bombs on the city's post office. By the afternoon, all men of fighting age were ordered to leave Lille immediately, while civilians in the surrounding towns and villages were evacuated.
- The IV Corps of the British Army was established, with John French in command.
- The Torrens Island Concentration Camp opened on Torrens Island south of Adelaide, Australia, to house 400 German and Austro-Hungarian prisoners of war.
- The Orpheum Theatre opened in Champaign, Illinois as a live vaudeville theater. It is now the site of the Orpheum Children's Science Museum.
- Born: Joseph L. Melnick, American medical scientist, lead breakthrough research in how polio was spread; in Boston, United States (d. 2001)
- Died: Dumitru C. Moruzi, 64, Romanian writer, member of the Sămănătorul group (b. 1850)

== October 10, 1914 (Saturday) ==
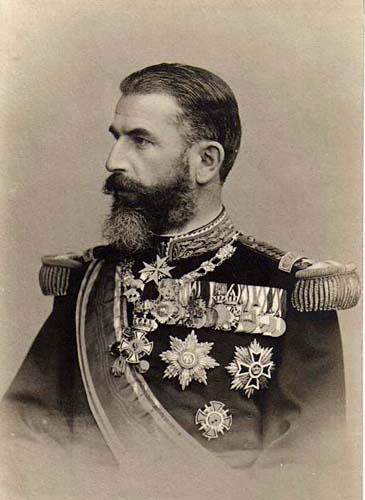
Carol I of Romania.

- Battle of La Bassée - British and French soldiers attempted to recover the northern French city of La Bassée from occupying German forces.
- The last train left Lille, France, at dawn, an hour after German artillery began to fire on the station, the city's main government building and the famous Palais des Beaux-Arts de Lille. The barrage continued for another two days.
- Mexican revolutionary leaders Pancho Villa, Venustiano Carranza and Álvaro Obregón met at the Convention of Aguascalientes in Mexico to discuss future governance of the nation after deposing Mexican president Victoriano Huerta in July. Revolutionary leader Emiliano Zapata delayed attending the meeting until 15 days later.
- Romanian King Carol I died and was succeeded by his nephew Ferdinand. Carol opposed the country entering the World War I because of close relations with Germany, but Ferdinand was in favor and formally sided with the Allies in 1916.
- The German cruiser SMS Emden left Diego Garcia, a British-held atoll in the Indian Ocean after ten days of rest and maintenance. Due to its isolation, the inhabitants were still not aware World War I had started and were unknowingly harboring an enemy vessel, an oversight the German crew took full advantage of.
- The American schooner Alma A. E. Holmes collided with the steamer Belfast in thick fog off the coast of Marblehead, Massachusetts and sank, with all crew rescued.
- The 10th Light Horse Regiment of the First Australian Imperial Force was established.
- The 38th Welsh Infantry Division of the British Army was established.
- The Boorowa railway line opened between Boorowa and Galong, New South Wales, Australia.
- East Fremantle defeated South Fremantle 43-24 to win its ninth West Australian State Premiership.
- The Spanish opera Margot, composed by Joaquín Turina, debuted at the Teatro de la Zarzuela in Madrid.
- Died:
  - Gijsbert van Tienhoven, 73, Dutch politician, 21st Prime Minister of the Netherlands (b. 1841)
  - Johan Jacob Ahrenberg, 67, Finnish architect, designed major public buildings including the Reserve Officer School in Hamina, Finland (b. 1847)

== October 11, 1914 (Sunday) ==
- Battle of Flirey — French forces abandoned attempts to retake the village of Saint-Mihiel in northeastern France from German forces, who were now too entrenched to be moved, thus ending the battle. The village would not be retaken until 1918.
- The German submarine SM U-26 torpedoed and sank the Russian cruiser Pallada in the Gulf of Finland off Osmussaar, Estonia with the loss of all 597 crew. It was the first warship Russia lost during World War I.
- More than 100,000 visitors attended the final day of the Jubilee Exhibition in Oslo.
- Brown University celebrated its 150th anniversary as a post-secondary institution. Among the many official dignitaries that attended included:
  - Former U.S. President William Howard Taft
  - Steel magnate Andrew Carnegie
  - Standard Oil executive John D. Rockefeller Jr.
  - Librarian of Congress Herbert Putnam
  - New York, New Haven and Hartford Railroad president Howard Elliott
  - Brown University president William Faunce
  - Columbia University president Nicholas Murray Butler
  - Cornell University president Jacob Gould Schurman
  - Princeton University president John Grier Hibben
  - Yale University president Arthur Twining Hadley
  - University of California president Benjamin Ide Wheeler
  - Amherst College president Alexander Meiklejohn
  - Bowdoin College president William De Witt Hyde
  - Mount Holyoke College president Mary Emma Woolley
- Association football club Frigg defeated Gjøvik-Lyn 4-2 to win the Norwegian Cup.
- The association football club Norbergs was established in Norberg, Sweden.
- Born:
  - J. Edward Day, American public servant, 55th United States Postmaster General who introduced the ZIP Code system to United States Postal Service; as James Edward Day, in Jacksonville, Illinois, United States (d. 1996)
  - Reuben Fine, American chess player, seven-time winner of the U.S. Open Chess Championship and five-time medalist at Chess Olympiad; in New York City, United States (d. 1993)
- Died: Aida Overton Walker, 34, American dancer and choreographer, known for her collaborations with Bert Williams; from kidney failure (b. 1880)

== October 12, 1914 (Monday) ==
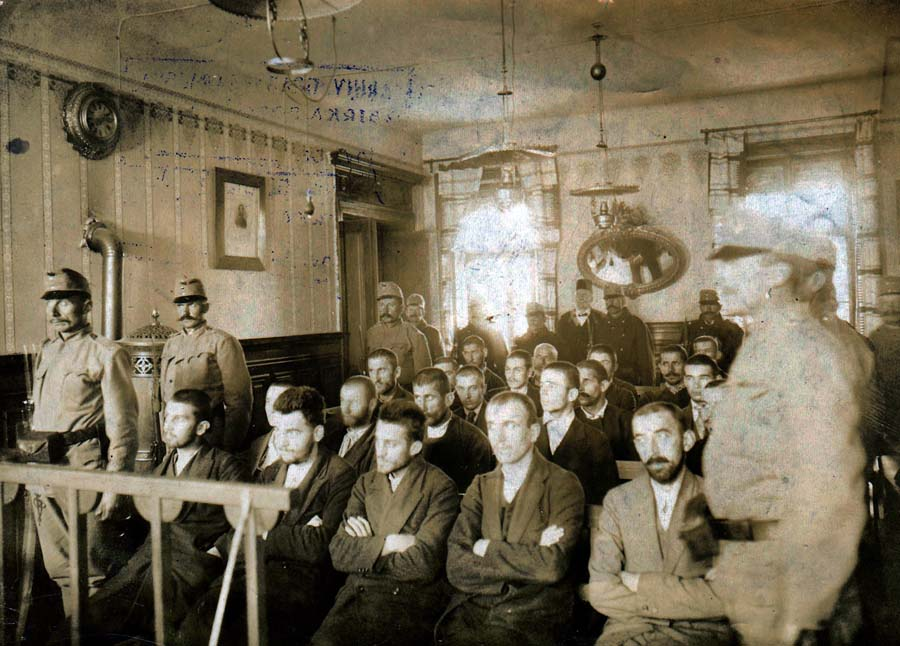
Gavrilo Princip (first row centre) appears before court in Sarajevo for the assassination of Archduke Franz Ferdinand of Austria.

- German forces took control of Ghent, Belgium, with little resistance, allowing the city to escape much of the destruction from World War I.
- Battle of Messines — French and British soldiers advanced on the German defense line in French portion of Flanders, capturing the town of Mont des Cats in the process.
- The German barrage on Lille, France, ended with troops entering the city. In all, the barrage killed 80 civilians, destroyed the railway station, and set parts of the city on fire.
- Maritz rebellion — The Union of South Africa declared martial law in response to a Boer uprising that included 12,000 rebel soldiers under command of general Manie Maritz, Christiaan de Wet and Christian Frederick Beyers.
- The trial for 17 of the conspirators in the assassination of Archduke Franz Ferdinand began in Sarajevo. Gavrilo Princip, the Serbian student who fired the fatal shots, admitted in court his motivation for assassination was purely political: "I am a Yugoslav nationalist and I believe in unification of all South Slavs in whatever form of state and that it be free of Austria ... By means of terror."
- British naval officer Horace Hood became Commander-in-Chief of the Royal Navy in Dover.
- The British captured one of the colliers the German cruiser SMS Emden relied on for coal supplies.
- The Royal Navy destroyer Manly was launched from the Scotstoun shipyard in Glasgow to serve in the Harwich Force assigned to defend the English Channel.
- Died: Margaret E. Knight, 76, American inventor, first noted female American inventor with nearly a dozen patents to her name (b. 1838)

== October 13, 1914 (Tuesday) ==
- The Battle of Armentières began in northern France, with soldiers with the British Expeditionary Force advancing to find Germans dug in and well-defended.
- Battle of La Bassée — British forces nearly lost Givenchy in northeastern France when Germany troops attacked them during the rainstorm, with the British losing c. 1,000 casualties.
- The Imperial Japanese Navy attempted air-to-air combat for the first time, as a naval airplane joined three Imperial Japanese Army airplanes in an attempt to attack a German reconnaissance plane during the Siege of Tsingtao. However, the German aircraft escaped.
- The Boston Braves defeated the Philadelphia Athletics in all four games to win the World Series.
- Chemical manufacturer Wacker Chemie was established in Munich.
- The Algoma Central Railway, building northward from Sault Ste. Marie, opened its northernmost section between Oba and Hearst, Ontario.
- A 33-pound (15 kg) iron meteorite hit the ground near Appley Bridge, England.
- Born: Frankie Hayes, American baseball player, catcher for the Philadelphia Athletics, St. Louis Browns, Cleveland Indians, Chicago White Sox, and Boston Red Sox from 1933 to 1947; as Franklin Hayes, in Jamesburg, New Jersey, United States (d. 1955)
- Died: Walter Withers, 59, Australian landscape artist, member of the Heidelberg School of Australian impressionists (b. 1854)

== October 14, 1914 (Wednesday) ==
- Battle of La Bassée — British soldiers and French cavalry attacked German defenses on a canal leading to La Bassée but lost 967 casualties when action wrapped the following day.
- Battle of Armentières — German forces regrouped behind the river Lys in northeastern France and waited for the German 4th and 6th armies to organize in Belgium, giving the town of Bailleul back to the Allies.
- Battle of Messines — Allied troops and cavalry closed the last gaps in the offensive and put the German armies on the defense.
- Battle of Jabassi — British forces launched a second attack and succeeded in capturing Jabassi, German Cameroon.
- The Dover Town rail station closed in Dover, England, as part as part of efforts to modernize the South Eastern and Chatham Railway.
- Student Jewish fraternity Phi Alpha was founded at George Washington University. It merged with Phi Sigma Delta in 1959.
- Port Adelaide defeated South Australia by 58 points during an exhibition game at the Jubilee Oval in Adelaide, Australia. Even though it was not part of the official season, the win clinched a perfect season for Port Adelaide.
- Born: Raymond Davis Jr., American physicist, recipient of the Nobel Prize in Physics for his research with neutrinos; in Washington D.C., United States (d. 2006)
- Died: Hubert Hamilton, British army officer, noted commander in the Mahdist War, Second Boer War and World War I, recipient of the Order of the Bath and Royal Victorian Order, first British division commander to be killed in action; killed in action at La Couture (b. 1861)

== October 15, 1914 (Thursday) ==
- HMS Hawke was torpedoed by the German submarine SM U-9 in the North Sea and sank in less than ten minutes with the loss of 524 lives.
- The German cruiser SMS Emden captured a British steamer in the Indian Ocean and sank her the next day. Over the next five days, she captured five more vessels and used one of them as a collier.
- The U.S. government enacted the Clayton Antitrust Act which sought to prevent anti-competitive practices in their incipiency.
- Singer Beniamino Gigli made his stage debut at Rovigo in the Amilcare Ponchielli opera La Gioconda.
- A. A. Milne's collection of short stories for Punch magazine were published in the anthology Once a Week.
- Born:
  - Mohammed Zahir Shah, Afghan noble, last Emir of Afghanistan; in Kabul, Emirate of Afghanistan (present-day Afghanistan) (d. 2007)
  - Lim Yew Hock, Singaporean politician, second Chief Minister of Singapore; in Singapore in the Straits Settlements (present-day Singapore) (d. 1984)

== October 16, 1914 (Friday) ==
- Battle of the Yser — Belgian and French troops under Colonel Alphonse Jacques successfully defended the Belgian town of Dixmude against the advancing German army despite heavy losses. Jacques' leadership during the day's battle became so respected he was later awarded the title of Baron with the Belgian nobility.
- Battle of La Bassée — British troops sustained another 1,000 casualties as they advanced to Aubers in northeastern France, but managed to recapture Givenchy from the Germans.
- Battle of Armentières — British forces secured the Lys river crossings while the German focused their attacks further north at Dixmude.
- Italian Foreign Minister Antonino Paternò Castello died and was succeeded by Sidney Sonnino, who continued to follow the negotiating strategy set by his predecessor which lead to the secret Treaty of London in 1915.
- The main body of the New Zealand Expeditionary Force, which included 8,000 troops, finally departed from New Zealand for Australia where they joined up with the First Australian Imperial Force, including the New Zealand Mounted Rifles Brigade which was composed of the Auckland, Canterbury, Otago, and Wellington Mounted Rifles Regiments.
- The 2nd Indian Cavalry Division of the British Army was established.
- Born: Charles Catterall, South African boxer, silver medalist at the 1936 Summer Olympics; in South Africa (d. 1966)

== October 17, 1914 (Saturday) ==
- Battle of La Bassée — British forces captured Violaines and gained a foothold on Aubers Ridge while French cavalry captured Fromelles from the Germans in northeastern France.
- Battle of Armentières — French forces recaptured Armentières.
- A German torpedo boat sunk the Japanese cruiser Takachiho with the loss of 271 officers and sailors. With only three survivors of the disaster, it was the largest single loss for Japanese forces for all of World War I.
- Battle off Texel — The Imperial German Navy lost an entire torpedo squadron as it tried to lay mines in shipping lanes at the mouth of the River Thames, including 218 sailors killed and 30 taken prisoner.
- While searching for survivors during the aftermath of Battle off Texel, the German hospital ship Ophelia was seized, even though war conventions stipulated for navies never to do so. The Royal Navy justified the seizure as coded radio messages were monitored coming from the ship, the ship's wireless was destroyed, and the crew was observed throwing documents overboard. The ship was renamed SS Huntley.
- Pancho Villa ordered his troops to attack a garrison loyal to Álvaro Obregón at Naco, Sonora, Mexico. The siege lasted 119 days, the longest sustained battle in the Mexican Revolution, before it ended with Villa's forces withdrawing.
- The Royal Naval Air Service established naval air squadrons No. 201 and No. 202 to provide air support on the Western Front.
- The American passenger ship SS Northern Pacific was launched by William Cramp & Sons from Philadelphia and was to go into service by March 1915. She was acquired by the United States Shipping Board in 1917 for military service after the United States entered World War I.
- The fourth city hall for Dallas was completed. It was designated a Dallas Landmark in 1982.
- The village of Chicago Ridge, Illinois was incorporated.
- Born: Jerry Siegel, American comic book author, co-creator of Superman with Joe Shuster; as Jerome Siegel, in Cleveland, United States (d. 1996)

== October 18, 1914 (Sunday) ==
- Battle of the Yser — A German offensive overran Allied troops from the coastal town of Nieuwpoort, Belgium south to Arras in France.
- Battle of La Bassée — The Imperial German Army received reinforcements and slowed the British advance.
- Battle of Armentières — French and British forces attacked German defenses in the Lys river valley. The Germans gave up part of a valley ridge but forced the remaining Allied troops to dig in.
- Battle of Messines — The Allied advance against Germany halted near Messines. The French cavalry, which had done most of the advancing against the Germans, sustained around c. 175 casualties.
- Battle of the Vistula River — Germany called on Austria-Hungary to provide reinforcements to hold a line German lines at Vistula River west of Warsaw, but Austria-Hungarian commanders did not want their troops mingling with the Germans and instead offered to cover the German line's right flank to free up extra German troops. Unfortunately, the Austrian-Hungarian troops came too late to deliver a needed counterattack against the three Russian armies attacking the lines, allowing Russian troops to cross the river.
- The British Royal Navy's Grand Fleet took shelter in Lough Swilly while Scapa Flow was secured against submarine attack.
- The British submarine HMS E3 was torpedoed and sunk by the German submarine SM U-27 in the North Sea, with all 28 of its crew lost. It was first recorded incident in which a naval submarine sank another.
- Benito Mussolini, chief editor of the socialist newspaper Avanti!, declared in favor of intervention on the side of the Triple Entente, and was subsequently expelled from the Italian Socialist Party.
- The 1st Field Artillery Battery of Australia was mobilized for operations in Egypt.
- The Goethe University Frankfurt was established in Frankfurt.
- The Yodo Railroad was established to connect Shimanto and Uwajima, Japan, with stations Chikanaga, Fukata, Futana, Miyanoshita, Muden, and Ōuchi serving the line.
- The Clare Gaelic football club won their first All-Ireland Senior Hurling Championship title, beating Laois 2-4 and 1-2 in the final at Croke Park in Dublin.
- The first mass was held in the Cathedral Basilica after it was officially dedicated by the city of St. Louis, Missouri.

== October 19, 1914 (Monday) ==
- The First Battle of Ypres began as German, French and British forces advanced to encounter each other at the western Belgian town of Langemark.
- The Race to the Sea effectively ended with the start of the First Battle of Ypres, with the Western Front reaching the Belgian coast.
- Battle of La Bassée — British infantry and French cavalry captured Le Pilly (now Herlies) in northeastern France but were forced to retire by German artillery-fire.
- Portuguese forces intercepted a German military column crossing the border between Angola and German South West Africa illegally, resulting in a violent dispute at the town of Naulila that left three German officers dead.
- The 28th Indian Brigade of the British Indian Army was established.
- Born: Harold Gimblett, English cricketer, batsman for the England cricket team from 1936 to 1939 and Somerset County Cricket Club from 1935 to 1954; in Bicknoller, England (d. 1978)
- Died:
  - Julio Argentino Roca, 71, Argentine state leader, 14th President of Argentina (b. 1843)
  - Robert Hugh Benson, 42, British clergy, Anglican priest who converted to Catholicism, author of apocalyptic novel Lord of the World which has been read by several Popes; from pneumonia (b. 1871)

== October 20, 1914 (Tuesday) ==
- Battle of La Bassée — Two fresh army divisions reinforced German defenses, forcing advancing British forces to dig in. That decision narrowly forestalled a German counter-offensive which was to commence that same day.
- Battle of Armentières — German cavalry was reorganized on the river Lys to pin down the forces in front of them while infantry attacked the flank and rear of the opposing forces at Ennetières, France. After initial setbacks, German troops broke through and captured the town as well as Prémesques further north. German artillery began to bombard Armentières and force many Allied troops to withdraw.
- First Battle of Edea — British and French colonial troops began their assault on German forces stationed at Edéa in German Cameroon.
- The British ocean liner HMS Princess Irene was launched by William Denny and Brothers in Dumbarton, Scotland, for the Canadian Pacific Railway, but was recommissioned by the Royal Navy as a minelayer.
- British cargo ship Glitra was stopped in the North Sea off the coast of Norway by German submarine SM U-17 where she was searched under prize rules and her crew allowed to take to the lifeboats before she was scuttled.
- The Coat of arms of London County Council were registered by the College of Arms.
- The Roman Catholic Diocese of Crato was established in Crato, Ceará, Brazil.
- Born:
  - James C. Floyd, British-Canadian aerospace engineer, chief design engineer for Avro Canada; in Manchester, England (date of death unknown)
  - Fayard Nicholas, American dancer, partnered with brother Harold to form the Nicholas Brothers tap dance duo during the Harlem Renaissance; in Mobile, Alabama, United States (d. 2006)

== October 21, 1914 (Wednesday) ==
- First Battle of Ypres — Soldiers from the Fourth and Sixth German Armies attacked Allied forces from the Belgium towns of Armentières, Messines and Langemark.
- Battle of La Bassée — Germans troops attacked the Allied defensive line through a mist early morning, and managed to break a gap in line through the element of surprise. But as the mist lifted later, British reserves were able to organize a counterattack which retook most of the lost trenches. However, the British sustained some 1,079 casualties. A reserve trench line was dug to ensure Allied defenses would hold to future counterattacks by the Germans.
- Battle of Armentières — German forces gained then lost the trench system at Le Gheer, but were able to bombard and capture the village of Le Maisnil.
- Battle of the Yser — Germans forces were able to establish a small bridgehead on the west bank of the Yser River in Belgium, but were still not able to take Dixmude.
- John Scaddan barely held onto his seat as Premier of Western Australia in the state elections. The state government became minority when a lost a seat due to a resignation the following year, would be defeated in 1916.
- Komagata Maru incident — Immigration officer William C. Hopkinson was shot dead in a Vancouver provincial courthouse by Mewa Singh, a member of the city's Sikh community, just before Hopkinson was to testify in a trial hearing. Singh shot the officer in retaliation for testimony he gave the day before at the trial of Ram Singh for the murder of Argun Singh (who was shot dead in front of his home on September 3) which resulted in the defendant's acquittal. Hopkinson's murder was the fifth in a bloody feud that erupted in Vancouver's Sikh community between supporters and detractors of the British Columbia government's decision in May to bar the Japanese vessel SS Komagata Maru carrying hundreds of British Indian citizens from docking at a Canadian port.
- The state BTH Bank chain was established in Quitman, Texas.
- Born: Martin Gardner, American mathematician and writer, creator of the popular Mathematical Games columns in Scientific American from 1956 to 1981; in Tulsa, Oklahoma, United States (d. 2010)

== October 22, 1914 (Thursday) ==
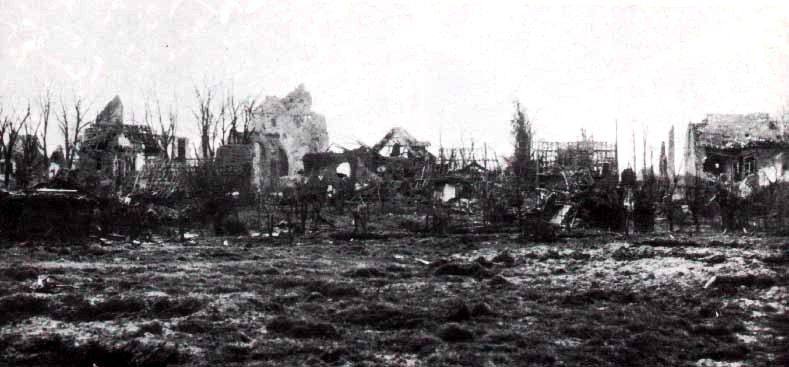
Langemark, Belgium, after German capture.

- First Battle of Ypres — German forces capture the Belgium town of Langemark.
- Battle of La Bassée — German troops forced the British out of Violaines in northeastern France.
- Battle of Armentières — Germany resumed renewed attacks on the Allied line over the next three days but failed to make any significant breakthroughs.
- The Brady Theater in Tulsa, Oklahoma opened to the public, and was listed in the National Register of Historic Places in 1979.

== October 23, 1914 (Friday) ==
- First Battle of Ypres — British and French forces managed to close gaps in the defense line and impede the German offensive in western Belgium.
- Trial hearings for the assassination of Archduke Franz Ferdinand wrapped in Sarajevo, with the court dismissing the defendants' claims that official Serbia was blameless. In a verdict that ran five days later: "The court regards it as proved by the evidence that both the Serbian intelligence and military circles in the Kingdom of Serbia in charge of the espionage service, collaborated in the outrage."
- Italian forces occupied the port city of Vlorë, or Avlona as they called it, in response to plans by Greece to occupy southern Albania following the dissolving of the Autonomous Republic of Northern Epirus.
- The Northwestern Pacific Railroad was completed, connecting Humboldt County, California to the United States rail network.
- German noble Ernest Augustus, Duke of Brunswick established the War Merit Cross that could be awarded for exemplary military service to any rank in the Imperial German Army. The last medal was awarded in 1918.
- Russian theater actor and director Yevgeny Vakhtangov began teaching acting, drama and the theatrical arts and newly college of drama known as Mansurova School for the street where it was established. It was later renamed Vakhtangove School in 1917 after the professor and then its present name Boris Shchukin Theatre Institute in 1939 after its most famous student. The college is still active.
- The city of Pinellas Park, Florida was incorporated.
- Born: Bruiser Kinard, American football player and coach, tackle for the Brooklyn Dodgers and New York Yankees from 1946 to 1947, coach for the Ole Miss Rebels football team from 1948 to 1970; as Frank Manning Kinard, in Pelahatchie, Mississippi, United States (d. 1985)
- Died: José Evaristo Uriburu, 82, Argentine state leader, 13th President of Argentina (b. 1831)

== October 24, 1914 (Saturday) ==
- First Battle of Ypres — German attacked the Allies at Gheluvelt, Belgium.
- Battle of Armentières — Soldiers from the Sixth Germany Army attempted to overrun French defenses on the main canal leading to the Lys river. French brigades held off the attack for 48 hours until withdrawing with a loss of 585 casualties.
- Maritz rebellion — Regular troops with the Union of South Africa defeated the main rebel Boer army under command of General Manie Maritz, forcing him to flee to Germany.
- Italian opera singer Adelina Patti gave her final public performance at a Red Cross concert for the benefit of World War I veterans, at Royal Albert Hall in London.
- Palmer Stadium officially opened as the home field for the Princeton Tigers football team in Princeton, New Jersey. It eventually closed in 1996 and demolished for the current Princeton Stadium.
- Born: František Čapek, Czech canoeist, gold medalist at the 1948 Summer Olympics; in Branice, Kingdom of Bohemia, Austria-Hungary (present-day Poland) (d. 2008)

== October 25, 1914 (Sunday) ==
- Federal elections were held in Switzerland, with the Free Democratic Party of Switzerland retaining its majority in the National Council.
- Erich von Falkenhayn replaced Helmuth von Moltke as German Chief of Staff.
- Ottoman War Minister Enver Pasha ordered Vice-Admiral Wilhelm Souchon to mobilize his ships in the Black Sea and attack the Russian fleet "if a suitable opportunity presented itself".
- First Battle of Ypres — German attacks pushed further attacks on the south flank of the Allied line and nearly punched through the following day, until Allied reserves stopped the gap and prevented a full rout.
- Battle of La Bassée — British, French and German infantry fought hand-to-hand as the Germans try to overrun the Allied trenches, but were eventually forced out by reinforcements. Many of the attacking German soldiers were killed or captured.
- Italian rider Lauro Bordin won the 10th Giro di Lombardia bicycle race in Lombardy, Italy.
- Born: John Berryman, American poet, best known for his poetry collection The Dream Songs; as John Allyn Smith Jr., in McAlester, Oklahoma, United States (d. 1972)
- Died: Charles W. H. Douglas, 64, British Army general, Chief of the General Staff in 1914 (b. 1850)

== October 26, 1914 (Monday) ==
- Battle of La Bassée — The Germans launched probing attacks on the British and French defensive line around Neuve-Chapelle but could not break through the line.
- First Battle of Edea — British and French colonial troops captured Edéa in German Cameroon.
- Russian forces defeated the Polish Legion at the villages of Laski and Anielin, the first major engagement the Legion fought for Austria-Hungary during World War I.
- The Ottoman naval fleet under command of Vice-Admiral Wilhelm Souchon left port on a "reconnaissance exercise" in the Black Sea.
- The Norwegian schooner Endurance, carrying members of the Imperial Trans-Antarctic Expedition led by British explorer Ernest Shackleton, arrived at the British-governed South Georgia Islands in the south Atlantic Ocean. They would stay at the Grytviken whaling station for a month before commencing to the Ross Ice Shelf of the Antarctic.
- Captain Robert Bartlett and eight survivors of Karluk arrived in Victoria, British Columbia on USS Bear, the American cutter Bartlett originally recruited to rescue the shipwreck survivors in the Bering Sea.
- Born: Jackie Coogan, American actor, best known for the title role in Charlie Chaplin's The Kid and Uncle Fester in the 1960s TV sitcom The Addams Family; as John Leslie Coogan, in Los Angeles, United States (d. 1984)

== October 27, 1914 (Tuesday) ==
- Battle of the Vistula River — The German Ninth Army and the Austria-Hungary First Army made a general retreat after failing to hold the western bank of the Vistula River. Austria-Hungary lost somewhere between 40,000 and 50,000 men while Germany lost just over 19,000.
- The Greek army occupied Northern Epirus with the approval of the Allies. In response to the Greek occupation, Italy sent its marines to occupy the Albanian port of Vlorë.
- The British super-dreadnought battleship HMS Audacious sank off Tory Island, northwest of Ireland, by a minefield laid by the German armed merchant cruiser Berlin.
- An explosion and fire in a coal mine near Royalton, Illinois killed 61 miners.
- The Chichibu railroad was established in Minano, Saitama, Japan, with stations Minano, Chichibu, Kuroya, Ōnohara, and Oyahana serving it.
- Born:
  - Ahmet Kireççi, Turkish wrestler, gold medalist at the 1948 Summer Olympics and bronze medalist at the 1936 Summer Olympics; in Mersin, Ottoman Empire (present-day Turkey) (killed in car accident, 1978)
  - Dylan Thomas, Welsh poet and author, most known for the poem "Do not go gentle into that good night"; in Uplands, Swansea, Wales (d. 1953)
- Died: Paul Anthelme Bourde, 63, French poet, member of the Decadent movement (b. 1851)

== October 28, 1914 (Wednesday) ==
- First Battle of Ypres — Responding to costly failures of the Fourth and Sixth German Armies to punch through the Allied line in western Belgium, German commanders ordered holding attacks while a new force was assembled to press an attack towards Ypres and Poperinge.
- Battle of La Bassée — Allied forces attempted to recapture Neuve-Chapelle, but disorganization inhibited any real advance. Forces included British, French, and Indian troops (many of them Sikhs) leading to language difficulties in communicating orders, along with most soldiers exhausted by nearly 15 days of fighting. Some soldiers were reported falling asleep while firing. British Indian forces in particular sustained major casualties, with the 47th Sikh company losing 221 out of 289 men. Eventually, Allied troops retired to their line to recover.
- Battle of Armentières — Despite being bombarded for two days by German artillery, defending French soldiers repulsed two waves of attacks and inflicted heavy enemy casualties.
- Battle of Penang — After successfully disguising itself as the British cruiser HMS Yarmouth, the German cruiser SMS Emden entered Penang harbour in British Malaya and torpedoed the Russian protected cruiser Zhemchug, killing 88 sailors and wounding 121, out of a crew of 250. The French destroyer Mousquet set off in pursuit of Emden, but was quickly sunk by the German ship.
- The Ottoman naval fleet in the Black Sea split up into four combat wings and began targeting Russian ports.
- Sentencing began of participants in the assassination of Archduke Franz Ferdinand in Sarajevo. The principle assassin, Gavrilo Princip, was relieved of a death sentence for being under the age 20 at the date of the assassination and was instead given 20 years imprisonment.
- Maritz rebellion — The rebel Boer commando unit under General Christian Frederick Beyers was attacked and dispersed by the South African regular army, forcing Beyers to go on the run for a month before his death at Vaal River on December 8.
- The Royal Victorian Aero Club was established at Moorabbin Airport in Melbourne.
- Born:
  - Jonas Salk, American medical researcher and virologist, developed the first successful polio vaccine; in New York City, United States (d. 1995)
  - Richard Laurence Millington Synge, English chemist, recipient of the Nobel Prize in Chemistry for the development of chromatography; in Liverpool, England (d. 1994)

== October 29, 1914 (Thursday) ==
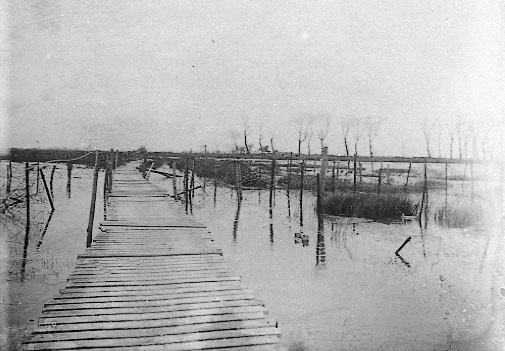
Flooded lowland near Yser; canals were flooded to slow the German advance in Belgium.

- German warships SMS Goeben and SMS Breslau, now with the Ottoman Navy, bombarded Russian ports Novorossiysk, Odessa and Sevastopol in the Black Sea.
- First Battle of Ypres — German forces captured a crucial crossroads point at Gheluvelt, Belgium, and took 600 British prisoners. Further pushes by the Germans put their artillery within range of Ypres by 3 kilometres (1.9 mi).
- Battle of the Yser — In a desperate attempt to prevent the Imperial German Army from overrunning the last major territory in Belgium, engineers opened the sluices that controlled the tides of the North Sea and flooded about 1-mile (1.6 km) of lowland from the seacoast to the town of Diksmuide in the south.
- Battle of Mołotków — Some 6,000 Polish Legion soldiers allied with the Central Powers clashed with 15,000 Russian troops near the village of Mołotków in Galicia (now part of Ukraine). The battle ended in a Russian victory, with Polish losses at 200 dead, 300 wounded and 400 captured. Russian forces lost 100 men.
- Siege of Mora – British and French colonial forces under command of Captain R. W. Fox began to assault the German stronghold located on the mountain of Mora, German Cameroon. Commanded by Captain Ernst von Raben, the German garrison of 200 would hold out for more than a year before surrendering.
- The Australian government passed the War Precautions Act, which gave the government special powers for the duration of World War I and for six months afterwards.
- The cornerstones for the Brooks County Courthouse in Falfurrias, Texas were laid. The courthouse was named after former Texas Ranger and judge James Brooks, who spearheaded the project. The court house was added to the National Register of Historic Places in 2012.
- Born: Manuel Flores Leon Guerrero, Guam state leader, 6th Governor of Guam from 1963 to 1969; in Agana, Guam, United States (present-day Hagåtña) (d. 1985)
- Died: Félix Bracquemond, 81, French painter, awarded grande medaille d'honneur at the 1900 Universal Exhibition (b. 1833)

== October 30, 1914 (Friday) ==
- First Battle of Ypres — German forces attacked the left flank of the British Expeditionary Force at Gheluvelt, Belgium, but were repulsed, while a motley command of French and British troops rallied to retake key villages British lost to the offense.
- Battle of the Yser — The Germans launched a large attack that punched through the Belgian Army's defensive and were able to reach Nieuwpoort and Pervijze in Belgium.
- Battle of La Bassée — German attacked during the nighttime and engaged British Indian troops sent to relieve Allied forces. Despite assurances of ten days of rest, many of the Allied troops were relocated to other positions in the front of northeastern France with an engineer corps remaining behind to build more fortifications.
- Battle of Messines — German forces launched a general assault on the Allied line, forcing them to withdraw from the town of Hollebeke on their north flank while retaining Messines on their south.
- Battle of Rufiji Delta — The German cruiser SMS Königsberg was blocked from leaving the mouth of Rufiji River in German East Africa (now Tanzania) by British warships HMS Chatham, HMS Dartmouth and Weymouth.
- SS Rohilla, requisitioned as a military hospital ship, was lost by grounding in a storm on rocks off Whitby, England, with the loss of 85 lives.
- Two days after the Battle of Penang, the German cruiser SMS Emden stopped a British steamer and transferred survivors it picked up after sinking the French destroyer Mousquet.
- The new Union Station, designed by architect Jarvis Hunt, opened in Kansas City, Missouri as the second-largest train station in the United States.
- Born: Leabua Jonathan, Mosotho state leader, second Prime Minister of Lesotho; in Leribe, Basutoland (present-day Leribe, Lesotho) (d. 1987)

== October 31, 1914 (Saturday) ==
- The Battle of the Vistula River concluded in a Russian victory over German and Austro-Hungarian forces around Warsaw. However, the Imperial German Army destroyed much of the rails and bridges to delay the Imperial Russian Army from advancing. Still, the victory boosted the morale of the Russian Army at a crucial time as it proved the armies of the Central Powers could be beaten.
- Battle of the Yser — Belgian and French counter-attacks stalled the German advance, allowing them to recover Nieuwpoort, Belgium. The Germans canceled a final attack after learning the Allies had flooded the tributaries of the Yser River in their rear and withdrew later that night. The price has been high for Belgium, with casualties estimated to be between 20,000 and 40,000 (French forces sustained 15,000). However, Germany's casualties were greater during the retreat, with estimates exceeding 76,000.
- First Battle of Ypres — The Germans broke through Allied line near Gheluvelt, Belgium, but a critical counter-attack by a British regiment restored the line.
- Battle of Messines — The German army captured parts of the town of Messines.
- Battle of Armentières — France consolidated its defense forces north of the Lys while the British Expeditionary Force was able to repulse German attacks on its trenches over a 48-hour period.
- Siege of Tsingtao — The Imperial Japanese Navy began shelling the German colonial port Tsingtao in China.
- Italian forces seized Sazan Island off the coast of Albania to further contain Greek military occupation in the country.
- The British naval cruiser HMS Hermes was sunk by the German submarine SM U-27 in the Strait of Dover with the loss of 44 lives.
- German troops from German South West Africa raided and destroyed a Portuguese fort at Cuangar, Angola in retaliation for the deaths of German officers in Naulila earlier in October, killing 8 soldiers and one civilian in what was referred to as the "Cuangar Massacre".
- Government troops defeated a rebel army of 300 that attempted to take the port city of Esmeraldas, Ecuador, killing or wounding 100 men.
- The 29th Indian Brigade of the British Indian Army was established.
- The Royal Navy battleship Barham was launched by John Brown & Company in Clydebank, Scotland.
- The Nair Service Society was established in southern India as a caste-based organization that owned and managed a number of educational institutions and hospitals.
- Born: Robert E. Smylie, American politician, 24th Governor of Idaho; in Marcus, Iowa, United States (d. 2004)
