= Battle of Kusseri =

WW1 Battle in Kamerun (August to September 1914)

Coordinates: 12°05′N 15°02′E

- Part of the Kamerun campaign in World War I
| Date | Late August – 25 September 1914 |
| Location | Kusseri, German Kamerun |
| Result | French victory |

Belligerents
| France: (French Third Republic) French Equatorial Africa | German Empire: German Kamerun |

Commanders and leaders
| (French Third Republic) Col. Largeau | Lt. Siegfried Kallmeyer |

Strength
| 250; 1 gun | 37 |

Casualties and losses
| 23; 1 gun | 12 |

The Battle of Kusseri between German and French forces took place from late August to 25 September 1914 in Kusseri, northeastern Kamerun during the Kamerun campaign of World War I. The action resulted in the French capture of the Kusseri fort and the German garrison's retreat to Mora.

== Background ==
Upon the outbreak of World War I, French forces under the command of Colonel Largeau, across the border from German Kamerun in French Equatorial Africa stationed at Fort Lamy, invaded the colony. Their goal was to capture the German fort at Kusseri, near Lake Chad which would allow French forces to assist British ones in their attacks on German forces in western Kamerun. The German garrison, under Lieutenant Kallmeyer consisted of 31 men. Five more were recruited from the town of Kusseri when it became known that the French were invading. Kallmeyer surrounded the fort with thick thorny bushes in preparation for the oncoming attack.

== Battle ==
The French had sent 250 riflemen and one artillery piece to capture the German fort in late August. The initial French assaults on the fort were repelled by German machine guns and resulted in heavy casualties. Additionally, the lone French artillery piece was destroyed by the Germans. After these failures, the French withdrew to Fort Lamy, but returned with reinforcements on 20 September 1914. Considering the size of his force in comparison to the French one, and the fatigue that had come about after continual attacks, Kallmeyer decided that staying to fight was futile and that retreat was the only option.

== Aftermath ==
Shortly after midnight on 25 September, following a strong French attack on the fort, German soldiers made a fighting retreat from Kusseri. In the chaos and thick bush, the force got separated. They made their way to the German stronghold at Mora, approximately 150 kilometers to the southwest and arrived there from 28 September to 9 October. 25 soldiers remained of the 37 that had originally made up the German garrison at Kusseri. The rest had been killed in battle, captured during the retreat, or deserted. The remaining members of the detachment would later participate in the Siege of Mora. The French renamed the fort at Kusseri, Fort Foureau following its capture on 25 September.
