= Frederick Hugh Cunliffe =

British general

Brigadier-General Frederick Hugh Cunliffe CB CMG
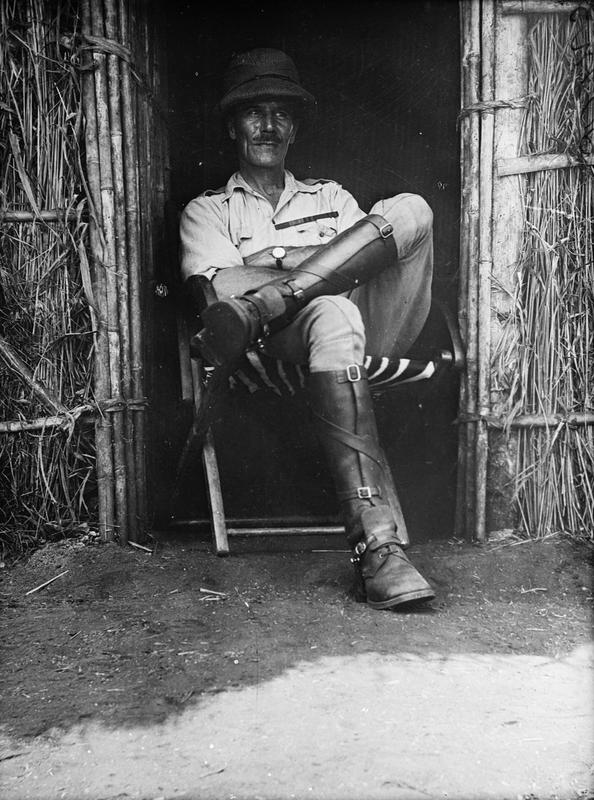
- Cunliffe during the First World War
- Born: 6 September 1861
- Died: 13 June 1955 (aged 93); London, England
- Spouse: Ella Sophie Gaussen (m. 1895–1950)
- Military career
- Allegiance: United Kingdom
- Branch: British Army
- Service years: 1879–1919
- Rank: Brigadier-General
- Commands: Nigeria Regiment
- Conflicts: Hazara Expedition of 1891; Chitral Expedition; Second Boer War; First World War: African theatre of World War I; Kamerun campaign; Second Battle of Garua; Battle of Ngaundere; Siege of Mora
- Awards: Companion of the Order of the Bath; Companion of the Order of St Michael and St George; Mentioned in Despatches; Commander of the Legion of Honour (France); Officer of the Order of St. Maurice and St. Lazarus (Italy)

Brigadier-General Frederick Hugh Gordon Cunliffe, CB, CMG (6 September 1861 – 13 June 1955) was a British Army officer who was one of the main British commanders at the Kamerun campaign during the First World War, and earned a key victory at the Siege of Mora.

== Early life and family ==
Frederick Hugh Gordon Cunliffe was born on 6 September 1861, the son of Major General George Gordon Cunliffe and Pauline Lumsdaine. He married Ella Sophie Gaussen in 1895 and the couple had one daughter, Cecile Gertrude Cunliffe.

== Military career ==
Cunliffe began his military career at the United Services College, Westward Ho!, where he joined the 1st Warwickshire Militia. He was subsequently commissioned in the 9th Queen's Royal Lancers in 1887. He served in the Hazara Expedition of 1891 and was awarded the India General Service Medal with clasp 'Hazara 1891'. He later also participated in the Chitral Expedition and the Second Boer War.

On 3 April 1906 he was transferred from the Royal Inniskilling Fusiliers as a major into the Middlesex Regiment. He was promoted on 22 September 1911 to lieutenant colonel.

=== First World War ===
When the First World War broke out, Cunliffe was commandant of the Nigeria Regiment. He took part in the Kamerun campaign and, around 1915, in order to take the German fortresses at Garua, he commenced the Second Battle of Garua. The battle ended in a British victory, and Cunliffe pushed further to give pressure to Central Kamerun, engaging the Germans at the Battle of Ngaundere.

Cunliffe, promoted to brevet colonel on 24 July 1915, was the British commander during the later half of the Siege of Mora, arriving on 23 August to reinforce the siege. Due to his efforts, he convinced Captain Ernst von Raben to surrender with the terms of offering Raben a safe passage back home along with providing him £2000 to pay his Askaris. Following the victory at Mora, Cunliffe, promoted to substantive colonel on 22 September, was appointed a Companion of the Order of St Michael and St George in 1916. He was then assigned as Brigadier of the HQ unit from 1917 to 1919.

After the end of the war, he was appointed a Commander of the French Legion of Honour and an Officer of the Italian Order of St. Maurice and St. Lazarus.

== Later years ==
Cunliffe died on 13 June 1955 in London, aged 93.
