= Siege of Mora =

WW1 Battle in Kamerun (August 1914 to February 1916)

Coordinates: 11°03′N 14°09′E

- Part of the Kamerun campaign in World War I
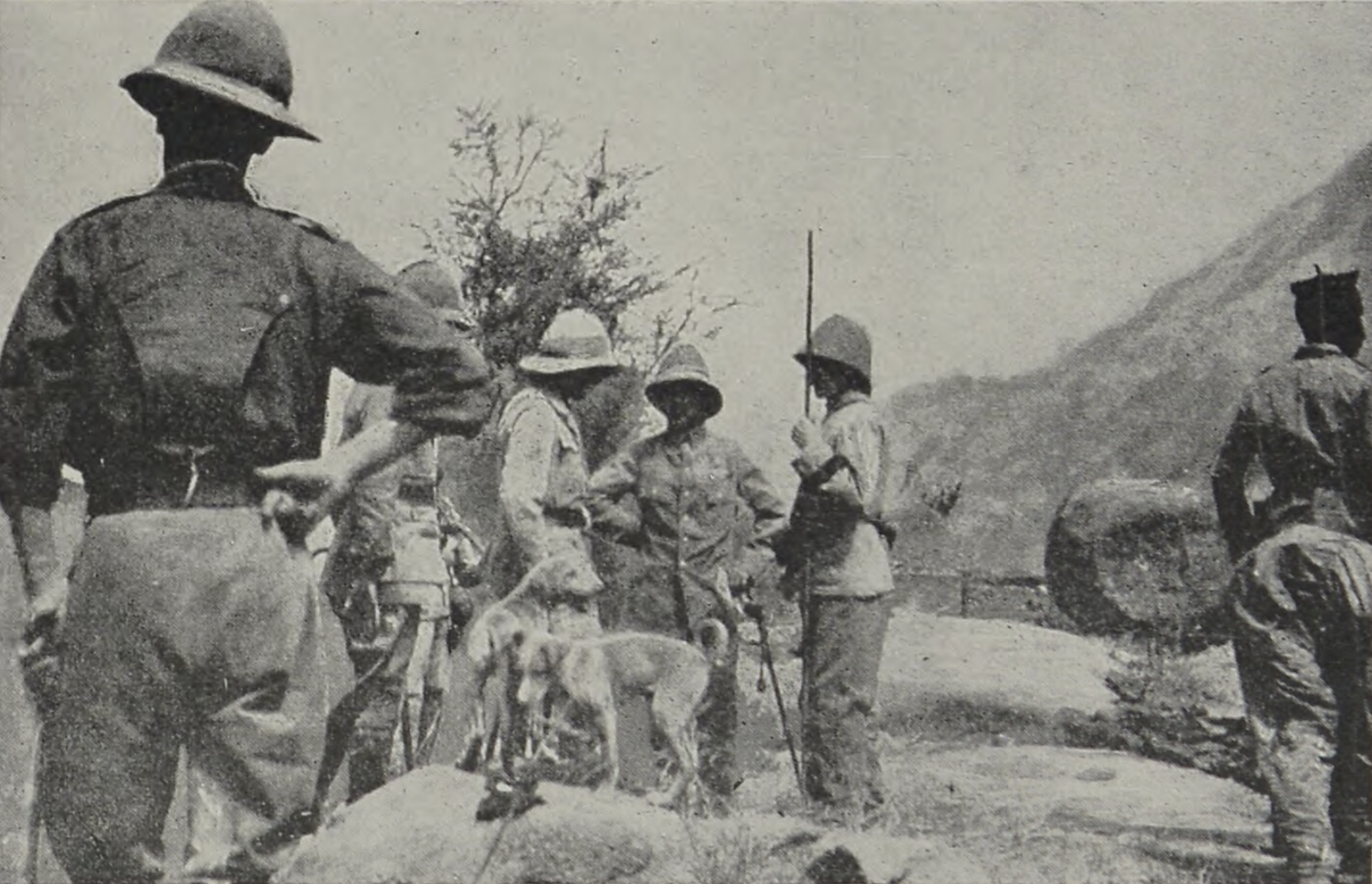
- Captain Ernst von Raben (third from the left) at the moment of surrendering to the British officer in charge of the operations against Mora Hill
Date	26 August 1914 – 18 February 1916 (1 year, 5 months, 3 weeks and 2 days)
Location	Mora, northern Kamerun
Result	Allied victory

Belligerents
British Empire (French Third Republic) France	German Empire

Commanders and leaders
(British Empire) Frederick Hugh Cunliffe (British Empire) R. W. Fox (French Third Republic) Brisett (French Third Republic) Ferrandi	Ernst von Raben (surrendered); Siegfried Kallmeyer

Strength
(British Empire) 150 (French Third Republic) 300	(German Empire) 204

Casualties and losses
Unknown	27 killed 45 wounded 10 captured

The siege of Mora or siege of Moraberg, between Allied and besieged German troops, took place from August 1914 to February 1916 on and around the Mora mountain in northern Kamerun during the Kamerun campaign of the First World War. After more than a year of siege German forces on the mountain surrendered, following the escape of many German troops to the neutral Spanish colony of Río Muni. It was the second longest siege of the war, behind the Siege of Medina.

== Background ==
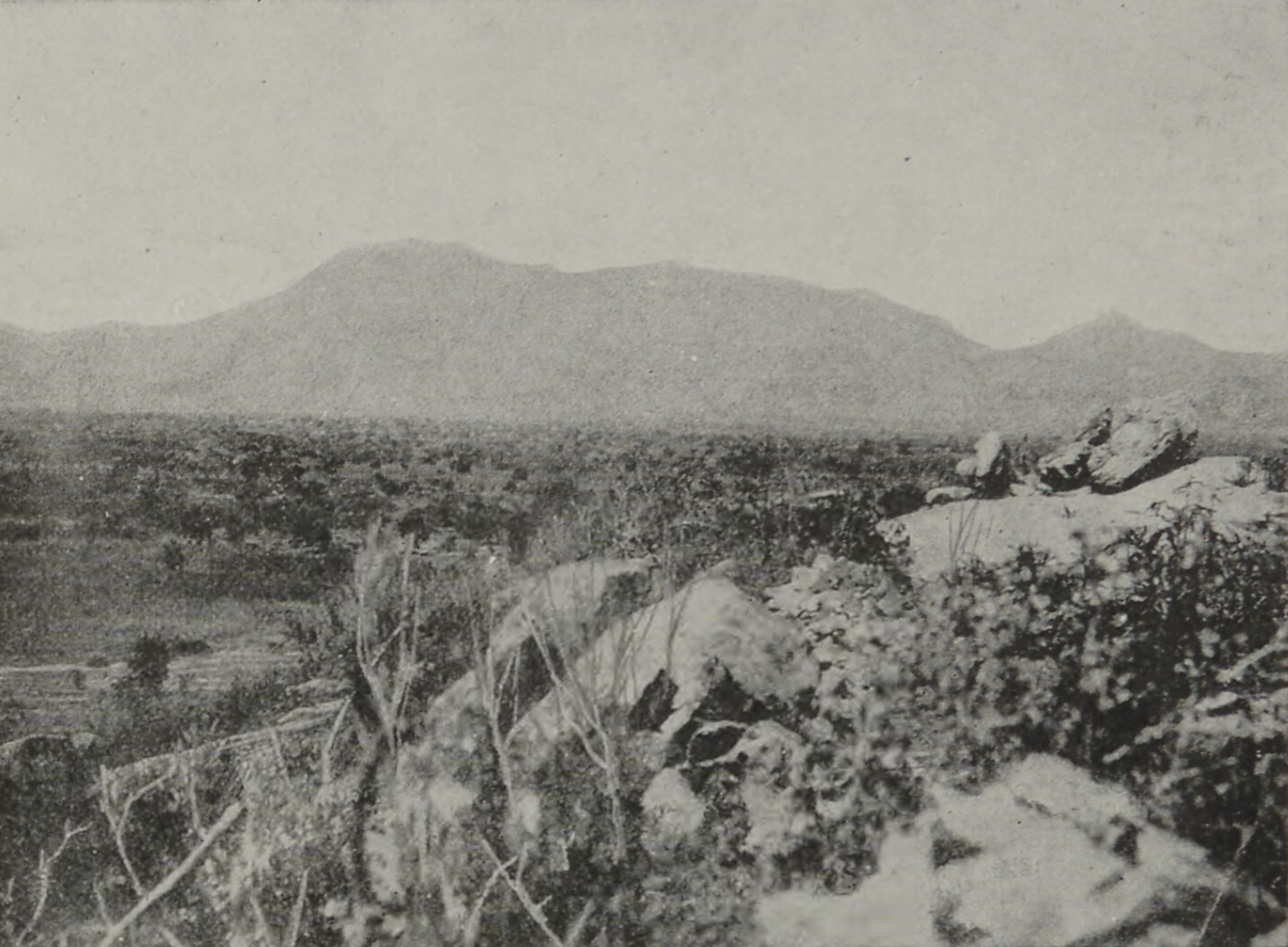
View of the Mora Hill, 1916

In early August 1914 the First World War broke out in Europe, and the Allies began the task of conquering Germany's African colonies. The German West African colony of Togoland was defeated on 26 August, freeing up British and French troops for the invasion of Kamerun. In preparation, British columns had stationed themselves at various intervals along Nigeria's border with the German colony, the northernmost of which, commanded by Captain R. W. Fox, was stationed at Maiduguri, across the border from the German fort at Mora. This Nigerian detachment, consisting of one infantry and one mounted company, had entrenched itself on the frontier while awaiting orders and gathering intelligence on German forces in the region.

The fort at Mora, about 100 miles south of Lake Chad, near the colony's western border with Nigeria, was guarded by a company of Schutztruppen (protection troops) under the command of Captain Ernst von Raben. Initially the garrison consisted of 14 European and 125 African soldiers, most of whom were tough, well-trained Askaris. Von Raben managed to recruit 65 more men before the Allied siege began. On 13 August, the German commander relocated the garrison from the fort on the plain to positions partway up Mora mountain. This gave them a commanding view over the surrounding area and easy access to water. Mora mountain, which would become a fortress during the siege, was approximately 30 miles around at its base and 1,700 feet high. German forces prepared for British attack by heavily fortifying their positions on its steep slopes.

=== British occupation of Sava ===
On the morning of 19 August, German sentries detected around 50 mounted British soldiers near Mora. Captain von Raben and 30 of his soldiers descended from the mountain and, after a firefight, forced the British to retreat. The German commander then ordered the destruction of the fort at Sava, to prevent its use by the Allies. British scouts continued to harass German forces in the region. On 20 August, upon receiving orders to attack Mora from Colonel C. H. P. Carter, Captain Fox sent his forces marching towards the town. They arrived on 26 August and occupied positions at Sava, about three kilometers from the German defenses on the mountain. They were joined by 16 French soldiers from French Equatorial Africa. The Allied position was on the road between Mora and Garua, thus preventing any contact between the two German garrisons.

== Siege ==
=== First allied attack ===
On the night of 27 August, Captain Fox led a detachment of French and British troops to the very top of Mora mountain, in hopes of attacking the German trenches from above. When morning came the Allied forces began to fire down into the German trenches, but found they were beyond effective range. The Allied detachment was then counter-attacked by the Germans, who forced them to retreat back down the mountain. As they made their way down a thick mist fell, causing a group to become disoriented and wander away from the main detachment. When the fog rose, Captain Fox's soldiers saw counter-attacking German troops in the distance wearing red fezzes, and, mistaking them for the similarly uniformed French troops who had gone astray, did not initially engage them. The German force overwhelmed the British, killing three, including a doctor, capturing one, and forcing the rest to retreat back to Sava. The Germans lost one African soldier in this encounter.

=== Both sides reinforce their positions ===
After returning from their first attack on the German positions, the British began building defenses on a hill near Sava, closer to Mora mountain, and Captain Fox requested that artillery be brought up from Nigeria. At this time, the small French force under Captain Ferrandi returned to Fort Lamy in French Equatorial Africa. The Allied attack having made them aware of the vulnerabilities of their position on the slopes of the mountain, the Germans relocated to the summit in early September. A German force at Fort Kusseri, under Lieutenant Kallmeyer, withdrew to Mora in late September, further strengthening von Raben's defences. Around 300 French troops under Lieutenant Colonel Brisett were also freed up after the Battle of Kusseri, and joined the British force at Mora, occupying several hills around the mountain. By late October 1914 the Allies had machine guns and artillery in position. The Germans prepared for the imminent siege by sending scavenging parties to gather as much food as possible, in which they were quite successful.

=== 1914 ===
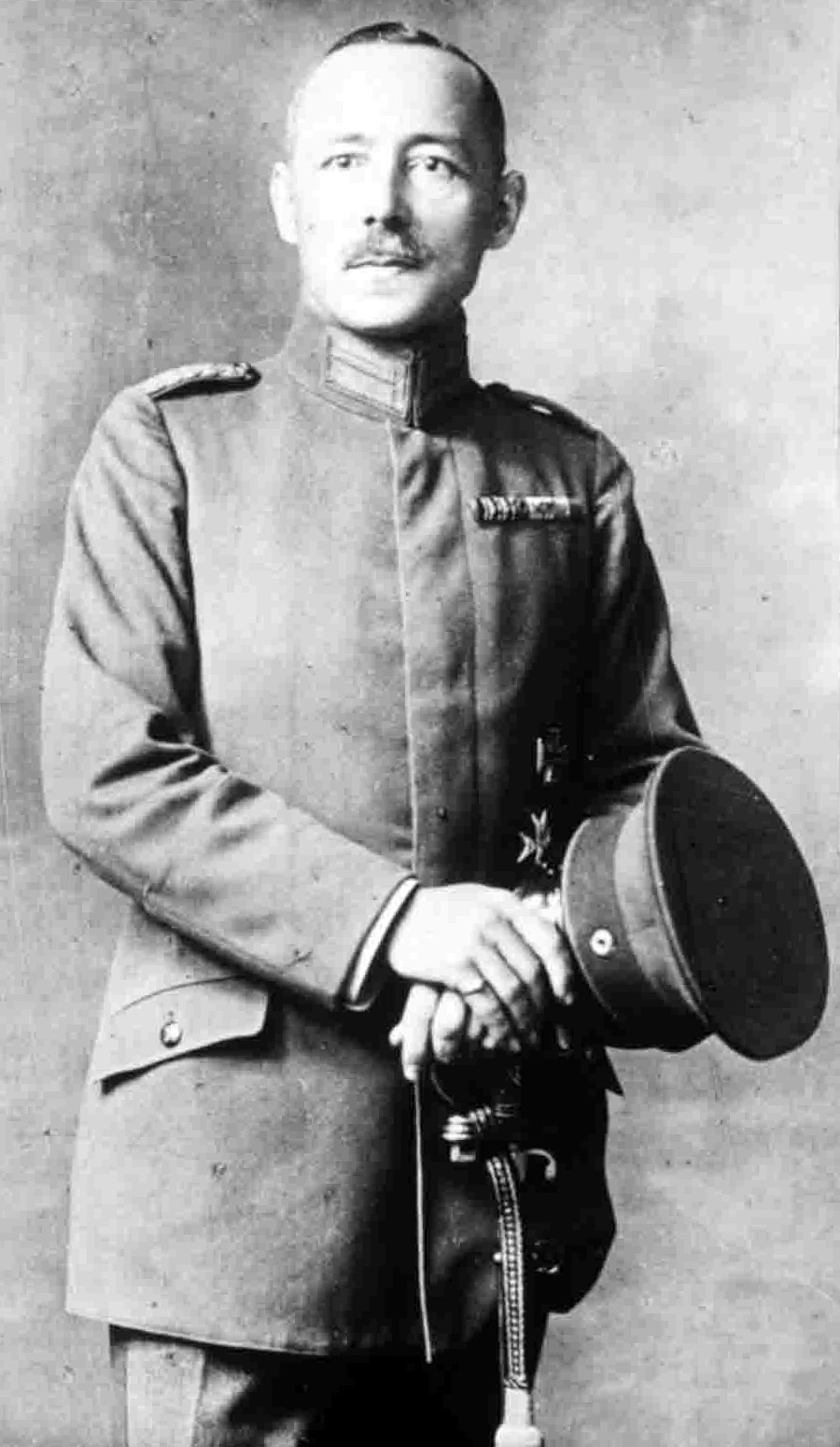
German commander at Mora, Major Ernst von Raben

On 29 October, Allied artillery began to pound the German positions while machine guns fired at the Schutztruppen. Two days later a French Senegalese unit attempted to storm the German positions atop the mountain, and was almost completely destroyed. Further waves of French troops continued to charge up the slopes, and were also cut down. One result of this action was that German troops were able to seize supplies from the Allied dead, including ammunition and even machine guns. A short truce ensued for the purpose of burying those who had died in the attacks.

On 4 November, artillery bombarded German forward positions on the north side of Mora. A French infantry attack followed, which resulted in the death of two German officers and three soldiers, and the Allied occupation of the outpost. The remainder of the German force withdrew, but fighting continued throughout the night, until German forces under the command of an African sergeant stormed and retook the position.

As time went on German forces began to run out of supplies, the shortage of food being particularly serious. With the Allied encirclement complete, scavenging parties could no longer venture into the countryside. The horses, donkeys, and camels that had been brought up to the mountain for transportation were slaughtered and eaten. Water sources were unprotected and exposed to machine gun and artillery attacks. Nevertheless, further Allied attempts to dislodge the Germans from their trenches failed.

=== Christmas truce ===
On 24 December 1914, after almost four months of siege, the German defenders saw a white flag hoisted over the Allied positions. Cut off from any sources of information, many in the garrison thought it might mean the war in Europe had ended; in fact, the British merely wished to send Sergeant Taylor, who was in German captivity, a few gifts. The German commander, Captain von Raben, also received a parcel of gifts from Captain Fox, containing blankets, cigarettes and even a Christmas tree. The British offered a cease-fire for 24 and 25 December, to which the Germans agreed. British and German officers met several times on these days to exchange gifts. On 1 January 1915, the British raised the white flag once again, and a meeting between von Raben and Fox, who had been acquaintances before the war, was arranged. This time, however, French forces did not comply with the cease-fire, and continued to shell the German positions.

=== 1915 ===
In early 1915 the Germans faced extreme thirst, as the dry season was underway and their water sources had been contaminated by cadavers. On 22 January the final cow was slaughtered and rations were cut further. Allied guns continued to target water sources, making it more difficult for the Germans to retrieve what water there was. At the end of April the dry season ended, dashing any Allied hope of thirst forcing a German surrender; the food situation, however, remained desperate. The Germans began sending patrols down the mountain at night to attempt to penetrate the Allied lines and scavenge for food. This was very dangerous work, but yielded some results for the starving force on the mountain.

By mid June the German fortress at Garua had been taken in the Second Battle of Garua, and other German forces were retreating to the center of the colony. The Allies tightened their lines closer around the mountain, but their attacks slowed in the Spring. Realizing the situation in the rest of Kamerun was dire, von Raben offered his African soldiers freedom to leave, but none accepted. Later, Sergeant Batinga led 13 men on a daring night-time raid in which they burned down the British camp at Sava. Further raids in May and June obtained food, guns, ammunition and other supplies while killing ten Allied troops and wounding four.

On 6 August, French forces attempted to take the village of Kilwe, belonging to a tribe that supported the Germans. German forces under Sergeants Weissenberger and Steffens counter-attacked, killing one French soldier and pushing the rest back to their lines. They left a force of a dozen soldiers in the village to prevent another Allied attack. On 1 September, the Allies brought up larger artillery pieces and resumed their bombardment of the positions on the slopes of the mountain. The next day 42 French soldiers again attacked Kilwe and were repulsed, leaving seven dead.

General Frederick Hugh Cunliffe, commander of Allied forces in northern Kamerun, began to push for stronger efforts to defeat the Germans on the Moraberg. On 7 September Allied guns opened a heavy bombardment concentrating on Mora's northernmost outposts, which were commanded by Lieutenant Kallmeyer. The barrage continued throughout the night, followed by a British infantry assault in the morning. The attack fell apart under heavy fire from Kallmeyer's men, with a British captain and 15 African soldiers killed, and five Germans wounded. Two more attempts to storm this German post were undertaken at night, but collapsed in confusion as troops became lost in the darkness. After this series of assaults failed, Cunliffe elected to reduce the size and frequency of infantry attacks and instead concentrate on hammering enemy positions on Mora with increasing amounts of artillery.

Captain von Raben was wounded by a bullet to the head on 30 September, while visiting German forward positions. Due to the lack of adequate medicine at Mora, he was confined to a sickbed while his second in command, Lieutenant Siegfried Kallmeyer, took temporary control of the company. Food stocks continued to dwindle, and on 8 December British troops burned the village of Wudume, which had been supplying food to the Germans.

=== German surrender ===
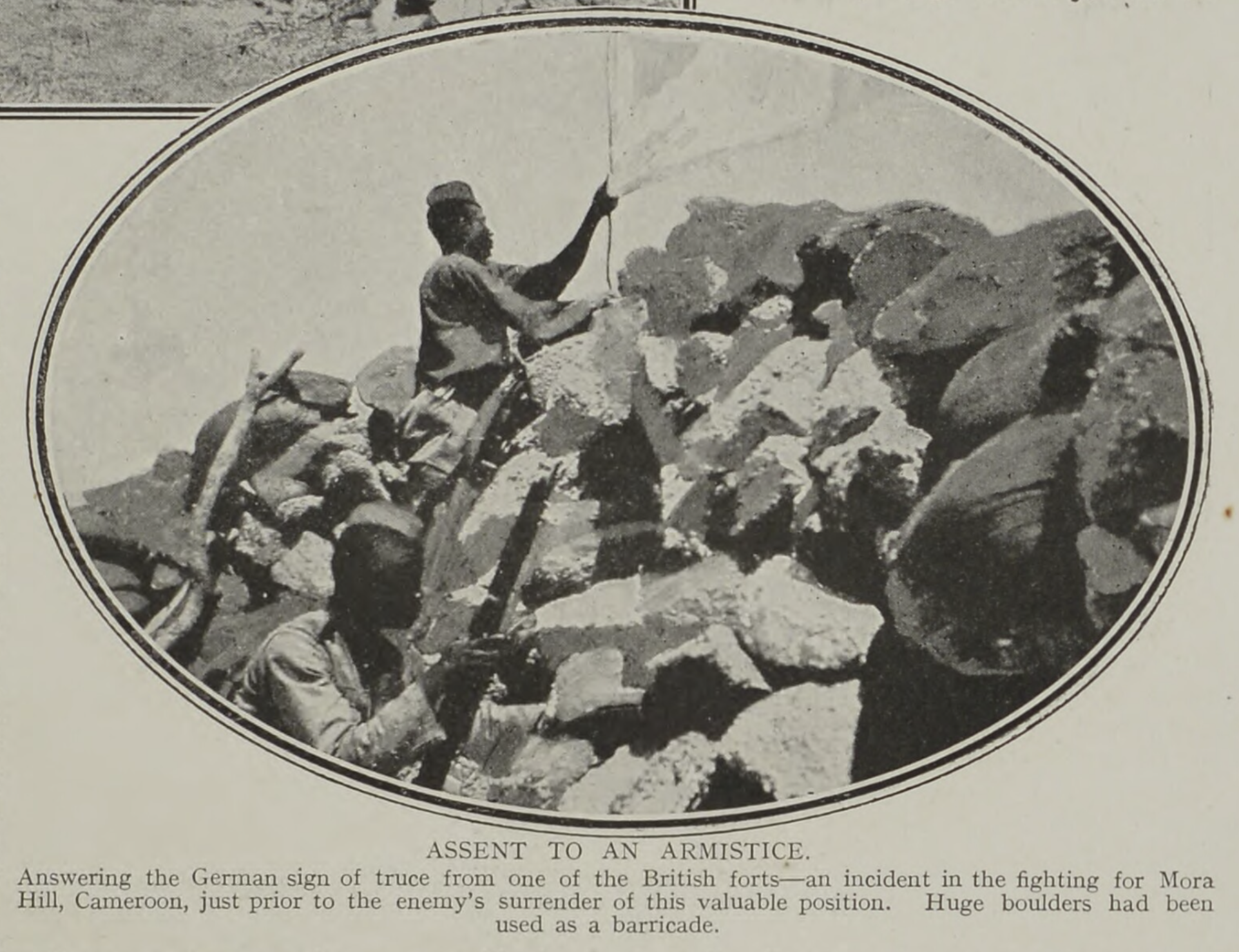
Assent of an armistice at the siege of Mora, 18 February 1916

In early 1916, the German forces had been under siege for almost a year and a half. Their food stocks had been exhausted, although their munitions were still plentiful (they still had 37,000 rounds of ammunition). On 15 February 1916, Captain Ernst von Raben received a letter from General Cunliffe offering to return the Askaris safely to their homes, and the Europeans to internment in England. At this point, Kamerun had been effectively surrendered to the Allies, as the colonial government and most of the remaining army had fled to the neutral Spanish colony of Río Muni. Realizing their situation was dire, and that any continued resistance would be fruitless, the German commander agreed to capitulate, asking that the British, in addition to safe passage, provide him with £2000 with which to pay his Askaris - which they did. Von Raben surrendered along with the remaining 155 men under his command on 18 February 1916.

== Aftermath ==
The surrender of the German force at Mora signaled the end of German resistance in Kamerun and the beginning of the British and French occupation of the country. The Treaty of Versailles in 1919 partitioned the colony between the two powers, creating the new colonies of British Cameroon and French Cameroon.
