= BTH Bank =

- Type: Privately held company
- Industry: Banking
- Founded: October 21, 1914; 112 years ago
- Defunct: October 8, 2022
- Fate: Merged into Origin Bank
- Headquarters: Quitman, Texas
- Key people: Bob Dyer, Chairman & CEO, Lori Sirman, President
- Total assets: $1.979 billion (6/30/20)
- Total equity: $0.260 billion (6/30/20)
- Website: www.bthbank.com

BTH Bank was a bank headquartered in Quitman, Texas. It operated 13 branches, all of which are in East Texas and the Dallas–Fort Worth metroplex.

== History ==
The bank was formed as The First National Bank of Quitman on October 21, 1914.

In 2005, the bank changed its name to BankTexas.

In 2013, Bob Dyer was named chairman and chief executive officer of the bank.

The bank received $42 million in equity investments in 2013 and another $45 million in equity investments in 2015.

In 2015, the bank changed its name to BTH Bank to differentiate itself and comply with intellectual property laws.

In 2017, the bank was ranked third in total deposits in Longview, Texas.

In October 2017, the bank opened a branch in McKinney, Texas.

On August 1, 2022, Origin Bancorp, the holding company for Origin Bank of Choudrant, Louisiana, completed its acquisition of BT Holdings, the bank's holding company. BTH Bank was merged into Origin Bank on October 8, 2022.
