= Appley Bridge meteorite =

Meteorite that hit ground in 1914

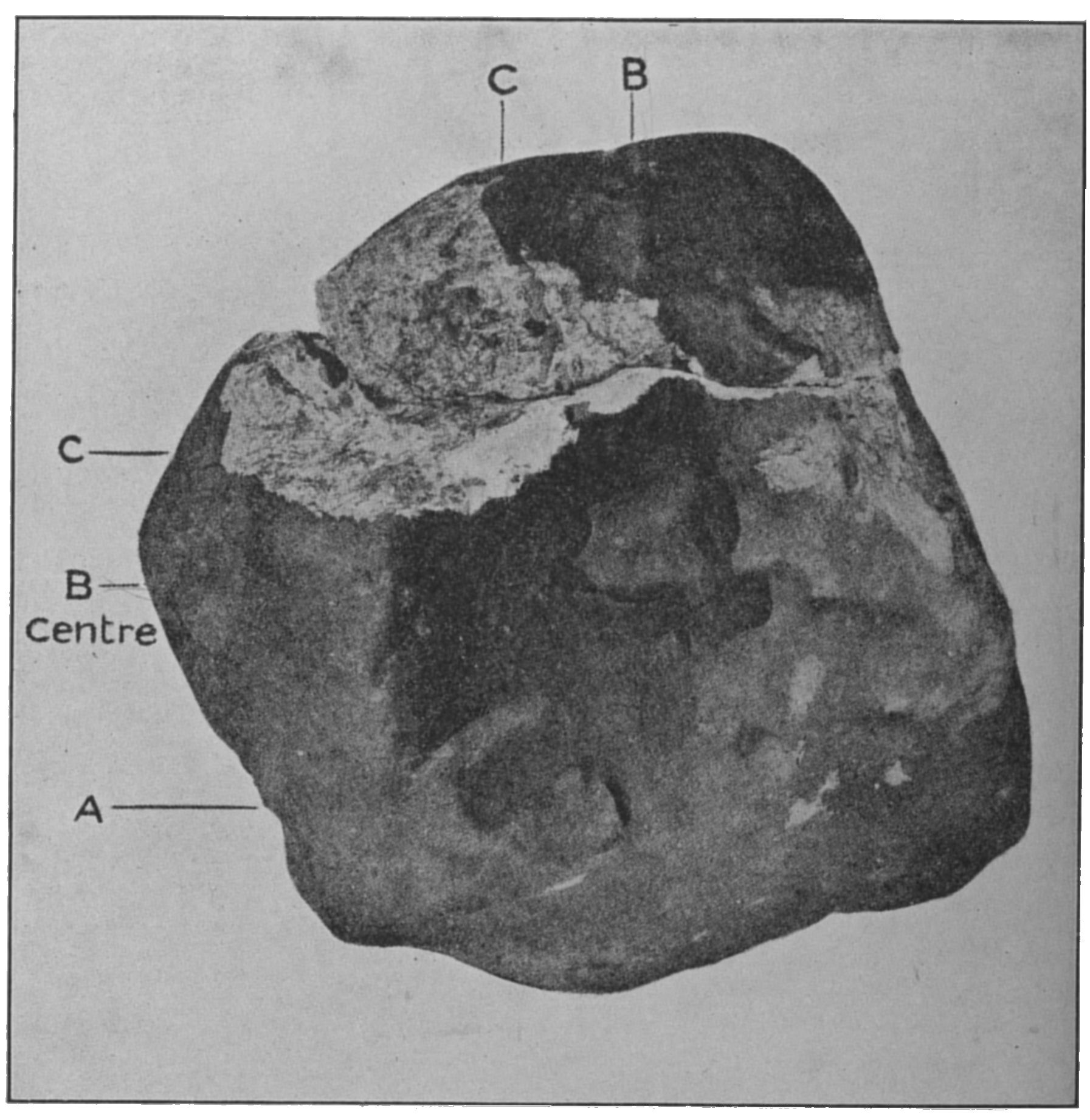
- Type: Ordinary chondrite
- Group: LL6
- Country: England
- Region: Appley Bridge, Lancashire
- Coordinates: 53°35′N 2°43′W
- Observed fall: Yes
- Fall date: 13 October 1914
- TKW: 33 pounds (15 kg)
- Related media on Wikimedia Commons

The Appley Bridge meteorite is a meteorite that hit ground at Halliwell Farm in Appley Bridge, Lancashire, England at around 8:45 p.m. on Tuesday, 13 October 1914.

After local residents saw a bolide, the meteorite was subsequently found in a farmer's field in the village the following day. It was 18 inches (460 mm) below the surface of the field, with the appearance of burnt iron, and weighed almost 33 pounds (15 kg).

An article in Scientific News (No. 2588, 30 October 1914) stated "a small fragment which had been detached from the larger mass was put on view in a shop-window at Appley Bridge."

A collection of letters, memoranda, and news-cuttings pertaining to the meteorite is held by the Natural History Museum Archives in London. In 2011, a fragment weighing less than an ounce and mounted in a one-inch plastic gem case was sold for £1,000 by auctioneers Lyon & Turnbull in Edinburgh.

== See also ==
- Glossary of meteoritics
- Meteorite fall
