= Ernst von Raben =

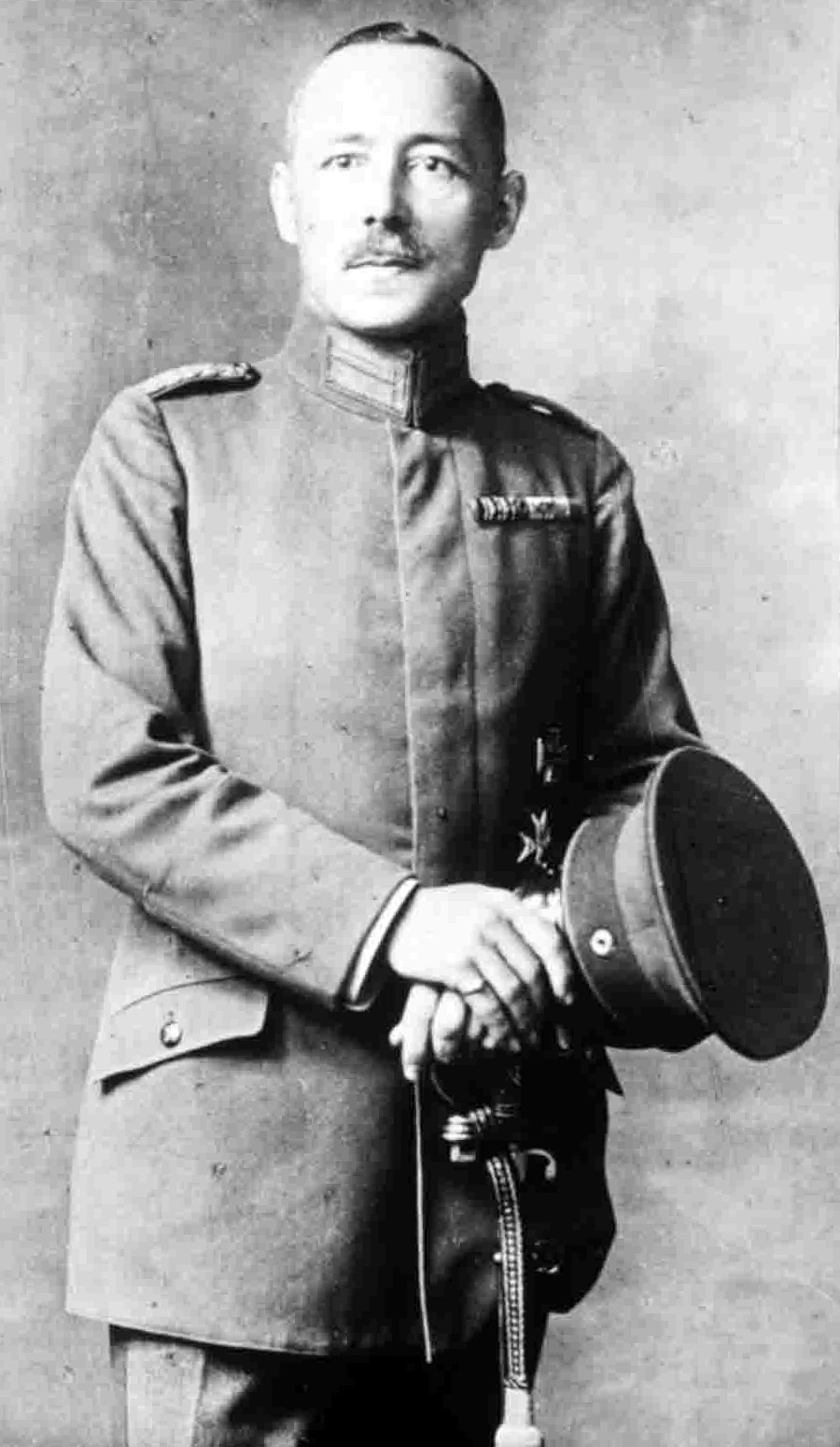
- Born: September 22, 1877; Schwäbisch Gmünd, Württemberg, Germany
- Died: June 7, 1924 (aged 46); Gütersloh, Rhine Province, Prussia, Germany
- Military career
- Allegiance: German Empire; Kamerun; Weimar Republic
- Branch: Imperial German Army; Schutztruppe; Reichsheer
- Service years: 1897 – 1919
- Rank: Major
- Conflicts: World War I: Kamerun campaign; Siege of Mora (surrendered)

Ernst Klaus Iwan Christian Friedrich Alfred von Raben was a German Major who had served as a commander of the Schutztruppe before surrendering at the Siege of Mora.

== Origin ==
Ernst von Raben was the son of Karl von Raben, a Landwehr major in the district of Esslingen am Neckar, and his wife Babette, née Fleck. Ernst received an education in his parental home before attending pre-school in Gmünd and Schlettstadt. Afterwards he entered the Schloss Oranienstein Cadet School and then attended the Preußische Hauptkadettenanstalt.

== Military career ==
On March 13, 1897, Raben joined the 120th (2nd Württemberg) Infantry "Emperor William, King of Prussia" as a lieutenant. On April 5, 1901, he resigned from the Army of Württemberg and joined the Cameroon Protection Force the following day. He was first stationed in the so-called grasslands and took part in the Ngolo Expedition from August to October 1901. In June 1905 he was involved in combat against the Falli in northern Cameroon.

In February 1906 he returned into Württemberg service, back to his old regiment. On February 25, 1907, he was promoted to first lieutenant, without a formal commission as such, and in March he went on leave to London for six months. On August 6, 1907, he resigned from the army again and rejoined the Cameroon protection force. In November 1907 he became post leader in Dikwa and in 1910 and 1911 he was deputy resident of the German Chadseeländer. On January 27, 1913, he was promoted to captain and on May 30, 1914, he took over the leadership of the 3rd Company in Mora in the far north of Cameroon.

During this time, Raben developed a personal interest in the local peoples as he learnt their languages and recorded some of their lives through a series of photographs.

=== World War I ===
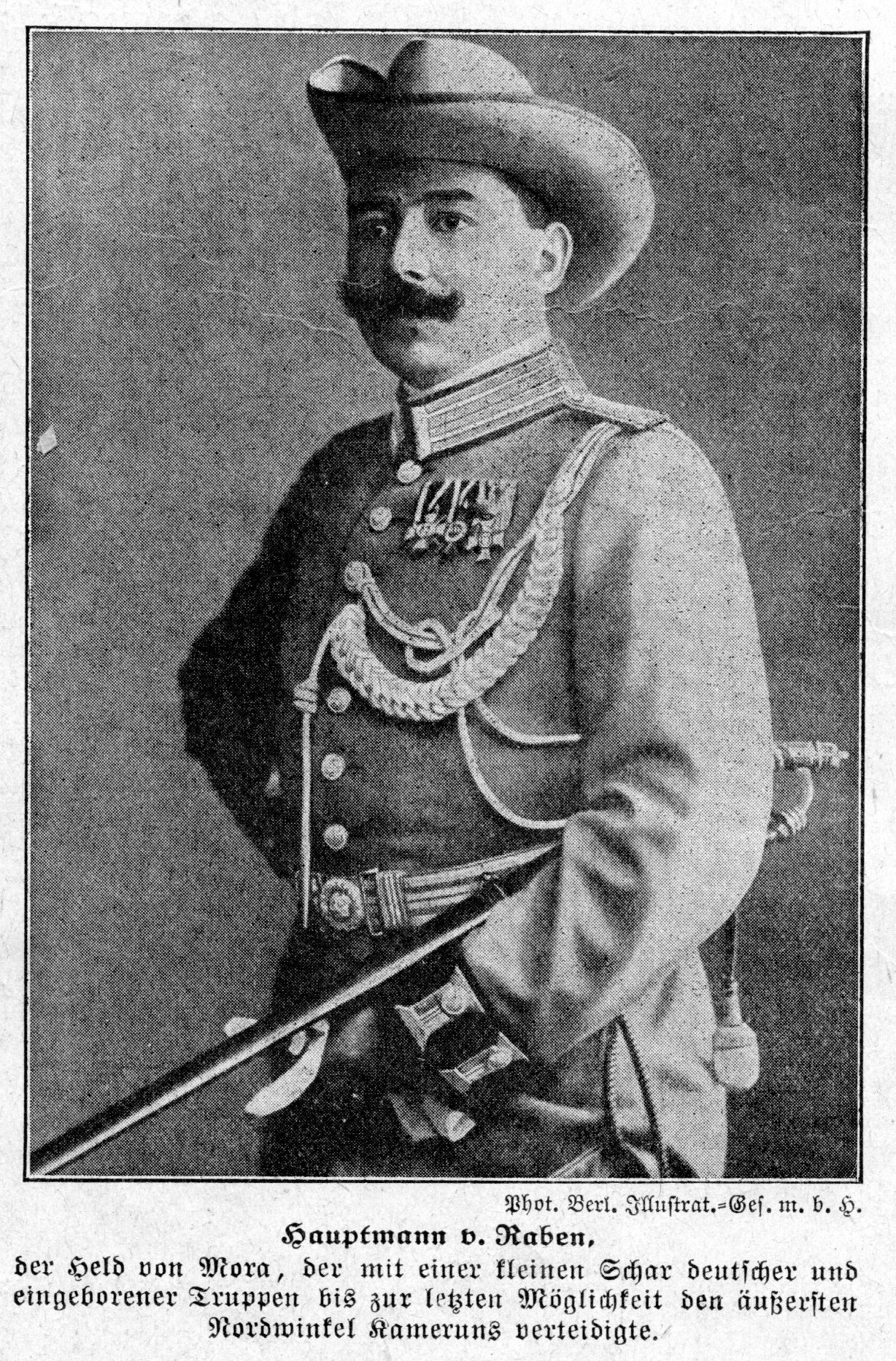
Captain Ernst von Raben in the Cameroon Protection Force

At the start of World War I, the 3rd Company at Mora was surrounded by French colonial troops, which later were reinforced by British contingents. The troops were cut off from all contact with the command of the Schutztruppe under Lieutenant Colonel Carl Heinrich Zimmermann and therefore had neither information about the course of the war nor any logistical or tactical support from headquarters. For a more expedient defense the company had taken position on the nearby Madara Mountains. This position was temporarily expanded into a fortress. Despite numerous attacks, including with artillery and sometimes outnumbering the defenders nine to one, the Entente forces were unable to take the position. The strategic importance of the conflict was the 3rd Company disproportionately tying down enemy forces that could otherwise have been deployed against the main Schutztruppe forces in the south of the colony.

On September 30, 1915, Raben was seriously wounded by a shot in the head while inspecting a front position. He recovered only slowly due to the extremely poor food situation and severe lack of medication; Lieutenant Siegfried Kallmeyer (1885-1956) temporarily taking command of the unit.

On February 15, 1916, the siege forces contacted Raben and informed him that the main Schutztruppe contingent had entered the neutral territory of the Spanish colony of Spanish Guinea for the purpose of internment. Realizing that the situation was hopeless, Raben then negotiated favorable terms of surrender with British Brigadier Frederick Hugh Cunliffe, which also included a payment of £2000 for the wages of the Askari, and Raben surrendered on February 18, 1916.

Raben was a British prisoner of war until December 1916, but was then interned in Arosa, Switzerland and finally brought to Germany as an exchange prisoner on August 3, 1917. He was then promoted to Major on January 27, 1918, and at the same time transferred to the command of the Schutztruppe at the Imperial Colonial Office in Berlin. In September 1918, he took part in a machine gun course in Döberitz. He was retired on September 19, 1919. Based on decree by Reichswehr Minister Gustav Noske he also had a respective pension and permission to continue to wear his uniform.

Nothing is known about the last years of his life, but he doesn't appear to have been politically active. Raben died at the age of just 46; possibly from his war injuries.

=== Legacy ===
French filmmaker Jean-Jacques Annaud credited the idea for his film Black and White in Color on a passage in the manuscript L'Histoire Gènérale du Cameroun which it reads: "a Major von Rabben [sic!] who was immortalized by his heroic resistance against Allied forces in the glorious Battle of Mora during World War I".
