= Mora, Cameroon =

Mora
- Location in Cameroon
- Coordinates: 11°03′N 14°09′E
- Country: Cameroon
- Province: Far North Province
- Elevation: 455 m (1,493 ft)

Population (2012)
  - Total: 53,667
- Time zone: WAT

Mora is a town in northern Cameroon. Mora has a population of 55,216 making it the 5th biggest city in Far North.

The German fort of Mora was the last German fort in Cameroon to surrender during World War I. After a long time under siege, Captain Ernst von Raben and his men surrendered to the allied forces on February 20, 1916, over a year after the rest of the German army withdrew out of Cameroon. Many German troops escaped to the neutral Spanish colony of Río Muni.

== Gallery ==
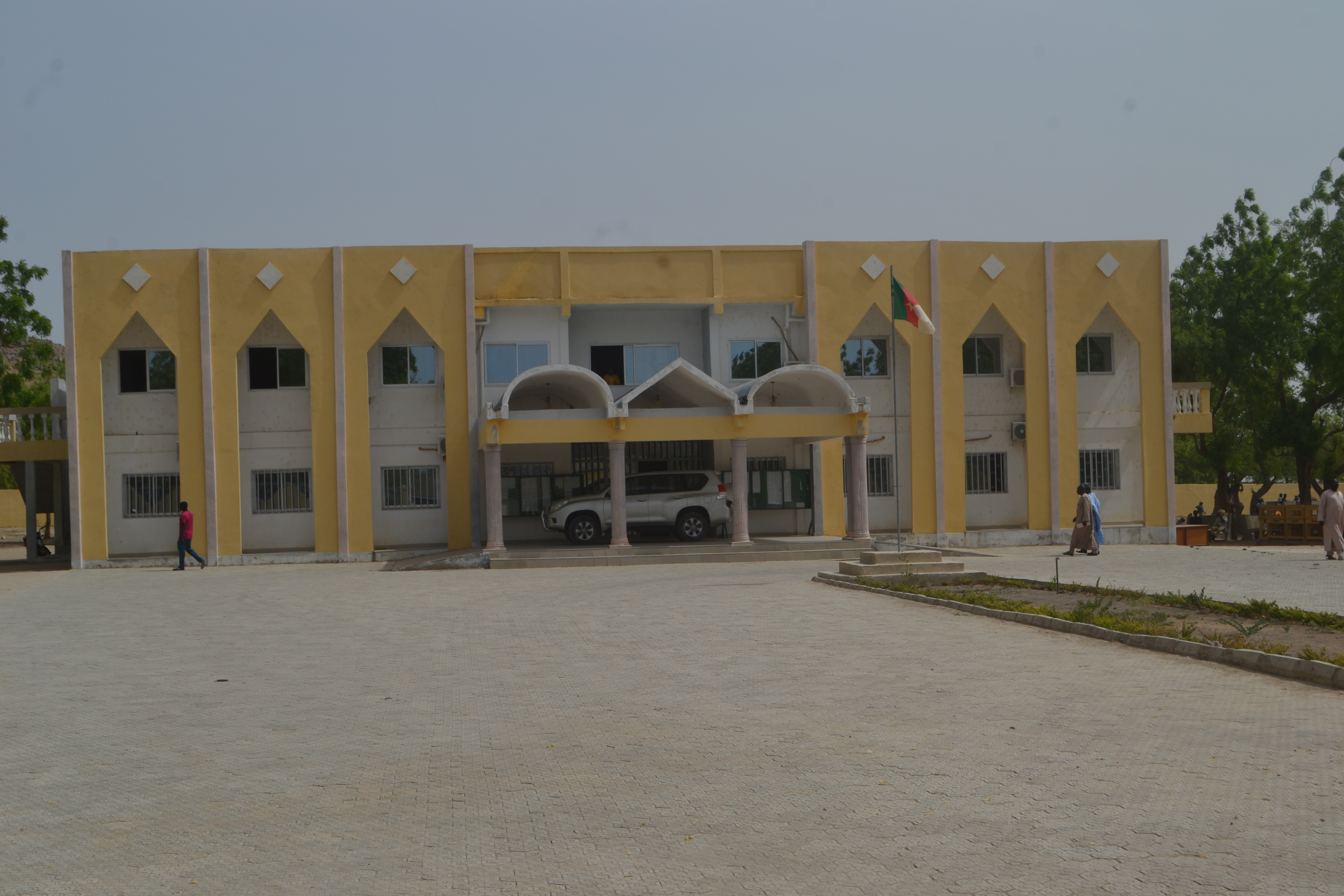
Mora City hall

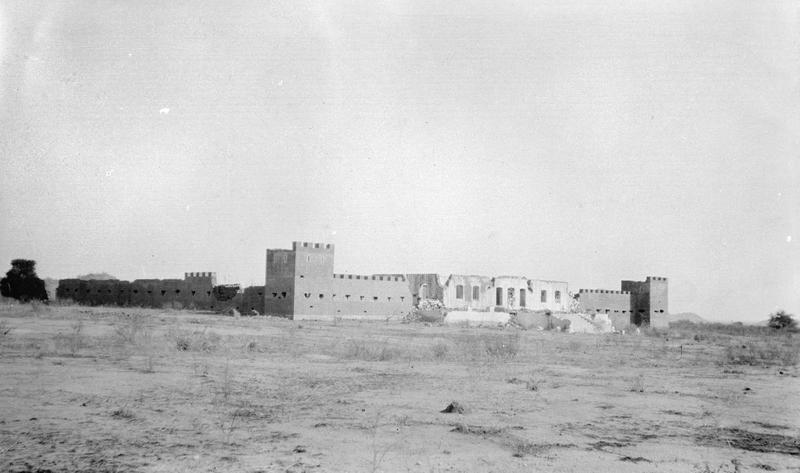
Exterior of German Fort near Mora, 1916.

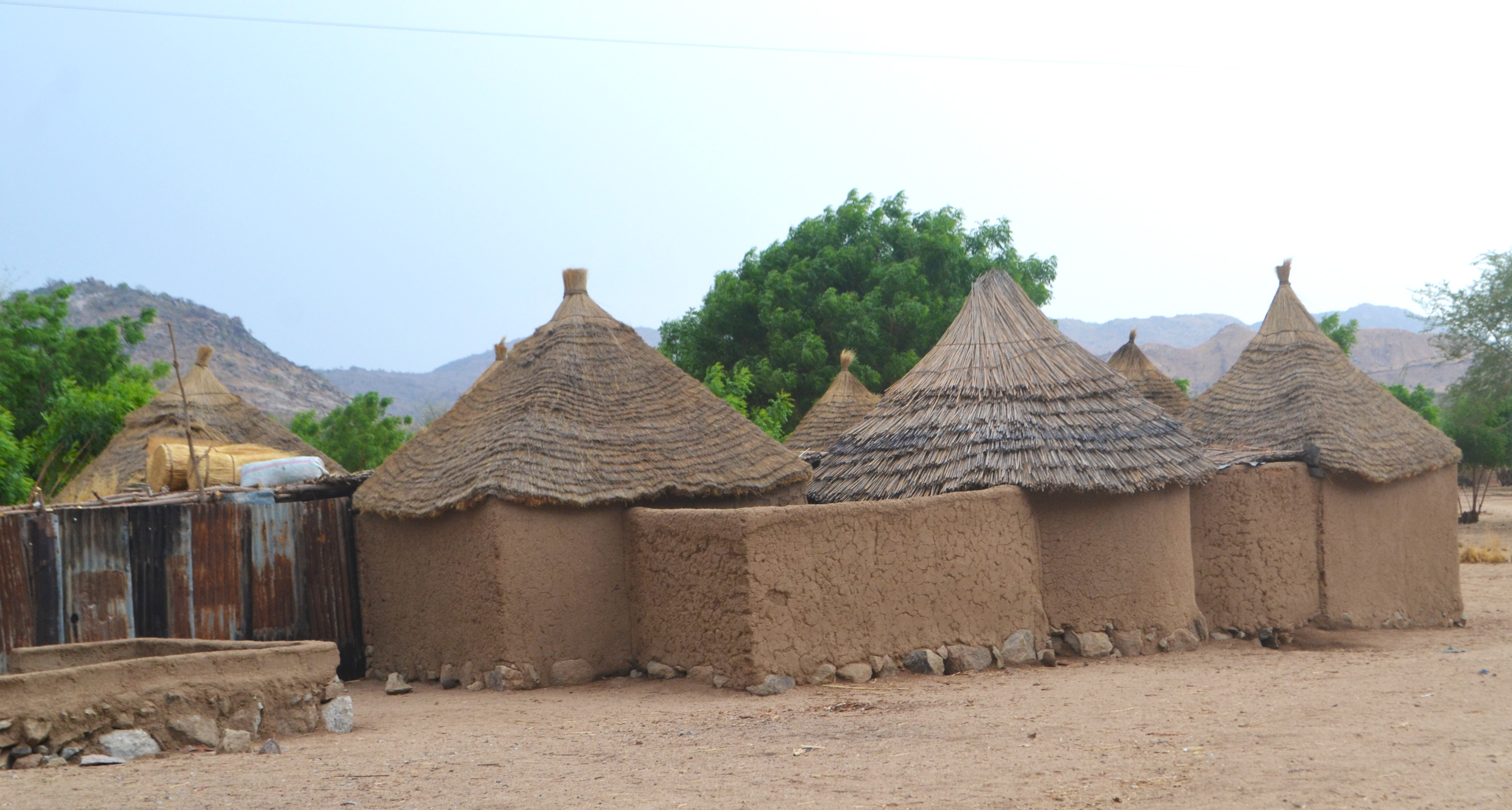
Case d'habitation

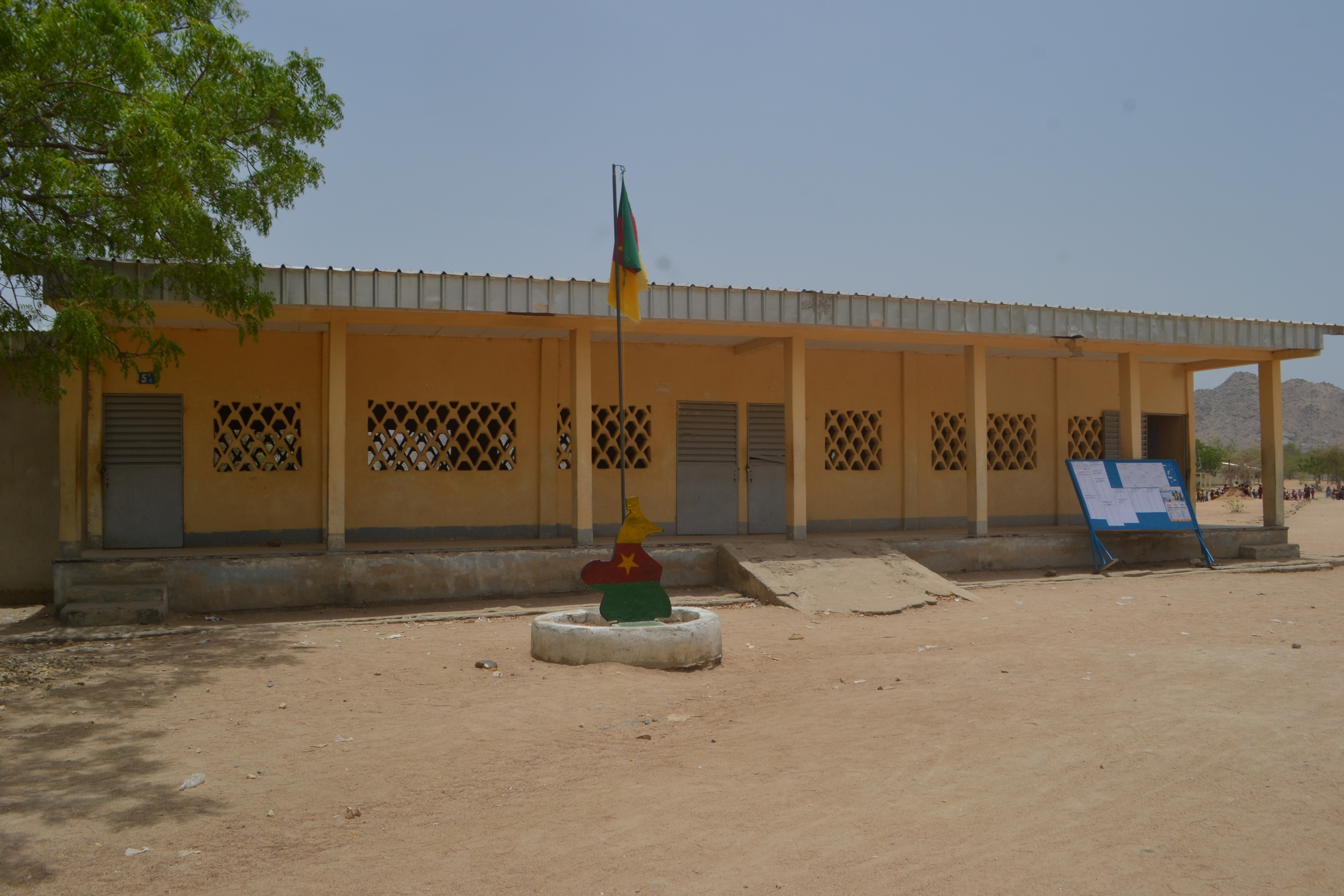
Mora Bilingual High School

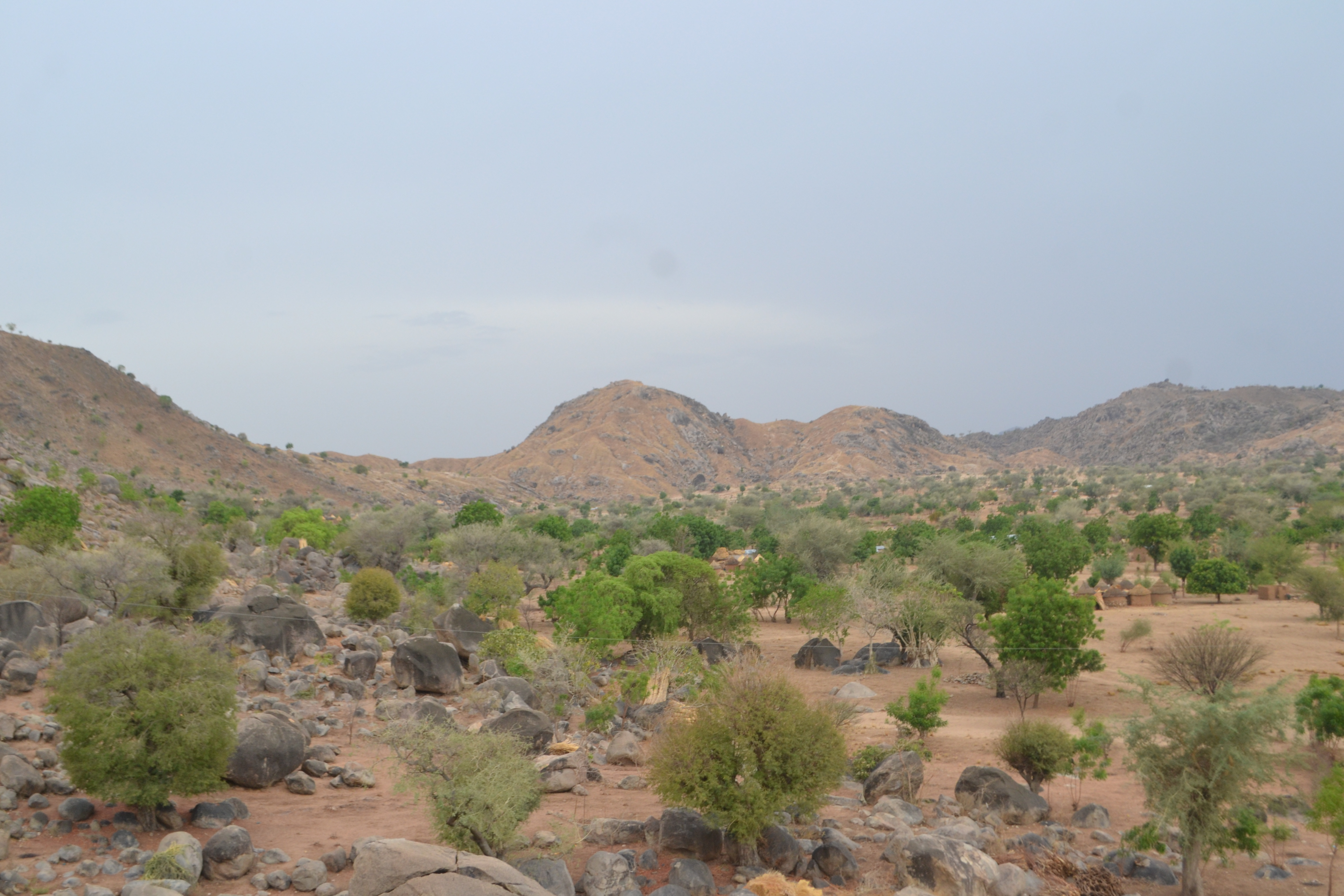
Mandara Mountains view from Mora

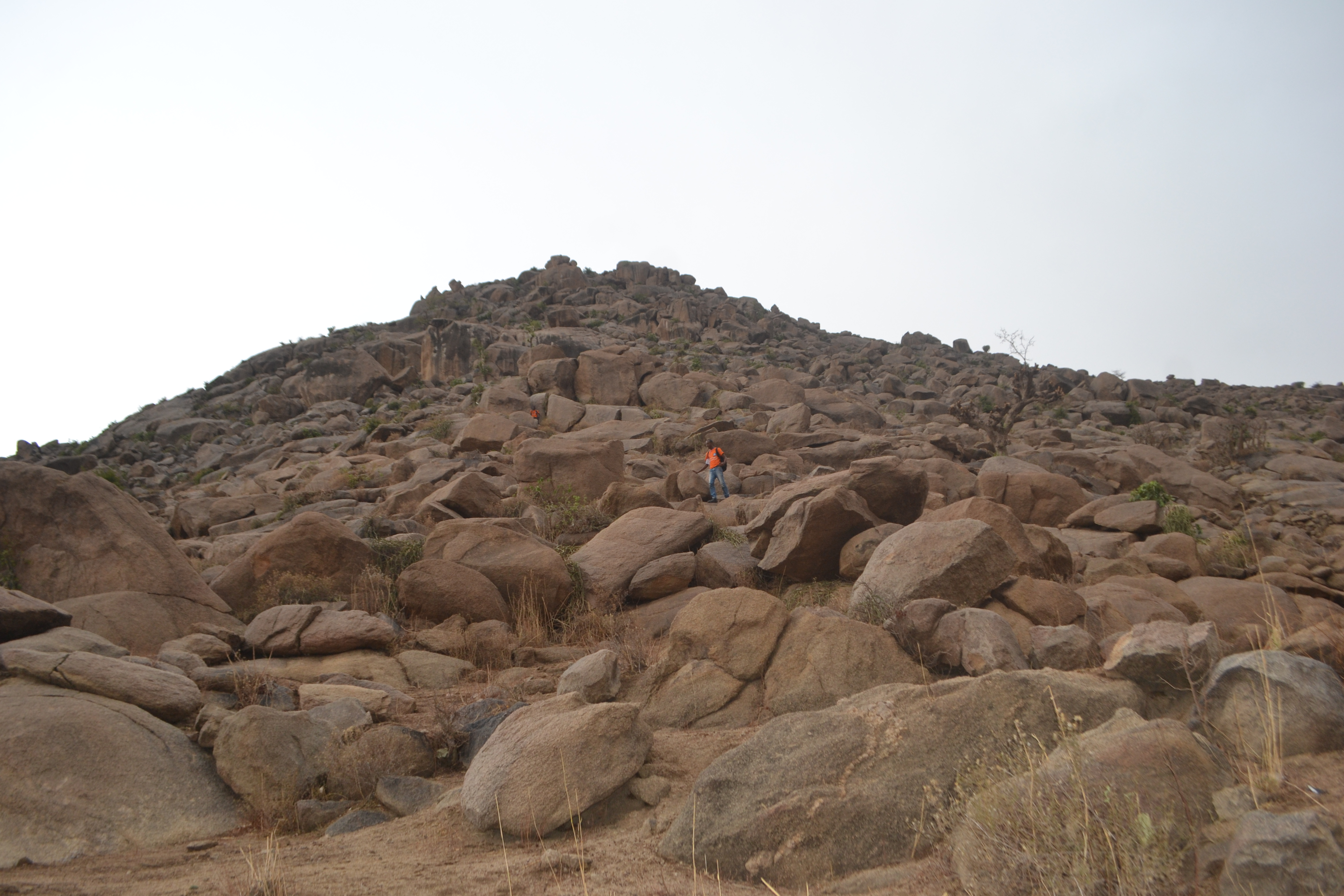
Rocky mountains in Mora

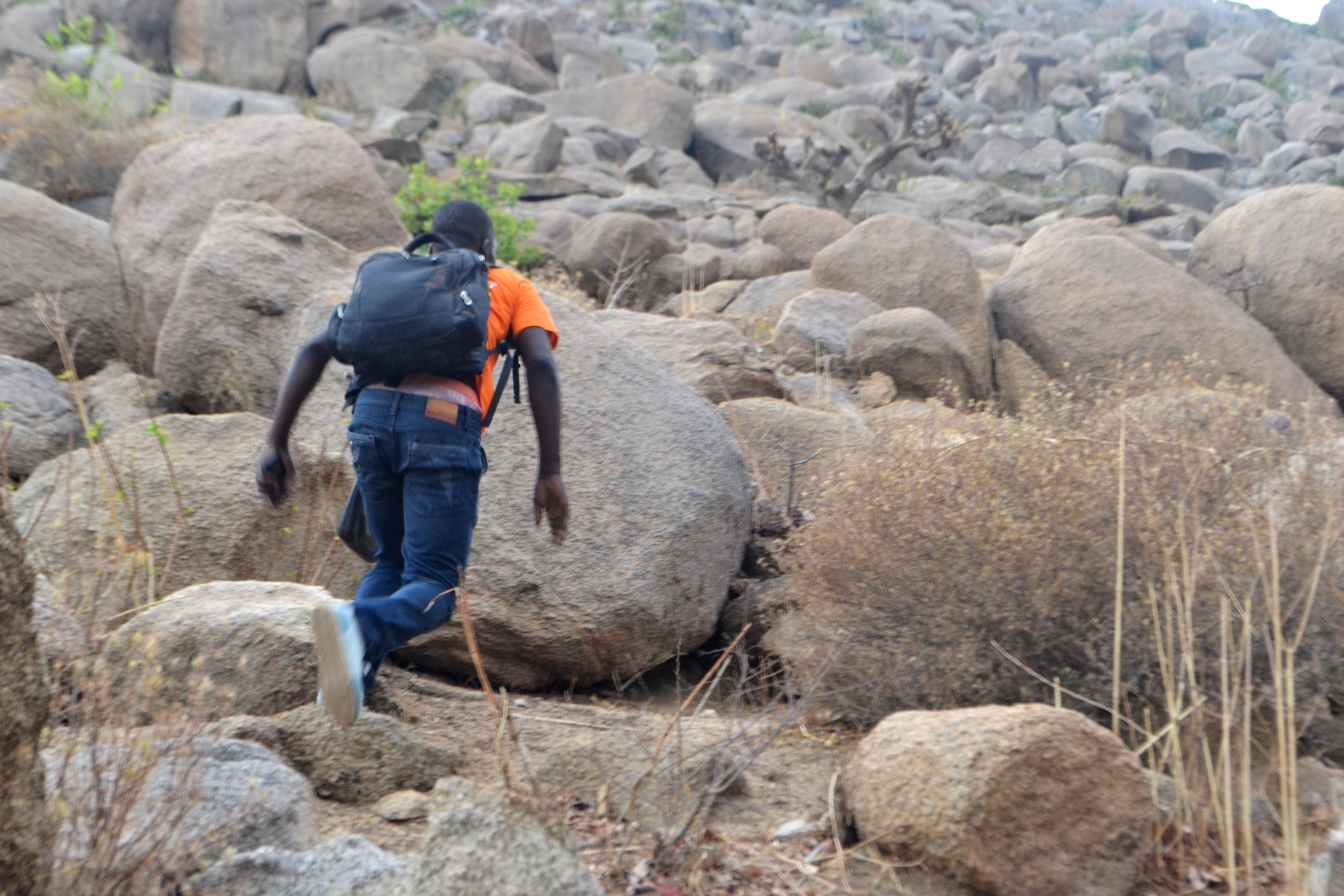
Hiking in Mora

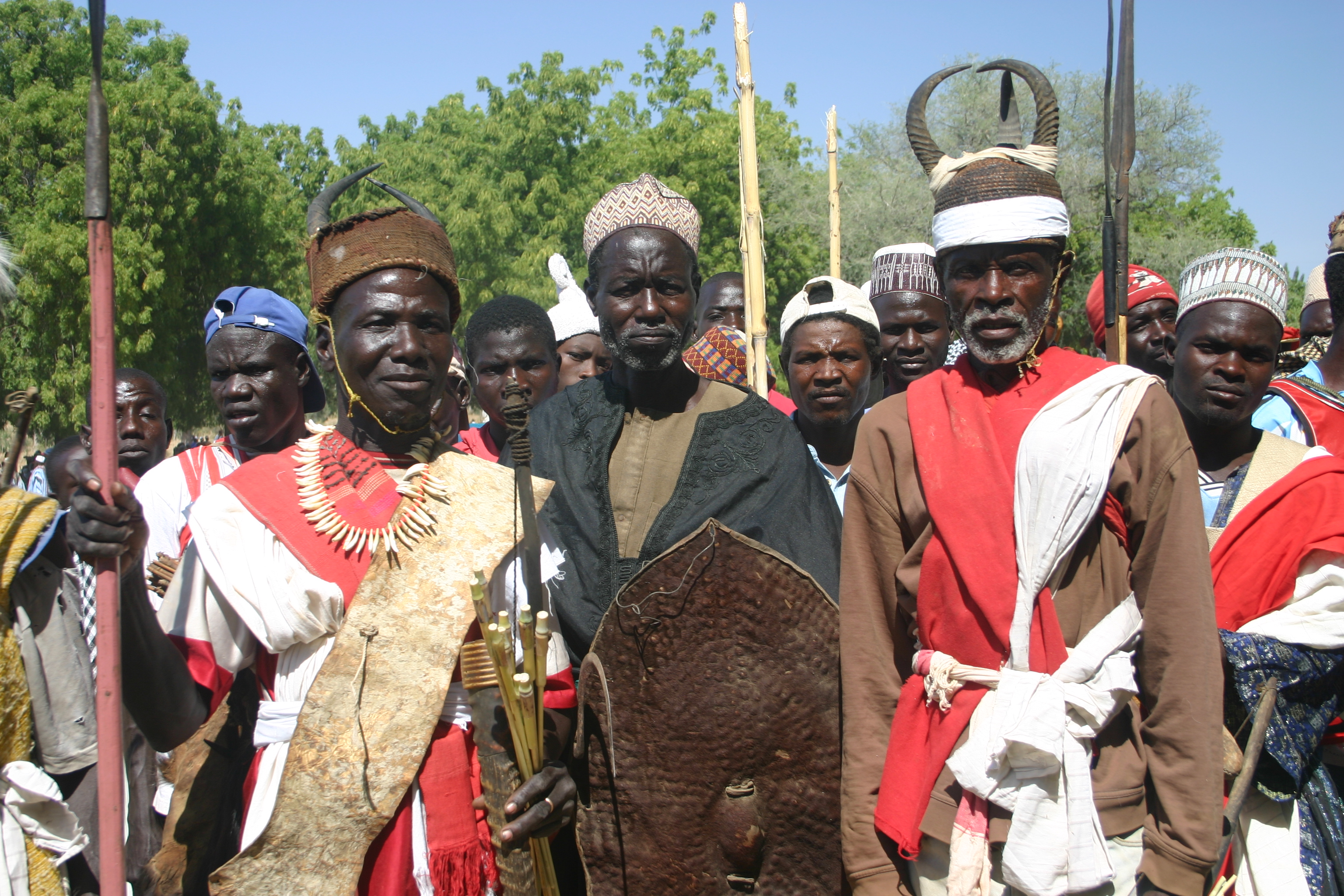
Podoko warriors (Mora)

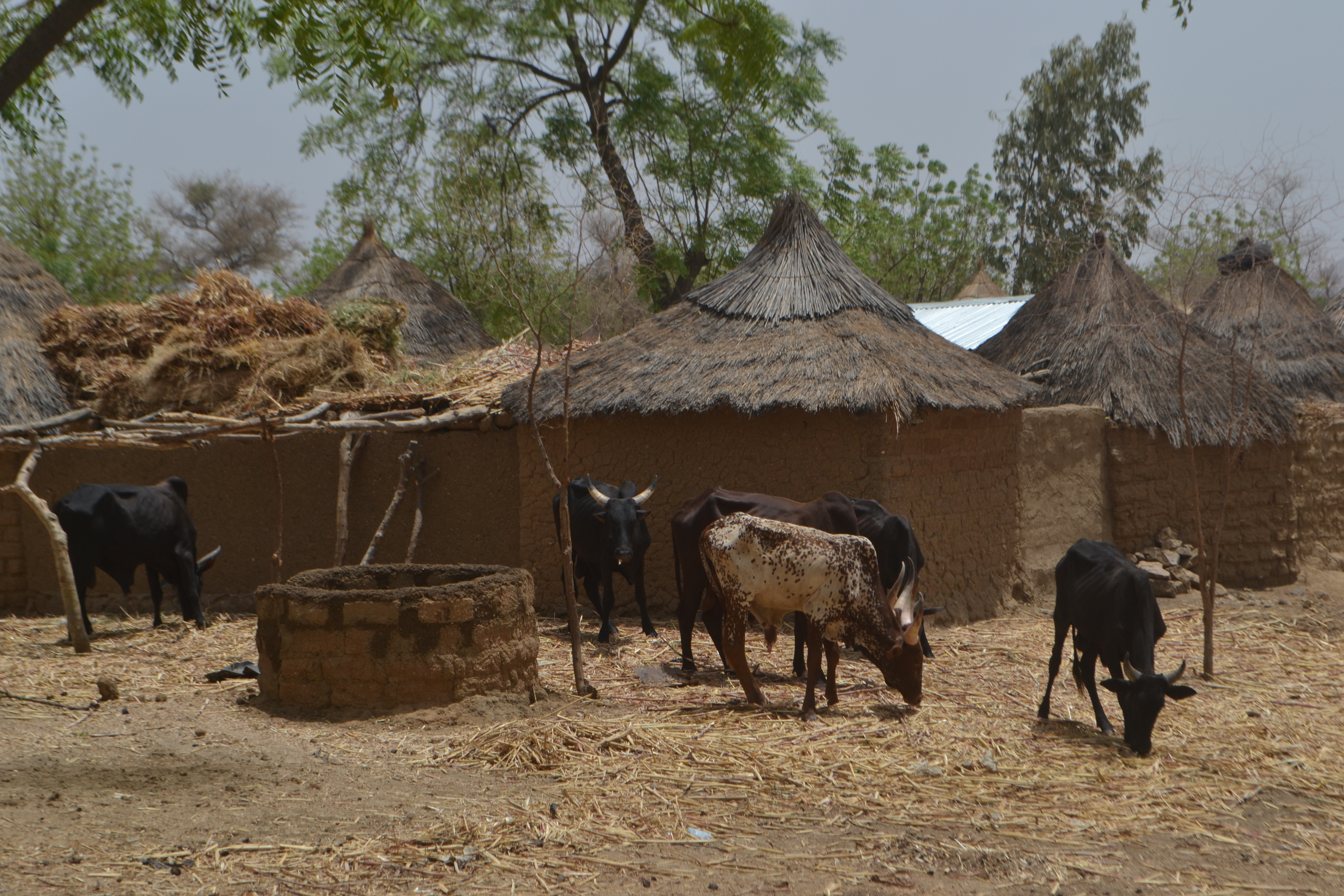
A hut in Mora
