= September 1914 =

Month of 1914

<<	September 1914					>>
Su	Mo	Tu	We	Th	Fr	Sa
		1	2	3	4	5
6	7	8	9	10	11	12
13	14	15	16	17	18	19
20	21	22	23	24	25	26
27	28	29	30

The following events occurred in September 1914:

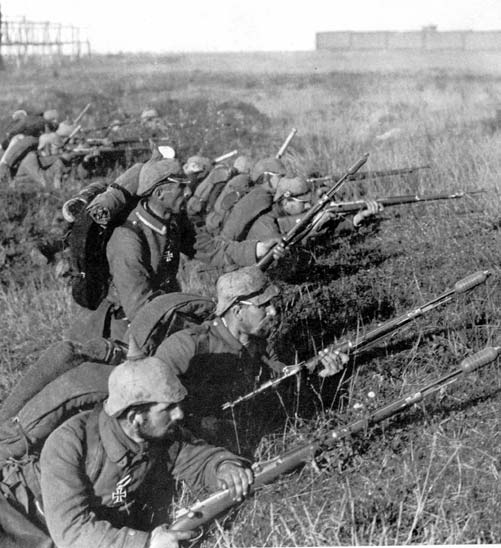
German soldiers on the front line at the First Battle of the Marne.

== September 1, 1914 (Tuesday) ==
- Due to war with Germany, Saint Petersburg in Russia changed its name to Petrograd, meaning "Peter's City", to remove the German words Sankt and Burg.
- British Field Marshal Herbert Kitchener met with General John French, commander of the British Expeditionary Force following the Battle of Le Cateau at a midnight ministers that included French Prime Minister René Viviani and War Minister Alexandre Millerand. The two British generals at one point excused themselves to talk privately, and while no record of their conversation was kept, it was evident months afterward the two had developed a professional hostility towards one other.
- Affair of Néry – A cavalry brigade from the retreating British Army fought a skirmish against an opposing German cavalry brigade twice their size, during the Great Retreat from Mons. The British artillery was mostly put out of action in the first few minutes, but a single gun successfully kept up a steady fire for two and a half hours against a full German battery until British reinforcements arrived. Three men of the artillery unit were awarded the Victoria Cross for their part in the battle, including Edward Kinder Bradbury who died from wounds during the battle. The battery itself was later awarded the honour title of "Néry", the only British Army unit to have this as a battle honour.
- Zaian War – The Zayanes called off their siege on the French-held colonial town of Khenifra, Morocco, resulting in an "armed peace" that lasted until November.
- Martial law was declared in Butte, Montana, after local law enforcement failed to quell ongoing labor violence between rival mining groups in the town. Around 500 National Guard were called in to regain order. A state district court later ordered the town's mayor and sheriff to be fired from their positions for dereliction of duty, and new leadership was appointed.
- The British 3rd Cavalry Division was established under the command of Major-General the Hon. Julian Byng and remained active until 1919.
- The 2nd Light Horse Brigade of the First Australian Imperial Force was established in Sydney, with the 5th, 6th, 7th, 8th, 9th Light Horse Regiments in support.
- The 14th, 15th and 17th Battalions for the Canadian Expeditionary Force were established.
- The "Corps Eberhardt" of the Imperial Germany Army was established to defend the Alsace-Lorraine region bordering Germany and France. It was renamed the XV Royal Bavarian Reserve Corps in 1916.
- The Imperial Japanese Navy seaplane carrier Wakamiya arrived off Kiaochow Bay, China, to participate in operations during the Siege of Tsingtao. It was the first combat deployment of an aviation ship by any country.
- Gertrude I. Johnson and Mary T. Wales founded the Johnson & Wales Business School in Providence, Rhode Island, with a single student. It eventually grew to become Johnson & Wales University with four campuses across the United States.
- The last known passenger pigeon "Martha" died in the Cincinnati Zoo.
- The poem "August, 1914" by John Masefield was published in the September 1 issue of The English Review, the first piece of literature written about World War I.
- The town of Mission Beach, Queensland, Australia was established.
- Died: George Henry Morris, 42, Irish military officer, first commanding officer to lead an Irish Guards battalion into battle; killed in action during the Great Retreat (b. 1872)

== September 2, 1914 (Wednesday) ==
- Japan landed between 15,000 and 20,000 troops at Longkou, China, north of the German-control Chinese port of Tsingtao in preparation to lay siege to the port, even though it violated China's neutrality.
- The French village of Moronvilliers, 15 kilometers northeast from Rheims, was occupied by German troops. Because it was situated on what became the Western Front, the village was deserted and destroyed during the war.
- The Accrington Pals were established as part of Kitchener's Army in Accrington, England.
- The 2nd Mounted Division of the British Army was established.
- The British territorial mounted artillery brigades, the I Brigade and II Brigade, were established in Egypt from existing mounted brigades and artillery.
- The 1st, 2nd, 3rd, 4th, 7th, 10th, 13th, 16th, and 20th Battalions were established for the Canadian Expeditionary Force and deployed to Europe on October 14.
- Charles Masterman invited 25 "eminent literary men" to Wellington House in London to form a secret British war propaganda bureau. Those who attend include William Archer, Arnold Bennett, G. K. Chesterton, Arthur Conan Doyle, Ford Madox Ford, John Galsworthy, Thomas Hardy, Rudyard Kipling, John Masefield, Henry Newbolt, Gilbert Parker, G. M. Trevelyan and H. G. Wells.
- Born:
  - George Brown, British politician, served as Deputy Leader of the Labour Party from 1960 to 1970; in London, England (d. 1985)
  - Fred Ruiz Castro, Filipino judge, 12th Chief Justice of the Supreme Court of the Philippines from 1976 to 1979; in Laoag, Philippine Islands (present-day Philippines) (d. 1979)
- Died: John de Villiers, 72, South African judge, first Chief Justice of South Africa from 1874 to 1914 (b. 1842)

== September 3, 1914 (Thursday) ==
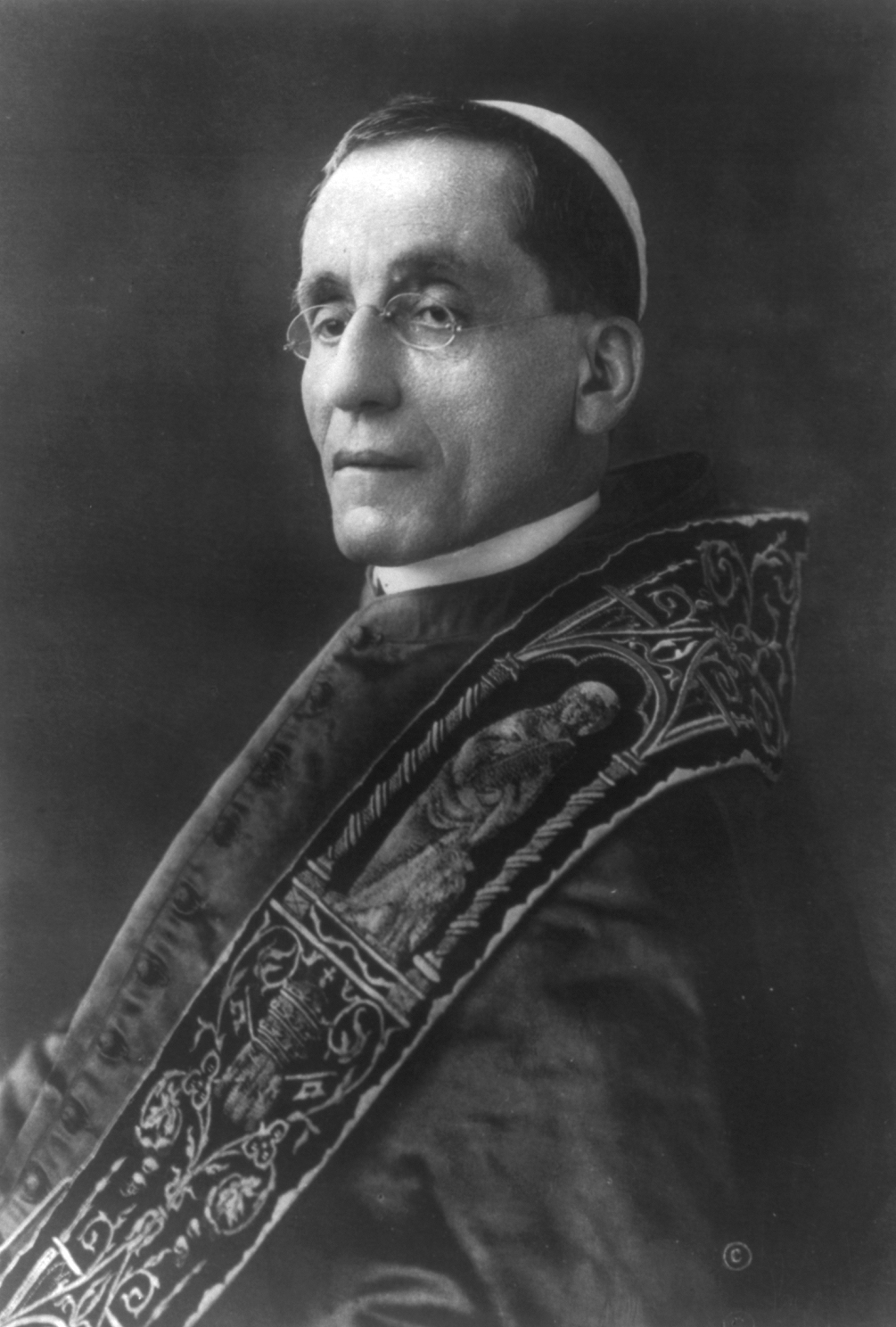
Pope Benedict XV

- Pope Benedict XV (Giacomo della Chiesa) succeeded Pope Pius X as the 258th pope.
- Prince William of Albania left the country after just six months due to opposition to his rule.
- Battle of Rawa – The Russian Fifth Army under command of Paul von Plehwe exploited a gap in the Austrian-Hungarian defense line when the Austro-Hungarian Fourth Army was ordered south to aid the Third Army, which had suffered heavy casualties.
- Royal Navy torpedo gunboat HMS Speedy struck a mine and sank in the North Sea along with a naval trawler, with the loss of one of her 91 crew (the other boat lost another five crew).
- The 63rd Naval Infantry Division was established as the main infantry unit for the Royal Navy.
- Sioux County, North Dakota was established by proclamation of Governor Louis B. Hanna and named after the Sioux Lakota that historically settled in the area.
- The Masonic Temple in Worcester, Massachusetts, was completed and dedicated by Grand Master, Most Worshipful Melvin M. Johnson. The temple was added to the National Register of Historic Places in 1980.
- Born: Dixy Lee Ray, American politician, 17th and first female Governor of Washington; as Marguerite Ray, in Tacoma, Washington, United States (d. 1994)
- Died: Albéric Magnard, 49, French composer, known for symphonies and operas including Guercœur and Bérénice; killed while defending his property from German soldiers (b. 1865)

== September 4, 1914 (Friday) ==
- Battle of Rawa – The Russian Third Army seized Lemberg in Galicia (now Poland) from Austria-Hungary.
- Battle of Grand Couronné – The German Sixth Army attacked the regrouping French Second Army in northeastern France following the Battle of the Frontiers.
- Siege of Antwerp – Spurred by news that 40,000 British troops had landed in Belgium, German forces attacked captured fortresses and blew up bridges from the Scheldt towards Termonde north of the city.
- A coal mine collapsed in Adamson, Oklahoma, killing 14 miners.
- Canadian Arctic Expedition – Captain Robert Bartlett of the Karluk met fur trader Olaf Swenson in Nome, Alaska who had chartered the schooner King and Winge for a seasonal trade run to Siberia. Bartlett requested Swensen have the ship stop by Wrangel Island in the Bering Sea and look for the stranded survivors of the Karluk shipwreck. Barlett's charter ship Bear left Nome a few days after King and Winge.
- The French Foreign Legion established 2nd and 3rd Foreign Regiments of the 1st Foreign Regiment, and 2nd Marching Regiment of the 2nd Foreign Regiment to fight for the Allies in World War I.
- The Royal Town Planning Institute was established as the principal association for urban planners in Great Britain.
- Enlistee William Henry Strahan wrote the poem "The Bugle Call" before he left for military training at Blackboy Hill, Australia. Following his death during the first day of the Gallipoli campaign in 1915, many newspapers published the verses.

== September 5, 1914 (Saturday) ==
- The Australian Labor Party led by Andrew Fisher won the Australian federal election, taking 42 out of 75 seats in the Australian House of Representatives and 31 out of 36 seats in the Australian Senate.
- Early general elections were held in Sweden for the second time that year.
- The First Battle of the Marne began when the French Sixth Army left Paris to the east and engaged cavalry patrols with the German Sixth Army at the River Ourcq.
- French general Noël de Castelnau was ordered to hold the city of Nancy, France as long as possible while French troops on the Grand Couronné repulsed German attacks.
- Royal Navy scout cruiser HMS Pathfinder was sunk by German submarine U-21 in the Firth of Forth off the coast of Scotland, with the loss of 261 sailors. It was the first ship ever to be sunk by a locomotive torpedo fired from a submarine.
- During the Siege of Tsingtao, the Imperial Japanese Navy carried out its first air combat mission. A three-seat Farman seaplane from the Wakamiya bombed German fortifications at Tsingtao, China, and conducted a reconnaissance of Kiaochow Bay.
- The German light cruiser SMS Emden, under command of Karl von Müller, was spotted in the Bay of Bengal.
- The cover of magazine London Opinion first carried the iconic drawing by Alfred Leete of Lord Kitchener with the recruiting slogan Your Country Needs You.
- The Amsterdam cricket club was established after three separate crickets clubs merged, being Volharding, RAP and Amstel, thus retaining the title of oldest active cricket club in the Netherlands.
- Born:
  - Isolina Ferré, Puerto Rican Catholic nun, recipient of the Presidential Medal of Freedom for her humanitarian work; in Ponce, Puerto Rico (d. 2000)
  - Minuetta Kessler, Russian-Canadian composer and pianist, noted piano prodigy best known for her performances with the Boston Pops Orchestra; as Minuetta Shumiatcher, in Gomel, Russian Empire (present-day Belarus) (d. 2002)
- Died: Charles Péguy, 41, French poet, known for poetry collections including The Portal of the Mystery of Hope; killed in action at the First Battle of the Marne (b. 1873)

== September 6, 1914 (Sunday) ==
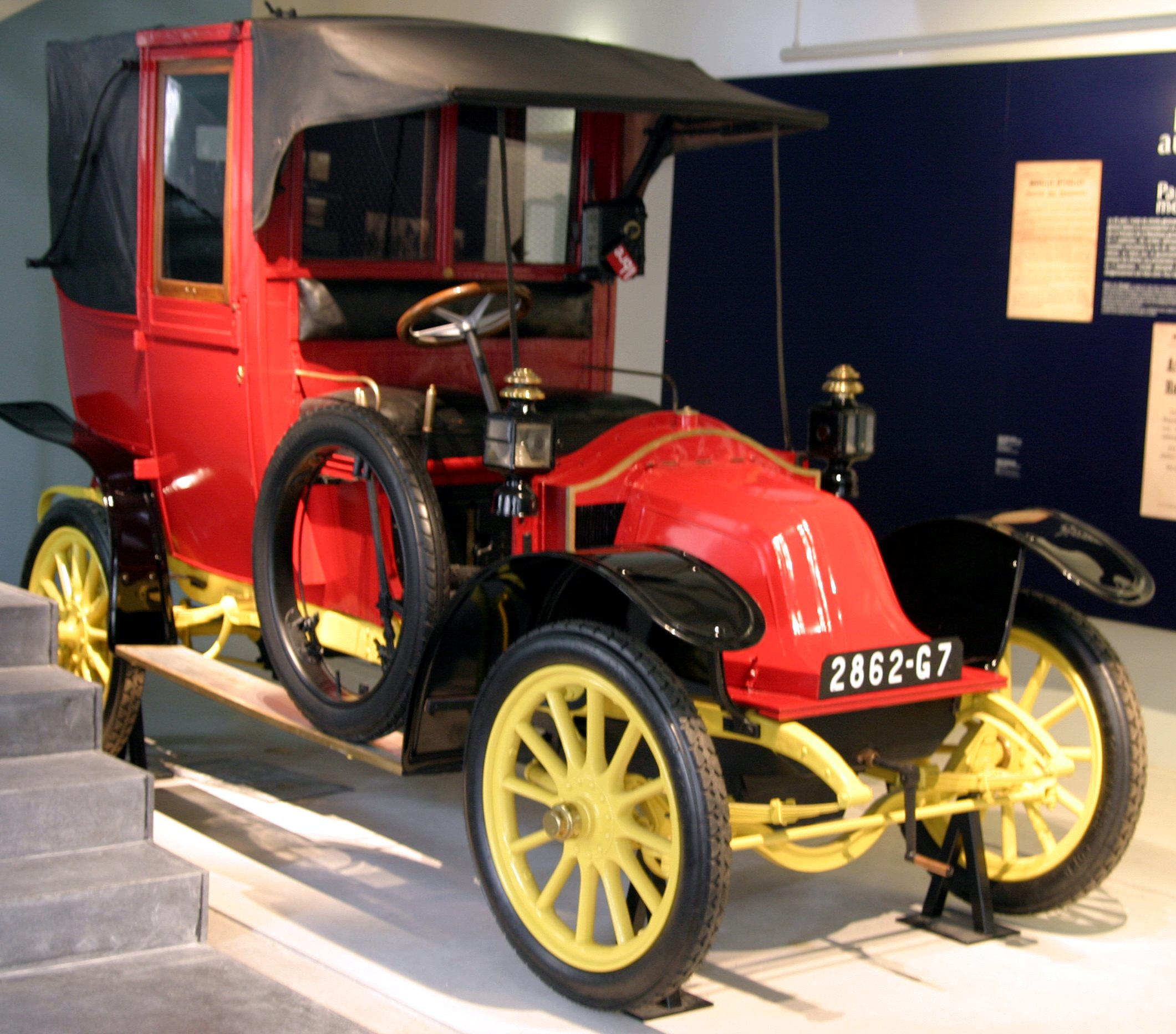
Renault Taxi de la Marne

- First Battle of the Marne – Troops from the British Expeditionary Force and the French Fifth Army crossed the Grand Morin and Petit Morin rivers in France to engage German forces.
- General Joseph Gallieni began a 3-day effort to gather about 600 taxicabs in central Paris to carry soldiers to the front fifty kilometers away. With each taxi carrying five soldiers, four in the back and one next to the driver, the fleet was able to provide 6,000 reinforcements to the front at a crucial point in the Battle of the Marne. Most taxis returned to civilian service immediately, although some remained longer to carry back the wounded and refugees. The French treasury reimbursed all taxis with a total fare of 70,012 francs.
- Battle of Drina – The Serbian Second Army repelled an initial offense by the Austro-Hungarian Fifth Army at the Drina River, but the stronger 6th Army managed to surprise the Serbian Third Army and gained a foothold into Serbian territory.
- The Siege of Maubeuge in France ended when the fortress's defenders surrendered to German forces after several days of shelling.
- German colonial forces attacked British troops defending Nsanakong in German Cameroon, forcing them to retreat over the border into Nigeria with 100 casualties.
- The first air-sea battle in history occurred between Imperial Japanese Navy seaplanes and German and Austro-Hungarian ships in Kiaochow Bay during the Siege of Tsingtao.
- The Bohemian National Alliance was established in Chicago to advocate support of the independent state of Czechoslovakia from Austria-Hungary.
- The Indonesian Islamic organization Al-Irshad Al-Islamiya was established with the first Al-Irshad school in Batavia, Dutch East Indies.
- Died: Alfred Mayssonnié, 30, French rugby player, scrum-half and fly-half for the France national rugby union team from 1908 to 1910; killed at the First Battle of the Marne (b. 1884)

== September 7, 1914 (Monday) ==
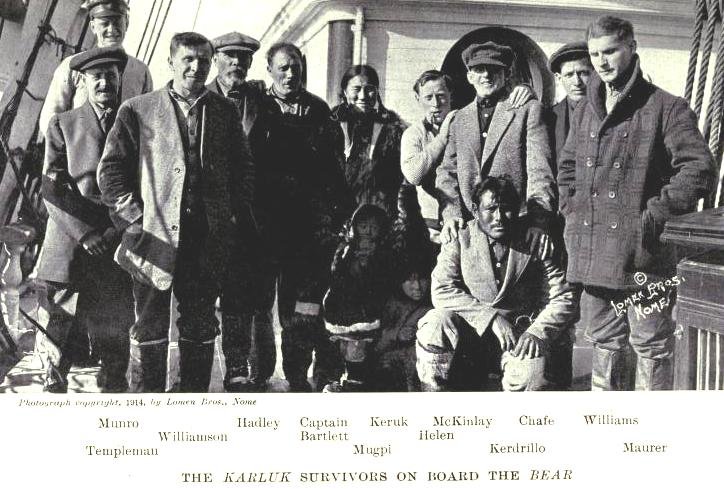
Survivors of the Karluk shortly after their rescue in the Arctic.

- Battle of Grand Couronné – German attacks drove French defenders back south of Verdun, France, which threatened to separate the French Second and Third Armies. General Noël Castelnau requested to retreat from Nancy again but ordered to hold the city for another 24 hours.
- First Battle of the Masurian Lakes – The German Eighth Army under command of Paul von Hindenburg began attacking the Russian First Army under command of Paul von Rennenkampf in East Prussia.
- The German cruiser SMS Nürnberg destroyed a cable relay station on Fanning Island (now Tabuaeran) in the Pacific Ocean, in what became known as the Fanning Raid.
- Canadian Arctic Expedition – The trading schooner King and Winge reached Wrangel Island in the Bering Sea and found 14 of the original 25 survivors of the Karluk shipwreck onshore to meet them. They were rapidly transferred to the ship and then sailed to Herald Island to search for another party that had ventured out there in February, but were forced to turn back because of ice. The ship rendezvoused with the Bear days later and the crew was reunited with Captain Robert Bartlett.
- The 1st Hull Heavy Battery of the Royal Garrison Artillery was established to serve in Kitchener's Army.
- The Royal Navy established the Admiral Commanding for the Orkneys and Shetlands for the North Sea with Stanley Colville as the first commander.
- Actor Dustin Farnum reprised his successful 1904 stage role of The Virginian, based upon the 1902 novel by Owen Wister, in the first screen adaptation of the western directed by Cecil B. DeMille.
- Association football club Tombense was established in Tombos, Brazil.
- The novel Aunt Jane's Nieces in the Red Cross by L. Frank Baum opens on September 7, 1914, where main characters Patsy Doyle and Beth De Graf of the Aunt Jane's Nieces series and their uncle John Merrick read a newspaper account of the end of the Siege of Maubeuge and the German victory. The German victory concern the girls and motivates them to help out with the war effort.
- Born:
  - James Van Allen, American physicist, detected the existence of the Van Allen radiation belt surrounding Earth; in Mount Pleasant, Iowa, United States (d. 2006)
  - Jean Blackwell Hutson, American librarian and curator, chief of the Schomburg Center for Research in Black Culture; as Jean Blackwell, in Summerfield, Florida, United States (d. 1998)
  - Mandy Mitchell-Innes, English cricketer, batsman for the England cricket team and Somerset County Cricket Club from 1931 to 1949; as Norman Stewart Mitchell-Innes, in Calcutta, British India (present-day Kolkata, India) (d. 2006)
  - Lída Baarová, Czech-Austrian actress, mistress to Nazi propaganda minister Joseph Goebbels; as Ludmila Babková, in Prague, Kingdom of Bohemia, Austria-Hungary (present-day Czech Republic) (d. 2000)
- Died: Peter O'Brien, 72, Irish judge, Lord Chief Justice of Ireland from 1889 to 1913 (b. 1842)

== September 8, 1914 (Tuesday) ==
- First Battle of the Marne – The French Fifth Army launched a surprise attack against the German Second Army, further widening the 50-kilometer gap between the First and Second German Armies. With the two German command posts now unable to communicate with each other, both commanding officers met and agreed the German Second Army was in danger of encirclement and should retreat immediately.
- Battle of Grand Couronné – The German offensive began to wane and French forces were able to start retaking lost ground.
- Pope Benedict XV held his first consistory in the Vatican.
- Major General Julian Byng was replaced by General J. Maxwell to command the Force in Egypt, whose primary objective was to protect the Suez Canal from the Central Powers.
- Private Thomas Highgate became the first British soldier to be executed for desertion during World War I.
- The British ocean liner RMS Oceanic ran aground on a reef off the island of Foula of the Shetland Islands due to a navigational error. All passengers and crew were rescued but the ship was swallowed by the sea during a storm the following day. The wreck received little public exposure due to the controversy of crew incompetence surrounding the wreck.
- John D. Rockefeller and his wife Laura Spelman Rockefeller celebrated their 50th wedding anniversary at their home in Pocantico Hills, New York, two days before Laura's 75th birthday. It would be their last anniversary as Laura would pass away March 12, 1915.
- The stage comedy It Pays to Advertise by Roi Cooper Megrue and Walter Hackett premiered on Broadway and ran a full year in New York City.
- Born:
  - B. P. Koirala, Nepalese state leader, 22nd Prime Minister of Nepal; as Bishweshwar Prasad Koirala, in Benares, British India (present-day Varanasi, India) (d. 1982)
  - Denys Lasdun, British architect, best known for the Royal National Theatre; in London, England (d. 2001)
- Died:
  - William Lofland Dudley, 55, American chemist, developed the refining process for iridium (b. 1859)
  - William Erasmus Darwin, 74, son of Charles Darwin, major subject in Darwin's studies on developmental psychology (b. 1839)

== September 9, 1914 (Wednesday) ==
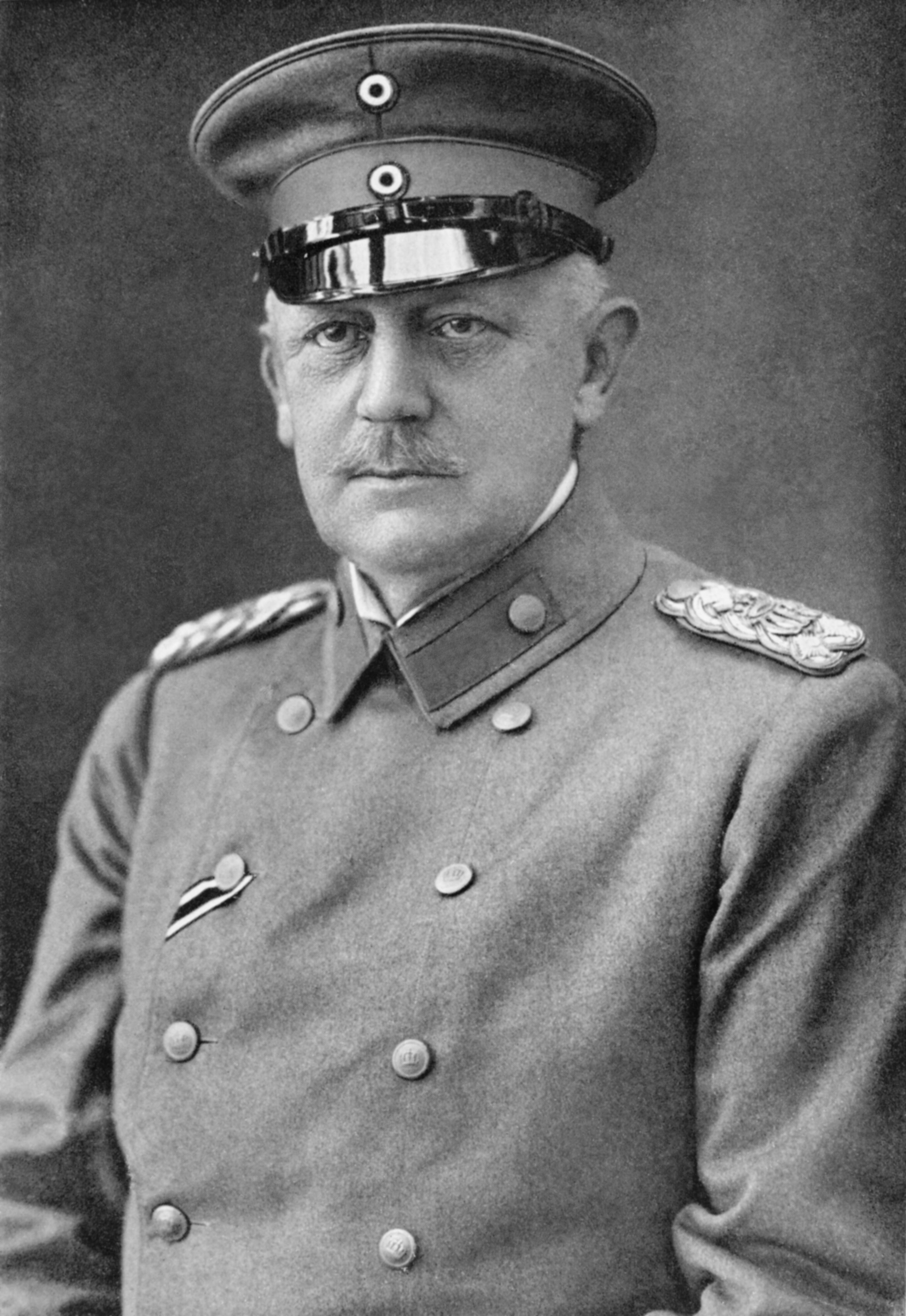
Helmuth von Moltke, Chief of the German General Staff.

- German Chancellor Theobald von Bethmann Hollweg laid out Germany's war aims in the Septemberprogramm, as drafted by his private secretary, Kurt Riezler. Assuming a quick and decisive victory over France, the plan proposed making vassal states of Belgium and France and seizing much land from the Russian Empire in Eastern Europe.
- Chief of the Imperial German General Staff Helmuth von Moltke suffered a nervous breakdown upon hearing German forces were retreating from the Marne. It was alleged later that he told Kaiser Wilhelm II "Your Majesty, we have lost the war!" although historians including Winston Churchill were uncertain that it had actually happened.
- Siege of Antwerp – Belgian troops attacked Germany's eastern flank, capturing key river crossings and the town of Aarschot east of the city.
- Battle of Bita Paka – Australian occupation of German New Guinea began with HMAS Melbourne capturing instead of destroying a wireless station on Nauru after it was found abandoned.
- The Taylor County Courthouse was officially opened in Medford, Wisconsin to replace the original courthouse built in 1876. It was added to the National Register of Historic Places in 1980.
- Hilaire Belloc was contracted to write regular articles on the War in the new British weekly Land and Water.
- The period drama Break, Break, Break was released, starring William Garwood and Louise Lester as mid-Victorian lovers, and directed by Harry A. Pollard.
- Iron Davis of the Boston Braves pitched a no-hitter during the second game of a doubleheader against the Philadelphia Phillies, resulting in a 7–0 win.
- Born:
  - Victor Tennekoon, Sri Lankan judge, 35th Chief Justice of Sri Lanka; in Central Province, British Ceylon (present-day Sri Lanka) (d. 2007)
  - Alexander Cordell, Welsh writer, author of the Mortymer Saga which included Rape of the Fair Country, Hosts of Rebecca and Song of the Earth; as George Alexander Graber, in Colombo, British Ceylon (present-day Sri Lanka) (d. 1997)
  - Seymour Heller, American talent agent, best known for being the agent for Liberace; in Cleveland, United States (d. 2001)
- Died: Robert Napuʻuako Boyd, 50, Hawaiian revolutionary leader, member of the failed Wilcox rebellion (b. 1864)

== September 10, 1914 (Thursday) ==
- German forces retreated from Verdun to the Aisne River in northeastern France.
- Siege of Antwerp – Belgian cavalry reached the city of Leuven, Belgium.
- Rebel forces captured the city of Durrës, capital of Albania, a week after Prince William abdicated the throne.
- The units that would eventually make up the 22nd, 23rd, 24th, 25th, 26th, and 27th Reserve Corps of the Imperial German Army were established, including the 43rd, 44th, 45th, 46th, 47th, 48th, 49th, 50th, 51st, 52nd, 53rd, 54th, and the 6th Bavarian Reserve Division which Adolf Hitler served through much of the war.
- The German light cruiser SMS Emden moved into the main shipping route between India and Ceylon began capturing or sinking half a dozen merchant ships, starting with the Indus. The Royal Navy began ordering ships in the Indian Ocean to hunt down the cruiser.
- Born:
  - Robert Wise, American film director and producer, recipient of the Academy Award for Best Director and Best Picture for West Side Story and The Sound of Music; in Winchester, Indiana, United States (d. 2005)
  - Terence O'Neill, Irish state leader, 4th Prime Minister of Northern Ireland; in London, England (d. 1990)
- Died: Neil Douglas Findlay, 55, British army officer, commander of the 1st Infantry Division, recipient of the Order of the Bath, first British general to be killed in World War I (b. 1859)

== September 11, 1914 (Friday) ==
- Austro-Hungarian forces were defeated at the Battle of Rawa, sustaining some 50,000 casualties and 70,000 men taken prisoner, while the victorious Russian force sustained 60,000 casualties. However, the Central Powers retook Rawa on June 21, 1915.
- First Battle of the Masurian Lakes – Reinforcements bolstered the German Eighth Army, allowed them to push the Russian First Army back to a line running from Insterburg to Angerburg in East Prussia.
- Battle of Bita Paka – Australian troops from the cruiser HMAS Sydney landed at the port Rabaul in German New Guinea while the destroyer HMAS Warrego landed small parties to capture other small settlements with strategically placed wireless stations.
- British tanker Elsinore was shelled and sunk in the Pacific Ocean off Mexico by German warship SMS Leipzig.
- The 14th, 15th, 16th, 17th, 18th, 19th 20th, 21st, 22nd, 23rd, 24th, 25th, 26th Infantry Divisions of Kitchener's Army were established.
- Born:
  - Pavle, Serbian religious leader, 44th Serbian Patriarch; as Gojko Stojčević, in Kućanci, Kingdom of Croatia-Slavonia, Austria-Hungary (present-day Croatia) (d. 2009)
  - Guglielmo Achille Cavellini, Italian artist, leading promoter of abstract art in Italy; in Brescia, Kingdom of Italy (present-day Italy)) (d. 1990)
  - Manlio Di Rosa, Italian fencer, two-time gold and silver medalist at the 1936, 1948, 1952 and 1956 Summer Olympics; in Livorno, Kingdom of Italy (present-day Italy) (d. 1989)
- Died: Mircea Demetriade, 53, Romanian poet, early member of the Symbolist movement in Romania (b. 1861)

== September 12, 1914 (Saturday) ==
- The First Battle of the Marne ended after the German armies retreated 90 kilometres (56 mi) to the River Aisne. French forces in pursuit captured 11,717 German soldiers, 30 artillery pieces and 100 machine-guns while British forces captured another 3,500 German soldiers. The defeat was so complete that many historians believed it forced the German Army to abandon its Schlieffen Plan.
- First Battle of the Masurian Lakes – German forces captured Gumbinnen (now Gusev) as Russian forces retreated.
- The Armistead Monument to General George Armistead was unveiled at Fort McHenry, Baltimore.
- Born:
  - Desmond Llewelyn, Welsh actor, best known for his role as Q in 17 of the James Bond films; in Newport, Wales (killed in auto accident, 1999)
  - Janusz Żurakowski, Polish-Canadian fighter and test pilot, first test pilot of the Avro Arrow; in Ryzawka, Russian Empire (present-day Ukraine) (d. 2004)

== September 13, 1914 (Sunday) ==
- Although the General Electoral League received the most votes in the Swedish general election, the Swedish Social Democratic Party emerged as the largest party, winning 87 of the 230 seats in the Second Chamber.
- First Battle of the Aisne – The British Expeditionary Force and the French Fifth Army crossed the Aisne at night under the cover of fog to partially demolish bridges and capture key ridges for an offensive against German forces.
- French forces recaptured the villages Pont-à-Mousson and Lunéville without opposition to end the Battle of Grand Couronné in France. With the French armies closing up to the Seille River, the Battle of the Frontiers ended with the northeast segment of the Western Front stabilized until 1918.
- First Battle of the Masurian Lakes – The town of Stallupönen (now Nesterov) fell to German forces in East Prussia as Russian resistance deteriorated.
- Siege of Antwerp – Successful campaigns and German troops regrouping to bolster offensives in northern France allowed Belgian forces to return to Antwerp.
- The British sub HMS E9 sank the German aviso SMS Hela with all but two of her 178 crew captured. It was the first German ship sunk by a British sub in World War I.
- Former British diplomat and Irish nationalist Roger Casement met with German diplomat Franz von Papen in Washington D.C. to seek Germany's support in an independent Ireland from Great Britain.
- Canadian Arctic Expedition – The last survivors of the Karluk arrived in Nome, Alaska with most of the town out to greet them. In all, 14 out of the 25 that survived the sinking in January were accounted for. Three men were confirmed dead during the wait on Wrangel Island in the Bering Sea, another four were believed to have perished on the ice after leaving the main party, and another four were unaccounted but believed to have been on Herald Island (although no one could get near it). It was not until an American expedition to the island in 1924 found human remains and equipment that confirmed the missing party had made it to land before perishing.
- The British 2nd Cavalry Division was established after merging the 5th Cavalry Brigade and 3rd Cavalry Brigade, along with members of the Royal Horse Artillery and Royal Engineers.
- The 21st Division of the British Army was established.
- Born: Leonard Feather, British jazz musician and journalist, known for his jazz music criticism for the Los Angeles Times and Metronome; in London, England (d. 1994)
- Died:
  - Robert Hope-Jones, 55, English inventor, designed the first theater organ (b. 1859)
  - Mostafa Fahmy Pasha, 74, Egyptian state leader, 7th Prime Minister of Egypt (b. 1840)

== September 14, 1914 (Monday) ==
- First Battle of the Masurian Lakes – The Russian First Army of the Neman River withdrew from East Prussia with over 100,000 casualties plus 45,000 prisoners, allowing the victorious German Eighth Army near complete control of the territory.
- The German cruiser SMS Cap Trafalgar was sunk by the British cruiser RMS Carmania at Trindade and Martin Vaz, off the coast of Brazil, with a loss of up to 50 crew and another 279 captured.
- The Royal Australian Navy's first submarine HMAS AE1 was lost off the Duke of York Islands with all 35 men while patrolling New Britain in the Pacific Ocean after less than seven months in service, the first Allied submarine loss of the war.
- The Tatiana Committee, named after Grand Duchess Tatiana Nikolaevna of Russia, was established to support war refugees.
- The Kauai High School was established in Lihue, Hawaii.
- Born:
  - Clayton Moore, American actor, played The Lone Ranger in the 1950s television series; as Jack Carlton Moore, in Chicago, United States (d. 1999)
  - Keith Hampshire, Australian air force officer, commander of the No. 6, No. 22 and No. 456 Squadrons during World War II, recipient of the Distinguished Service Order and Distinguished Flying Cross; in Port Macquarie, Australia (d. 1982)
- Died:
  - Allen Allensworth, 72, American army officer, first African-American to achieve rank of lieutenant colonel, founder of Allensworth, California (b. 1842)
  - Nicolás Zamora, 39, Filipino religious leader, founder of the Evangelical Methodist Church in the Philippine Islands (b. 1875)

== September 15, 1914 (Tuesday) ==
- The first trenches of the Western Front were dug at the First Battle of the Aisne, as the conflict ended indecisively.
- U.S. President Woodrow Wilson formally ordered all American troops to leave the Mexican port of Veracruz after nearly five months of occupation in an effort to appease relations with Mexican provisional government leader Venustiano Carranza.
- Maritz rebellion – Christian Frederick Beyers, Commandant-General of the Union Defence Force in South Africa, resigned from his commission in protest of the South African government's decision to provide military support to the British Empire during World War I. Along with General Koos de la Rey, who served in the Second Boer War and was nominated to the Senate, Beyers traveled to an armory in Potchefstroom to meet with commanding officer Major Jan Kemp. Major Kemp and some 2,000 men under his command were supposedly sympathetic to Beyer's ideas. On the way to the meeting, De la Rey's car was fired upon by a policeman after it failed to stop at a road block set up to look for a fugitive criminal gang. De la Rey was hit and killed.
- A train crash near Lebanon, Missouri, killed 27 passengers and injured 18 others.
- The 14th session of the Legislative Assembly of Manitoba began following the Conservatives led by Rodmond Roblin forming government.
- The 8th Battalion Lincolnshire Regiment of the British Army was established.
- The Wooloowin State School was established in Lutwyche, Queensland, Australia.
- Born:
  - Jens Otto Krag, Danish state leader, 18th Prime Minister of Denmark; in Randers, Denmark (d. 1978)
  - Subandrio, Indonesian politician, 10th Foreign Minister of Indonesia until removed from office following the failed 1965 coup after which he was imprisoned for 29 years; in Malang, Dutch East Indies (present-day Indonesia) (d. 2004)
  - Creighton Abrams, American army officer, commanded military operations in the Vietnam War from 1968 to 1972; in Springfield, Massachusetts, United States (d. 1974)
  - Ernest van den Haag, Dutch-American sociologist, advocate for racial segregation in the United States through the National Review; in The Hague, Netherlands (d. 2002)
  - Adolfo Bioy Casares, Argentine writer, author of the novella The Invention of Morel; in Buenos Aires, Argentina (d. 1999)
  - Robert McCloskey, American children's author/illustrator, best known for Make Way for Ducklings; as John Robert McCloskey, in Hamilton, Ohio, United States (d. 2003)
  - John Roderick, American journalist, covered Mao Zedong and rise of communist China from 1946 to 1984; in Waterville, Maine, United States (d. 2008)
- Died: Franjo Marković, 69, Croatian philosopher, promoter of aesthetics in Croatian (b. 1845)

== September 16, 1914 (Wednesday) ==
- Russian forces began the Siege of Przemyśl in Eastern Galicia where a garrison of Austrian-Hungarian forces held out for 133 days before surrendering, the longest siege in World War I.
- The Canadian Aviation Corps was formed in an attempt for Canada to provide trained pilots for the Royal Air Force during World War I, but the organization dissolved by the spring of next year.
- Born: Allen Funt, American television producer, creator and host of Candid Camera; in New York City, United States (d. 1999)

== September 17, 1914 (Thursday) ==
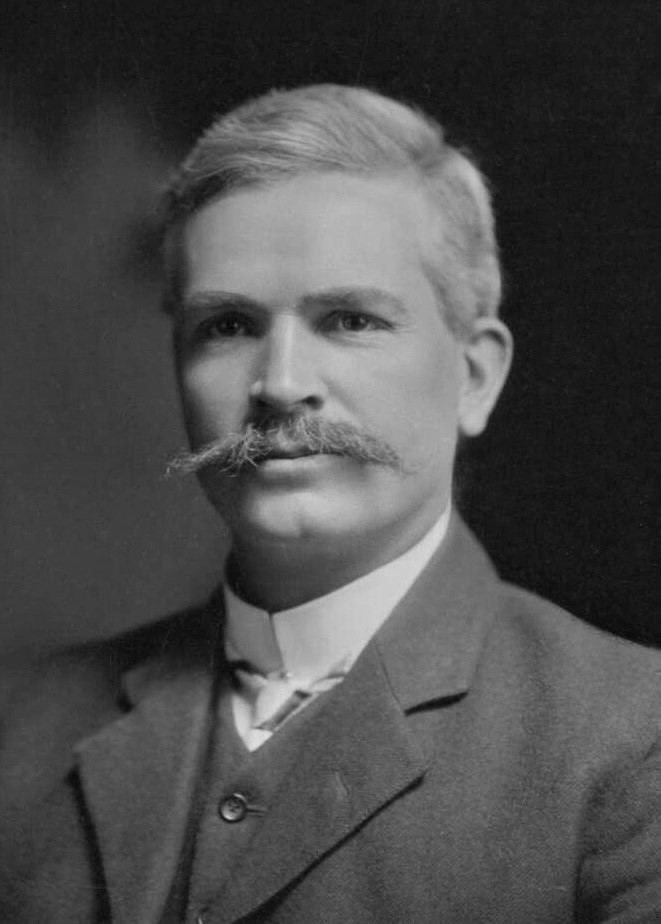
Andrew Fisher, fifth Prime Minister of Australia.

- Essad Pasha Toptani of the Ottoman Empire and Nikola Pašić of Serbia signed a secret alliance known as the Treaty of Niš.
- Andrew Fisher became Prime Minister of Australia for the third time and formed the 11th ministry of the Government of Australia, replacing the Cook Ministry.
- The German Sixth Army attempted to outflank French forces to the north in Belgium but met stiff-counter resistance, further entrenching the Western Front.
- Siege of Toma – German New Guinea governor Eduard Haber surrendered to Australian forces after determining there were few troops to defend the Pacific colony.
- The British battleship HMS Invincible sank during a storm in the English Channel off the coast of the Isle of Portland, with a loss of 21 of her 64 crew.
- The German Army command established Army Detachment A to manage strategy on the southern part of the Western Front.
- The city of Firebaugh, California was incorporated.
- Born:
  - Thomas J. Bata, Czech-Canadian business executive, CEO of Bata Shoes; as Tomáš Jan Baťa, in Prague, Kingdom of Bohemia, Austria-Hungary (present-day Czech Republic) (d. 2008)
  - William Grut, Swedish track athlete, gold medalist at the 1948 Summer Olympics; in Stockholm, Sweden (d. 2012)

== September 18, 1914 (Friday) ==
- The Government of Ireland Act received royal assent (although King George had contemplated refusing it). However, the Act is postponed for the duration of World War I by the simultaneous Suspensory Act and in practice never came into effect in its original form.
- The German Army command established Army Detachment C to manage strategy on the southern part of the Western Front.
- American steamship Francis H. Leggett sank during a storm off the coast of Oregon with the loss of 60 of her 62 passengers and crew, making it the worst maritime disaster in the state's history.
- Appliance manufacturer Kelvinator was established in Detroit.

== September 19, 1914 (Saturday) ==
- The German Ninth Army was established in Breslau near the German-Polish border to command troops on the Eastern Front.
- The German Army command established Army Detachment B to manage strategy on the extreme southern part of the Western Front.
- The 6th Cavalry Brigade, famous for its role at the Battle of Waterloo, was re-established with the 3rd Cavalry Division. The 7th and 8th Infantry Divisions were also reactivated.
- Port Adelaide 13.15 (93) defeated North Adelaide 1.8 (14) for their second successive South Australian National Football League (SAFL) flag and eighth overall. They were the only SAFL football team to finish with a perfect season, overall winning thirty consecutive matches.
- Pitcher Ed Lafitte tossed a no-hitter for the Brooklyn Tip-Tops of the Federal League in a 6–2 win over the Kansas City Packers.
- The Tryon Road Uniting Church formally opened in Lindfield, New South Wales, Australia. It was registered with the New South Wales State Heritage Register in 2003.
- Born:
  - Rogers Morton, American politician, served as cabinet minister for the Richard Nixon and Gerald Ford administrations; in Louisville, Kentucky, United States (d. 1979)
  - Alphonzo E. Bell Jr., American politician, U.S. Senator from California from 1961 to 1977; in Santa Fe Springs, California, United States (d. 2004)
- Died: Charles Devendeville, 32, French swimmer, gold medalist at the 1900 Summer Olympics; killed in action during World War I (b. 1882)

== September 20, 1914 (Sunday) ==
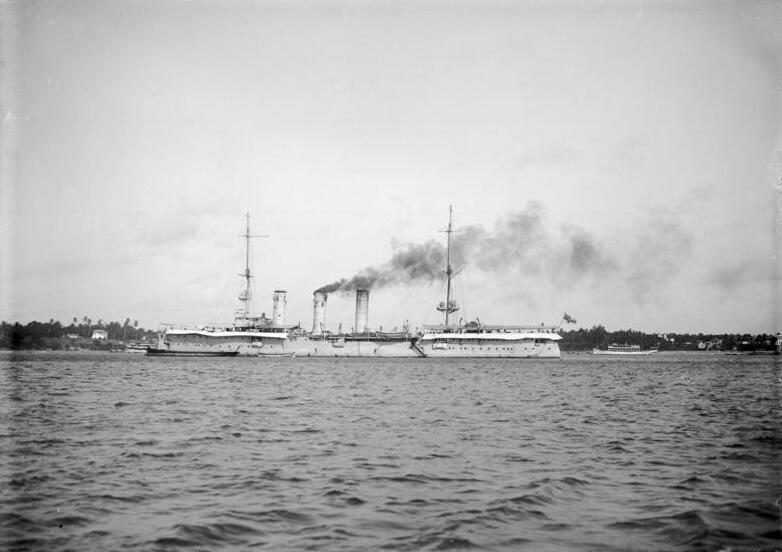
SMS Königsberg

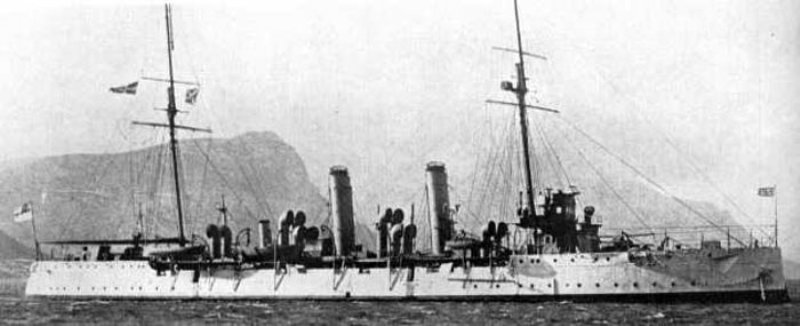
HMS Pegasus

- The German cruiser SMS Königsberg sank the British cruiser HMS Pegasus at the Battle of Zanzibar, with a loss of 38 British sailors.
- With support from Serbia and Italy, Ottoman general Essad Pasha Toptani organized an armed force of 10,000 men to invade Albania.
- In a speech at Woodenbridge, County Wicklow, John Redmond called on members of the Irish Volunteers to go "wherever the firing line extends". The majority did so, fighting in the 10th and 16th Irish Divisions alongside their volunteer counterparts from the 36th (Ulster) Division; the rump Irish Volunteers split off on 24 September.
- New train stations opened to the serve the Uetsu and Rikuu rail lines in Yamagata Prefecture, Japan, including Amarume, Karikawa and Tsuya serving the line.
- The Trinity Auditorium was dedicated as a music venue by the Methodist Episcopal Church South in Los Angeles.
- Born: Ken Hechler, American politician, U.S. Representative for West Virginia from 1959 to 1977 and Secretary of State of West Virginia from 1985 to 2001; as Kenneth Hechler, in Roslyn, New York, United States (d. 2016)
- Died: William R. Pettiford, 67, American religious leader and banker, pastor of the 16th Street Baptist Church in Birmingham, Alabama, and founder of one of the first southern banks for African-Americans (b. 1847)

== September 21, 1914 (Monday) ==
- First Battle of Picardy – German forces marched from Rheims, France, and engaged French forces the following day.
- All German armed forces in German New Guinea surrendered to the Australian Naval and Military Expeditionary Force.
- German forces laid siege to Osowiec Fortress in the Russian Empire (now north-eastern Poland), using up to 60 artillery pieces to bombard the fort.
- Battle of Ukoko – The French gunboat Surprise bombarded the German colonial port of Ukoko in the central African territory of Neukamerun (now Gabon) before French soldiers landed and took the town.
- Spanish Navy battleship Jaime I was launched and would serve in the Spanish Civil War.
- The Preston Platform railway station for the Riviera Line was closed in Devon, England, three years after it opened.
- Laurence Binyon's poem For the Fallen was published in The Times in London.
- Born: John Kluge, German-American broadcaster, owner of Metromedia from 1958 to 1986; in Chemnitz, German Empire (present-day Germany) (d. 2010)

== September 22, 1914 (Tuesday) ==
- German submarine U-9 torpedoed three British Royal Navy armored cruisers, HMS Aboukir, Cressy and Hogue, with the deaths of more than 1,400 men, in the North Sea.
- The German light cruiser SMS Emden bombarded Madras, the only Indian city to be attacked by the Central Powers in World War I.
- In the first British air raid against Germany in history, Royal Naval Air Service BE.2 aircraft of No. 3 Squadron based at Antwerp, Belgium, attacked German airship hangars at Cologne and Düsseldorf, Germany, but failed to inflict damage due to bad weather and the failure of bombs to explode.
- Bombardment of Papeete – German armored cruisers SMS Scharnhorst and Gneisenau entered the port of Papeete on the island of Tahiti and sank the French gunboat Zélée and freighter Walkure before bombarding the town's fortifications.
- French novelist Alain-Fournier (Lieutenant Henri-Alban Fournier), aged 27, was killed in action near Vaux-lès-Palameix (Meuse) a month after enlisting, leaving his second novel, Colombe Blanchet, unfinished. His body wasn't identified until 1991.
- The Nagoya Electric Railway opened new stations in Kiyosu, Japan, including Marunouchi.
- T. S. Eliot met fellow American poet Ezra Pound for the first time at Pound's flat in London, starting a professional relationship that encouraged Eliot to focus on a serious career in poetry.
- The association football club Martín Ledesma was established in Capiatá, Paraguay.
- Born:
  - Dorothy Ray Healey, American activist, leading promoter of minority workers' rights through the Communist Party USA and New American Movement; as Dorothy Harriet Rosenblum, in Denver, United States (d. 2006)
  - M. J. Thirumalachar, Indian microbiologist, known for the development of antifungal antibiotics, recipient of the Shanti Swarup Bhatnagar Prize for Science and Technology; as Mandayam Jeersannidhi Thirumalachar, in Mysore, British India (present-day India) (d. 1999)

== September 23, 1914 (Wednesday) ==
- Lieutenant O.F.J. Hogg of British Army commanded the first anti-aircraft unit to shoot down an aircraft, firing 75 rounds from a QF 1 pdr Mark II ("pom-pom") artillery piece.
- South Australian Railways opened the Waikerie railway line between Karoonda and Waikerie, South Australia, Australia.
- Women sorority Delta Sigma Epsilon was established at Miami University in Oxford, Ohio. It merged with Delta Zeta in 1956.
- Born:
  - Omar Ali Saifuddien III, Brunei noble, 28th Sultan of Brunei; Omar Ali Saifuddien Sa'adul Khairi Waddien, in Brunei Town, Brunei (d. 1986)
  - Bodo Sandberg, Dutch air force officer, member of the Royal Netherlands Air Force during World War II, recipient of the Cross of Merit and Airman's Cross; in Rotterdam, Netherlands (d. 2005)

== September 24, 1914 (Thursday) ==
- German naval officer Wilhelm Souchon was commissioned into the Ottoman Navy with the rank of Vice Admiral.
- The French Air Force squadron Escadrille 31 was established at the Dijon Air Base near Longvic, France.
- Born:
  - Andrzej Panufnik, Polish-British musician and composer, reestablished the Warsaw National Philharmonic Orchestra after World War II before defecting to Great Britain; in Warsaw, Congress Poland (present-day Poland) (d. 1991)
  - John Kerr, Australian politician, 18th Governor-General of Australia; in Sydney, Australia (d. 1991)

== September 25, 1914 (Friday) ==
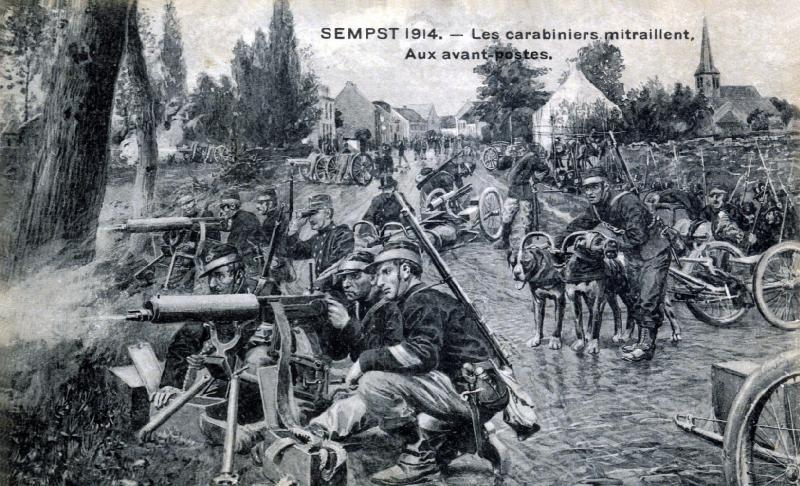
Belgian troops in action near Antwerp.

- Battle of Buggenhout – The Belgians launched a major offensive against German forces at Buggenhout between Antwerp and Brussels.
- The French Second Army fought the German Sixth Army in the First Battle of Albert.
- The first attempt by the New Zealand Expeditionary Force to depart New Zealand for Europe was aborted due to concerns about the presence of German SMS Emden capturing or sinking merchant vessels in the Indian Ocean.
- Kamerun campaign – French colonial forces captured the German fort at Kousséri, German Cameroon, forcing the Germans to retreat to Mora.
- Born: Elena Lucena, Argentine film actress, popular movie star during the Golden Age of Argentine Cinema; as María Elena Lucena, in Buenos Aires, Argentina (d. 2015)
- Died: James Whitney, 70, Canadian politician, 6th Premier of Ontario (b. 1843)

== September 26, 1914 (Saturday) ==
- The German South West Africa army defeated forces from the Union of South Africa at the Battle of Sandfontein in what is now Namibia.
- Battle of Buggenhout – Belgian troops and cavalry engaged and attempted to cut off the retreat of the German Landwehr Brigade, but the brigade managed to escape encirclement and rejoin the main body of forces the following day.
- The United States Federal Trade Commission was established by the Federal Trade Commission Act.
- Carlton won the 18th Victorian Football League Premiership, defeating South Melbourne 6.9 (45) to 4.15 (39) in the VFL Grand Final.
- Born:
  - Jack LaLanne, American fitness, exercise and nutritional expert, producer and host of The Jack LaLanne Show from 1951 to 1985; as Francois Henri LaLanne, in San Francisco, United States (d. 2011)
  - Achille Compagnoni, Italian mountaineer, first climber to scale and reach the summit of K2 with Lino Lacedelli; in Santa Caterina di Valfurva, Kingdom of Italy (present-day Italy) (d. 2009)
  - Dorian Shainin, American engineer, noted quality and reliability expert for NASA, United States Department of Defense, Hewlett-Packard, Ford Motor Company, Exxon, AT&T and others; in San Francisco, United States (d. 2000)
  - Richard Earl Thompson, American artist, member of the American Impressionism movement; in Oak Park, Illinois, United States (d. 1991)
- Died: August Macke, 27, German painter, one of the leading members of the German Expressionist group Der Blaue Reiter (The Blue Rider); killed in action during World War I (b. 1887)

== September 27, 1914 (Sunday) ==
- Battle of Albert – German forces pushed back French reserve armies around the River Somme east of Albert, France.
- Battle of Buggenhout – A Belgian volunteer regiment clashed with German troops, but, outmanned and outgunned, retreated to Mol, Belgium, where some volunteer recruits managed to frustrate German troops from taking its railway station (the rail was blown up later to slow the German advance)
- Russian forces regrouped and forced back German artillery away from Osowiec Fortress in Russian-held Polish territory, ending Germany's first attempt to take the fort.
- A Cossack unit attacked Jewish residents in Lwów, causing 40 civilian casualties.
- Komagata Maru incident – Passengers of the Japanese ship Komagata Maru arrived back in Calcutta after being forced to return from Canada. British authorities attempted to arrest Baba Gurdit Singh and 20 other men deemed as leaders for organizing the voyage. Singh resisted arrest, causing a general riot to break out. British officers opened fire and killed 19 passengers. Most of the survivors were arrested, but Singh escaped along with a few others and remained underground until 1920.
- The first Neutral Socialist Conference was held in Lugano, Switzerland, by representatives of the Swiss Social Democratic Party and the Italian Socialist Party. Two more conferences for socialist parties in Europe would be held during World War I.
- Nap Lajoie of the Cleveland Naps becomes the third pro baseball player to 3000 hits, nearly four months after Honus Wagner of the Pittsburgh Pirates.

== September 28, 1914 (Monday) ==
- The Germans began bombarding the fortresses protecting Antwerp.
- Battle of Albert – French forces halted the German advance around Arras in the Somme valley.
- Siege of Tsingtao – German naval ships SMS Cormoran, SMS Iltis, SMS Luchs, and SMS Tiger were scuttled off the coast of Tsingtau, China to prevent capture by the British.
- The Oz Film Manufacturing Company, founded by L. Frank Baum, author of the bestselling fantasy novels set in the Land of Oz, released the first film adaptations of his books – The Patchwork Girl of Oz and The Magic Cloak of Oz. Unfortunately, neither movie was a success and subsequent films failed to translate Baum's success with the books into movies. The film company would fold within a year.
- The Bevier and Southern Railroad (BVS) was established when the rail company Missouri and Louisiana Railroad divided the Missouri portion to become BVS until it was shut down in 1982.
- The State School of Mines and Metallurgy officially opened in El Paso, Texas. It evolved to become the University of Texas at El Paso in 1967.
- Born: Maria Franziska von Trapp, Austrian singer, second oldest of the Trapp Family Singers; in Zell am See, Austria-Hungary (present-day Austria) (d. 2014)
- Died:
  - Richard Warren Sears, 50, American business leader, founder of Sears, Roebuck and Company (b. 1863)
  - Christian Fleetwood, 74, American soldier, noted African-American to receive the Medal of Honor for actions at the Battle of Chaffin's Farm during the American Civil War (b. 1840)
  - Stevan Mokranjac, 58, Serbian composer, credited as the "father of Serbian music" for compositions and musical education in Belgrade (b. 1856)

== September 29, 1914 (Tuesday) ==
- Battle of the Vistula River – The German Ninth Army advanced on Vistula River where Russian forces regrouped following their defeat at the First Battle of the Masurian Lakes.
- Siege of Antwerp – German bombardments rendered several forts useless to defense, forcing the Belgian army to evacuate all wounded, non-combative men, prisoners of war, equipment and ammunition to Antwerp. Belgian Prime Minister Charles de Broqueville informed the British the Belgian field army of 65,000 men would withdraw to Ostend if the outer fortresses fell and leave a garrison of 80,000 troops to hold Antwerp for as long as possible.
- Battle of Albert – A German reserve division attacked and captured the French village of Fricourt but was prevented by a French barrage from advancing further. France counter-attacked the following day and almost recaptured Fricourt.
- The German cruiser SMS Emden moored at the Maldives in the Indian Ocean to restock its coal supplies using a captured merchant vessel.
- Arthur Machen's short story The Bowmen, origin of the legend of the Angels of Mons, is published in The Evening News (London).
- Born: Edward Cobb Outlaw, American naval officer, commander of the Fighting Squadron 32 of the USS Langley during World War II, six-time recipient of the Air Medal, two-time recipient of the Distinguished Flying Cross, and Navy Cross; in Greenville, North Carolina, United States (d. 1996)
- Died: Jean Bouin, 25, French runner, silver medalist at the 1912 Summer Olympics; killed in action near Marseille during World War I (b. 1888)

== September 30, 1914 (Wednesday) ==
- French forces arrived at Arras in an attempt to outflank the advancing German armies in what was the start of the Battle of Arras.
- British Indian Army Expeditionary Force A arrived at Marseille for service in the Ypres Salient of the Western Front (World War I).
- Japanese seaplane carrier Wakamiya was damaged by a naval mine and forced to retire from the Siege of Tsingtao, ending the first combat deployment of an aviation ship in history.
- The Australian Army Intelligence Corps was disbanded and replaced with intelligence sections for each Australian military district.
- The two Curtiss Model H prototypes, originally prepared for the Daily Mail sponsored transatlantic contest in August, were shipped to Great Britain aboard RMS Mauretania for the Royal Naval Air Service. This spawned a fleet of aircraft which saw extensive military service during World War I, where they were developed extensively for anti-submarine patrol and air-sea rescue.
- Frank Hanly, Governor of Indiana, established the Flying Squadron of America to promote the temperance movement.
- Born: Tom Eckersley, British graphic artist, known for design works for various organizations including Austin Reed, British Petroleum, and Guinness; in Lancashire, England (d. 1997)
