= Johnson & Wales University =

Private university in Providence, Rhode Island, US

- Former names: Johnson & Wales Business School (1914–1988)
- Motto: The Wildcat Way; Pride, Courage, Character and Community
- Type: Private university
- Established: 1914; 112 years ago
- Endowment: $263.78 million (2015)
- Chancellor: Mim L. Runey
- Students: 8,274 (fall 2024)
- Undergraduates: 7,254 (fall 2024)
- Postgraduates: 1,020 (fall 2024)
- Location: Providence, Rhode Island; Charlotte, North Carolina
- Campus: Urban, 176 acres (0.71 km^{2})
- Colors: Blue, white, and gold
- Nickname: Wildcats
- Sporting affiliations: NCAA Division III – CNE (Providence); NCAA Division III – C2C (Charlotte); NEISA
- Mascot: Wildcat Willie
- Website: jwu.edu

Johnson & Wales University (JWU) is a private university with its main campus in Providence, Rhode Island, United States. Founded as a business school in 1914 by Gertrude I. Johnson and Mary T. Wales, JWU enrolled 7,357 students across its campuses in the fall of 2020. The university is accredited by the New England Commission of Higher Education.

== History ==
=== 1914–1947 ===
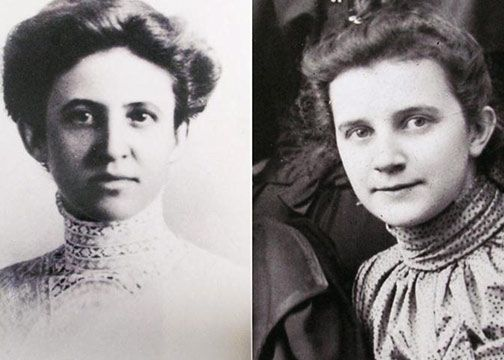
Gertrude I. Johnson and Mary T. Wales

Johnson & Wales Business School was founded in September 1914 in Providence, Rhode Island. Founders Gertrude I. Johnson and Mary T. Wales met as students at Pennsylvania State Normal School in Millersville, Pennsylvania. Years later, both were teaching at Bryant and Stratton business school in Providence (now Bryant University) when they decided to team up and open a business school. The school opened with one student and one typewriter on Hope Street in Providence. The school soon moved to a larger site on Olney Street, and later moved downtown to 36 Exchange Street to better serve returning soldiers after World War I. The curriculum in the early part of the 20th century included bookkeeping, typing, shorthand, English, and mathematics. The school admitted both men and women.

=== 1947–1963 ===
In June 1947, founders Johnson and Wales, facing old age and illness, sold Johnson & Wales Business School to partners (and Navy buddies) Edward Triangelo and Morris Gaebe. At this time the school had roughly 100 students.

Triangelo and Gaebe served as co-directors as the school grew rapidly. The school earned national accreditation in 1954. In 1960, Johnson & Wales was accredited as a junior college.

=== 1963–present ===
The school became a registered nonprofit organization in 1963. Edward P. Triangolo served as the college's first president from 1963 to 1969.

During the 1960s and 1970s, as Providence hotels and department stores fled to the suburbs, Johnson and Wales took the opportunity to expand its downtown presence. The university purchased the former Crown Hotel in 1966, and both the former Dreyfus Hotel and the Gladdings Department Store building in 1975.

Morris Gaebe served as president from 1969 to 1989, and later chancellor. Gaebe introduced the hospitality program in 1972, despite skepticism from the college's board. Enrollment in the program grew from 141 students in 1973 to 3,000 in 1983. Eventually the school's culinary programs became widely renowned. The college officially became Johnson & Wales University in 1988, known informally as JWU.

By 2016, the university had 16,000 students and more than 2,400 employees across campuses in four cities. Degree programs were offered in business, culinary arts, arts and sciences, nutrition, education, hospitality, physician assistant studies, engineering, and design.

The university shut down its Denver and North Miami campuses at the end of the 2020–21 school year.

== Campuses ==
=== Providence ===
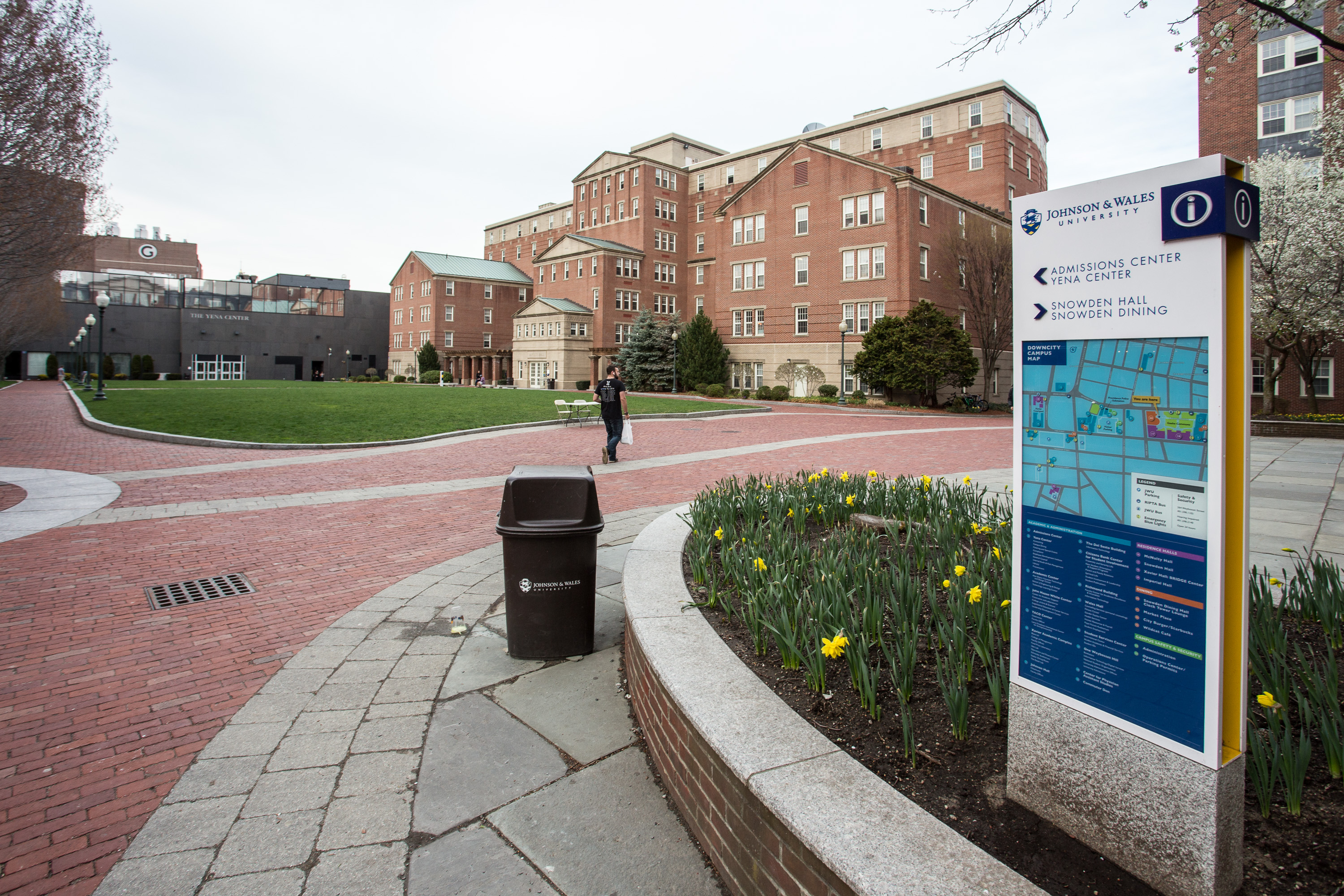
Downcity Providence campus

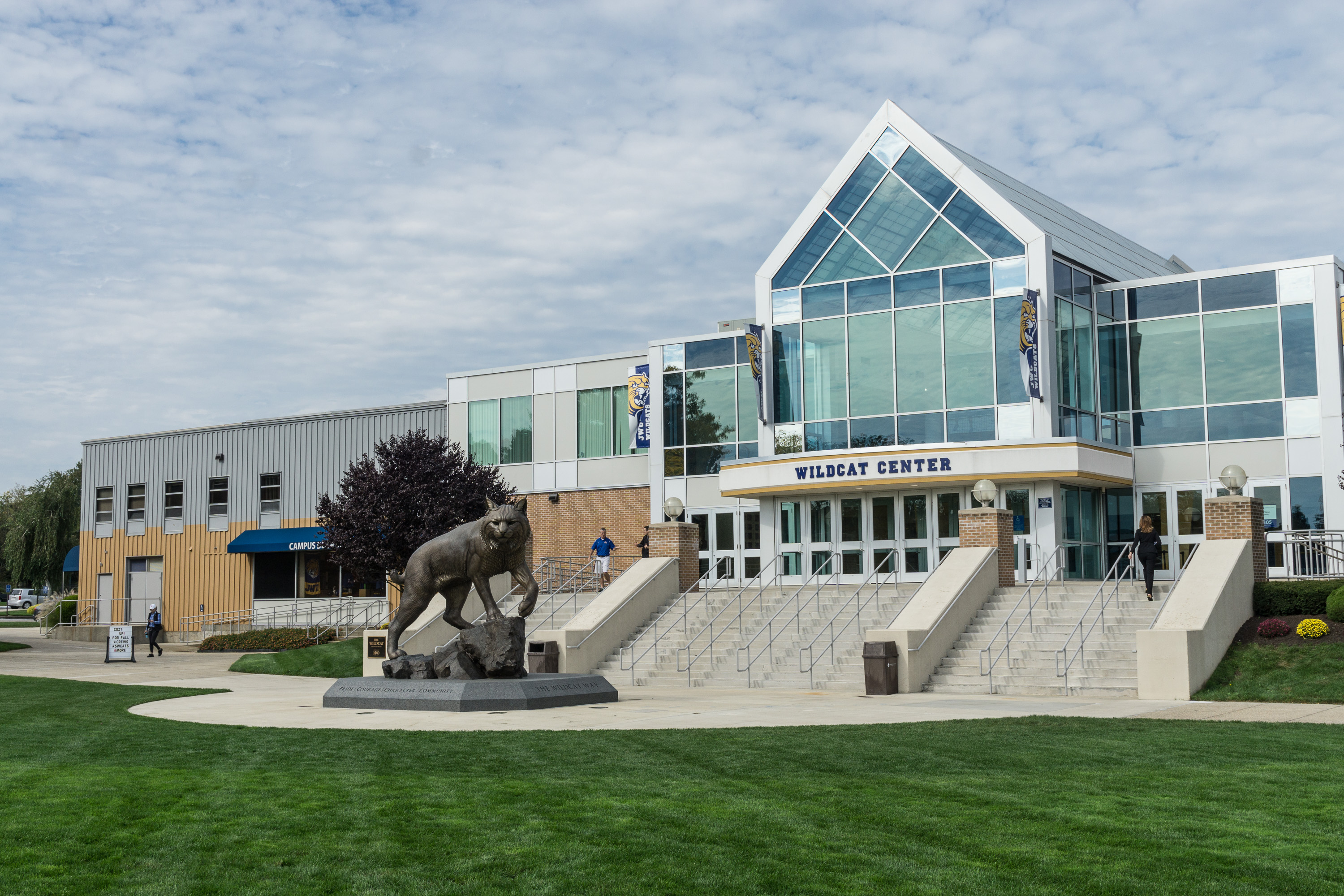
Wildcat Center at the Harborside campus in Providence

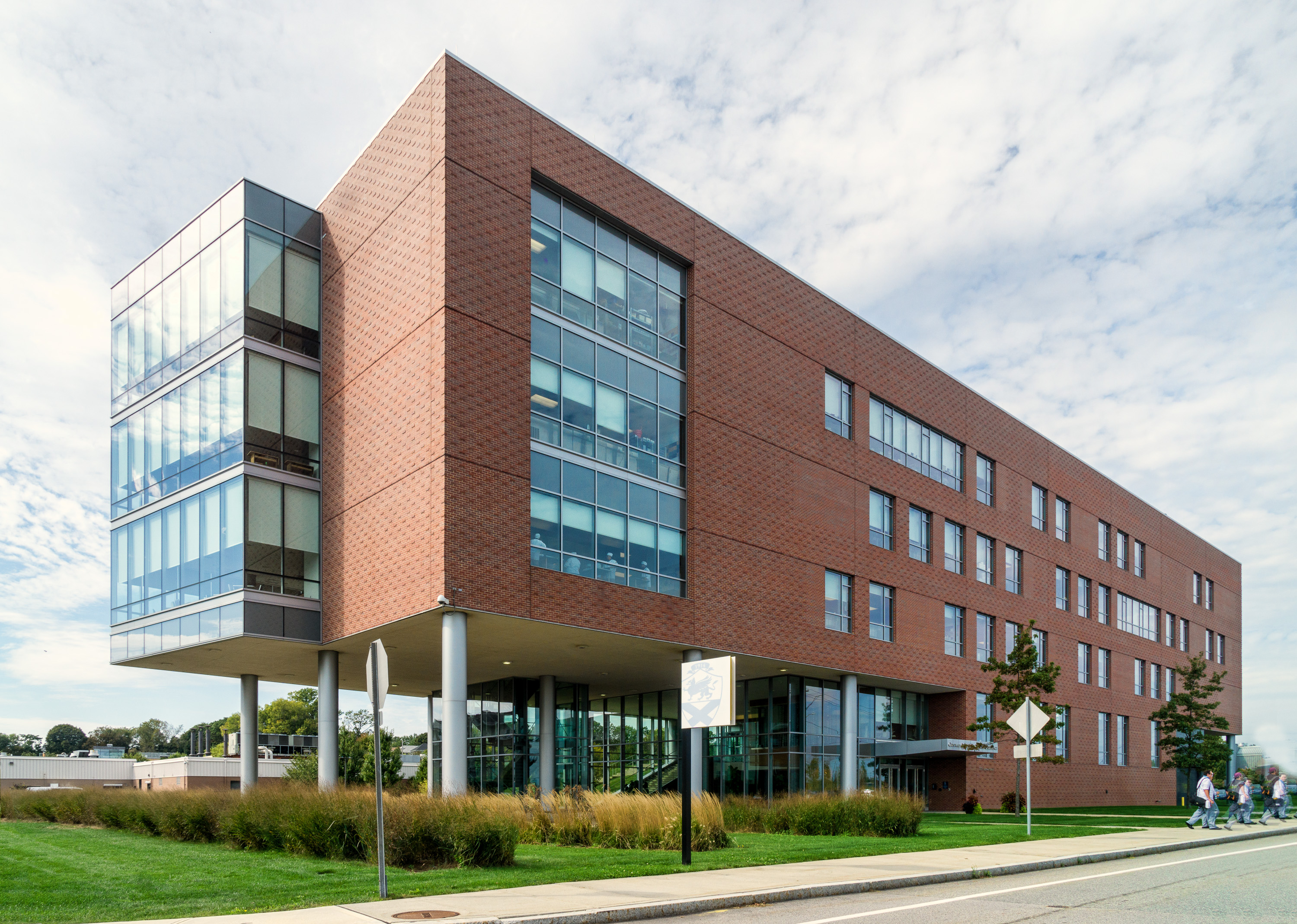
The Cuisinart Center for Culinary Excellence, Harborside campus in Providence

The Providence campus houses JWU's business, hospitality, and technology programs (called Downcity and opened in 1914), with a subsidiary campus housing JWU's culinary and graduate programs (called Harborside and opened in 1985) in Cranston, Rhode Island. Combined, the Providence campus covers 176 acres, including ten residence halls (Harborside, West, East, South, Harbor View, Centennial, McNulty, Snowden, Xavier, and Imperial Hall), five dining locations, and the Wildcat Center (housing athletics, a bookstore, and a fitness center).

=== Charlotte ===
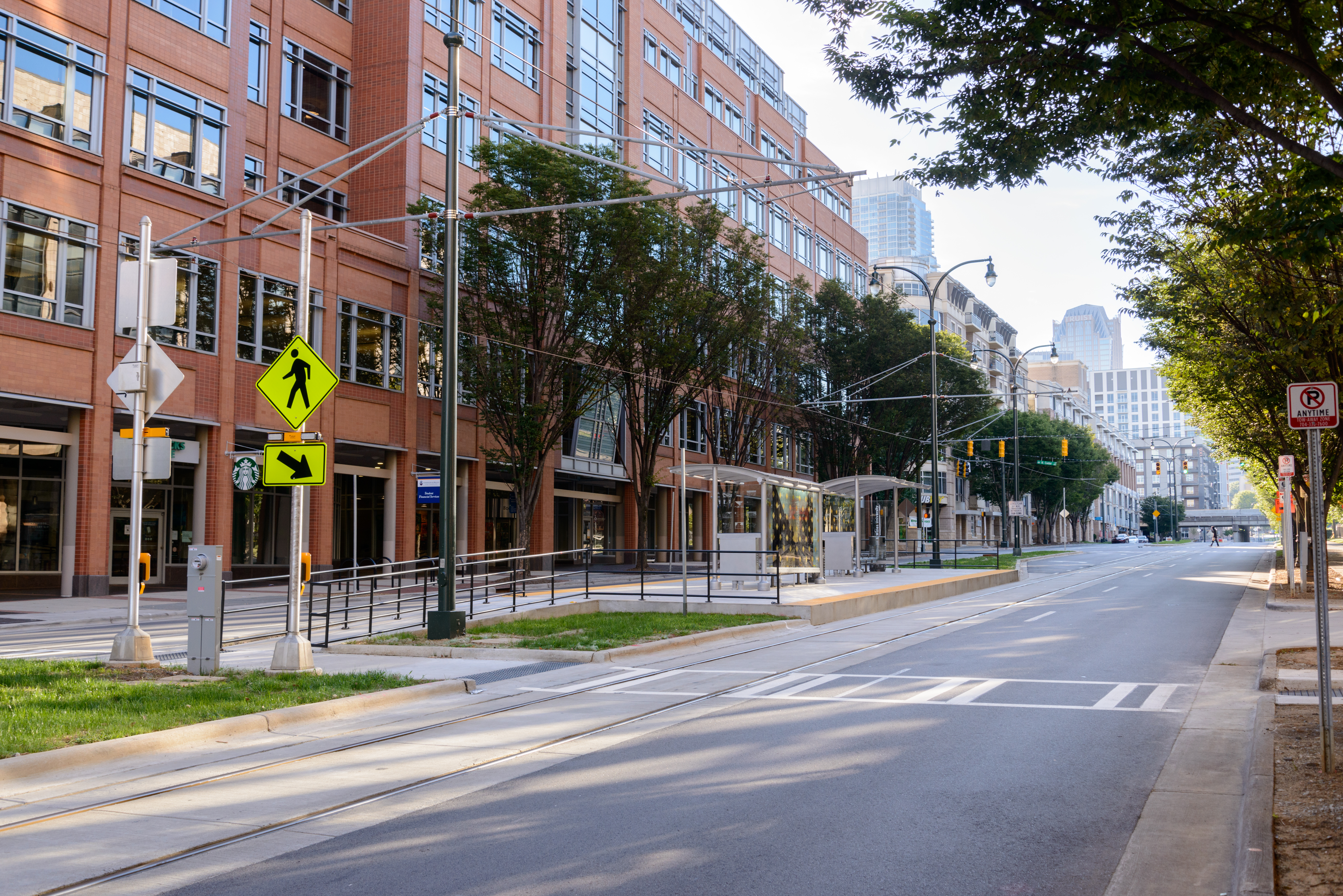
The Village Bookstore, Starbucks, and Student Financial Services within the Gateway Center in Charlotte

The Charlotte campus was announced in 2002 to consolidate the Charleston and Norfolk locations. The urban campus is located on around 15 acres within and surrounding the Gateway Village area in Uptown Charlotte, and opened in 2004. There are three residence halls (Cedar North, Cedar South, and The Maple), two dining locations (including The Caf Dining Hall and a Starbucks), and the Wildcat Center (housing athletics, a fitness center, a group fitness room, gymnasium, locker rooms, and the Wildcat Den). In 2024, Johnson & Wales announced an expansion of the Charlotte campus, beginning with closing and selling the 566-bed City View Towers residence hall built in 2005 and converting the existing DoubleTree by Hilton hotel located on its campus into The Maple residence hall.

=== Former locations ===
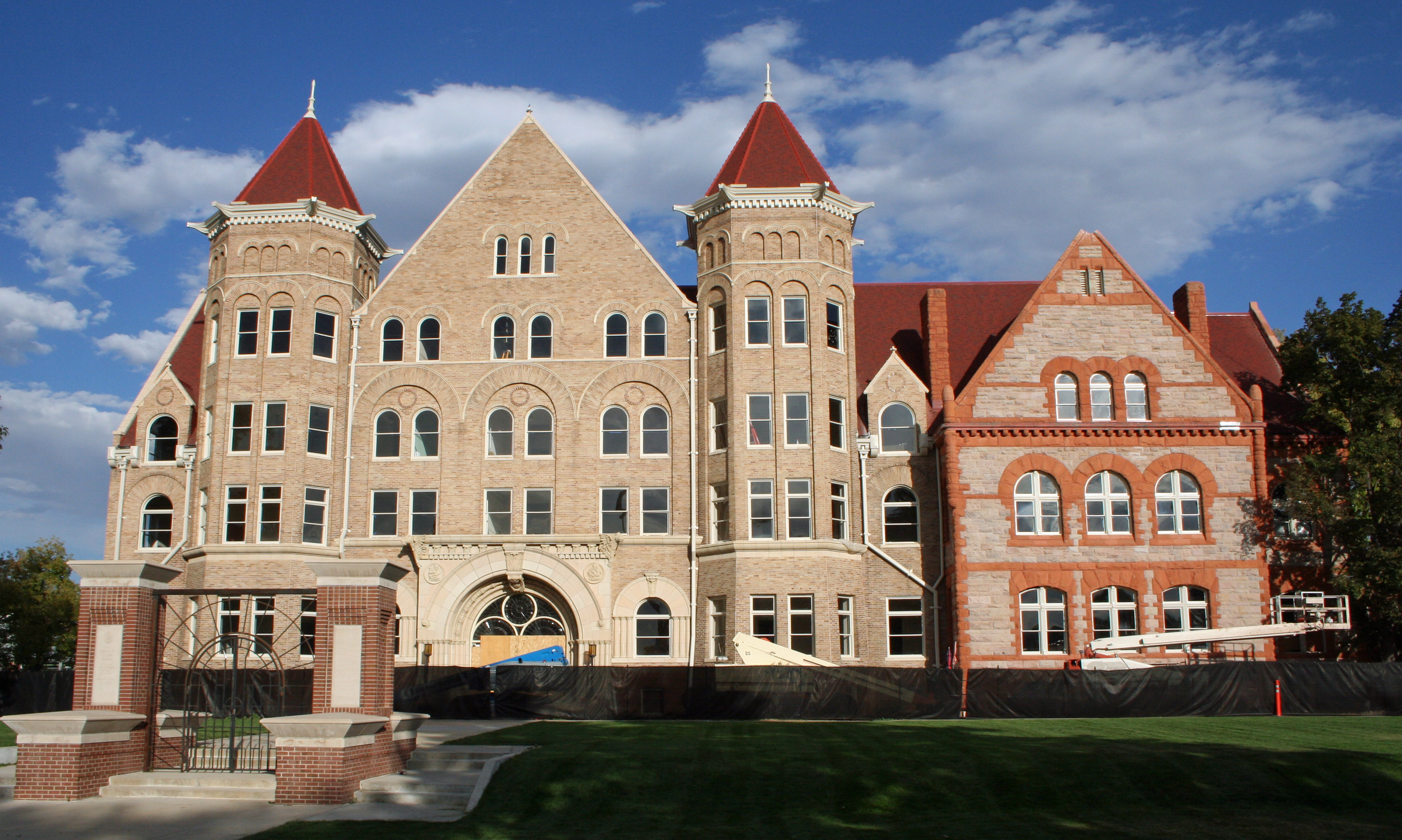
Centennial Hall on the (former) Denver campus

- North Miami, Florida (1992–2021)
- Denver, Colorado (2000–2021)
- Charleston, South Carolina (1984–2006)
- Norfolk, Virginia (1986–2006)

== Academics ==
JWU has four academic colleges:

- John Hazen White College of Arts & Sciences
- College of Hospitality & Business
- College of Food Innovation & Technology
- College of Health & Wellness

Johnson & Wales University is well known for its culinary arts program, but was first founded as business and hospitality programs. The university is the largest food service educator in the world. JWU is one of the top three hospitality colleges, according to the 2010 rankings released by the American Universities Admissions Program, which ranks American universities according to their international reputation. JWU is home to the 39th largest college of business in the United States.

== Greek life ==
=== Providence campuses ===
The Providence Downcity and Harborside campuses currently offer membership in 15 fraternities and sororities as well as two social fellowships.

== Athletics ==
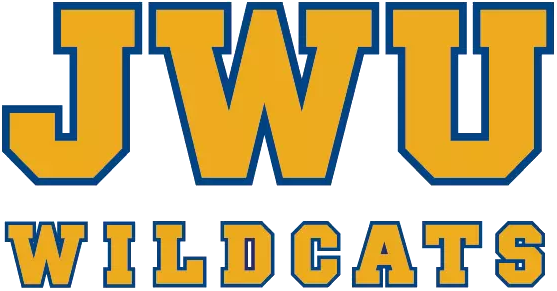
JWU athletics wordmark

The teams of all campuses of Johnson & Wales University are called the Wildcats.

Willie T. Wildcat (better known as Wildcat Willie) is the official costumed mascot. The suit was redesigned and revealed at the annual family weekend on October 16, 2013, as an early start to the school's centennial year (2014). Previously the costumes had been very different across the four campuses, but the new design replaced all former costumes. The new design came from Devon Tsinzo (Providence Class of 2015), who won the redesign contest. The new mascot was made by BAM! Mascots. Willie appears at home games, alumni events, and other special events. He is played by multiple students, meaning that JWU can accept requests for him to appear at many events. Although the various campuses compete either in the NAIA, USCAA, or NCAA Division III, Willie follows the rules of a Division I mascot, including never breaking character.

During the 1980s and 1990s the official mascot at the JWU Providence campus was Griff the Griffin, a creature with the head of an eagle, body of a lion, and tail of a dragon.

=== Providence campuses ===
The athletic teams of the Providence campuses (Downcity and Harborside) are members of the Division III level of the National Collegiate Athletic Association (NCAA), primarily competing in the Great Northeast Athletic Conference (GNAC) since the 1995–96 academic year; except the men's ice hockey team, which competes in the New England Hockey Conference (NEHC).

JWU–Providence competes in 15 intercollegiate varsity sports: Men's sports include baseball, basketball, ice hockey, lacrosse, soccer and wrestling; while women's sports include basketball, field hockey, ice hockey, lacrosse, rowing, soccer, softball and volleyball; and co-ed sports include equestrian.

=== North Miami campus ===
The athletic teams of the North Miami campus were members of the National Association of Intercollegiate Athletics (NAIA), primarily competing in the Sun Conference from 2009–10 to 2019–20. The Wildcats previously competed as an NAIA Independent within the Association of Independent Institutions (AII) from about 2005–06 to 2008–09.

JWU–North Miami competed in 11 intercollegiate varsity sports: Men's sports included basketball, cross country, golf, soccer and track & field, while women's sports included basketball, cross country, golf, soccer, track & field and volleyball.

As part of the North Miami campus's closure in 2021, on July 28, 2020, JWU published a memorandum that detailed the discontinuation of all sports seasons and competitions there.

=== Charlotte campus ===
The athletic teams of the Charlotte campus were members of the United States Collegiate Athletic Association (USCAA), primarily competing in the Eastern Metro Athletic Conference (EMAC) from the 2018–19 academic year until 2025.

JWU–Charlotte competes in 14 intercollegiate varsity sports. Men's sports include baseball, basketball, cross-country, golf, soccer and tennis, while women's sports include basketball, cross-country, golf, soccer, softball, tennis, track & field (indoor and outdoor) and volleyball.

The JWU–Charlotte Lady Wildcats basketball team won the 2018 USCAA Division II National Championship.

JWU–Charlotte joined the Coast to Coast Athletic Conference (C2C) in 2025, as a first-year transitional member of NCAA Division III. JWU–Charlotte will become a full, active Division III member in the 2028–29 academic year, if the transition is completed successfully. All JWU–Charlotte teams compete in the C2C, except women's golf, which is a member of the Colonial Women's Golf Conference, and men's golf, which competes as an independent.

=== Denver campus ===
The athletic teams of the Denver campus were members of the Division III level of the National Collegiate Athletic Association (NCAA), primarily competing in the Southern Collegiate Athletic Conference (SCAC) from 2018–19 to 2019–20. The Wildcats previously competed as an NAIA Independent within the Association of Independent Institutions (AII) of the National Association of Intercollegiate Athletics (NAIA) from about 2005–06 to 2017–18; while its women's lacrosse team competed as an affiliate member of the Kansas Collegiate Athletic Conference (KCAC).

JWU–Denver competed in 15 intercollegiate varsity sports: Men's sports included basketball, cross country, , soccer and track & field (indoor and outdoor); while women's sports included basketball, cross country, lacrosse, soccer, track & field (indoor and outdoor) and volleyball.

==== Move to NCAA Division III ====
JWU Denver announced on February 21, 2017, that it would transition from the NAIA to NCAA Division III, a multi-year journey commencing with an "exploratory year" in fall 2017. The school planned to compete as a member of the SCAC, beginning with the 2018–19 season, where it was paired up as a travel partner with the SCAC's Colorado College.

As part of the Denver campus's closure at the end of the 2020–21 school year, JWU announced on June 26, 2020, that all athletic programs there were terminated and that student-athletes were granted releases to talk with other schools.

== Notable alumni ==
- Michelle Bernstein (1994), chef and restaurateur
- Sara Bradley, chef
- Jeanine Calkin, member of the Rhode Island Senate
- Stephanie Cmar (2007), chef and Top Chef contestant
- Graham Elliot Bowles (2007), celebrity chef
- Tyler Florence (1994)
- Lorena Garcia (2000) Chef, restaurateur, author
- Thomas J. Gibson, chancellor of the University of Wisconsin–Milwaukee and the University of Wisconsin–Stevens Point
- Andrew Gruel, Chef, restaurateur and television personality
- Rahman "Rock" Harper (1996), Hell's Kitchen season 3 winner
- Chris Hastings (1984), chef and restaurateur
- Andy Husbands (1992), chef, restaurateur, author and television personality
- Maria Kanellis (2017), pro wrestler and valet
- Emeril Lagasse (1978), celebrity chef and television personality
- Scott Leibfried (1993), chef and culinary consultant, Hell's Kitchen sous chef, blue team (seasons 1–10)
- Thomas Michael McGovern (2001, Ed.D.), college president
- J. A. Moore, member of the South Carolina House of Representatives
- Anna Olson (1995), celebrity chef and television personality, Food Network Canada
- Jim Renner (2007), pro golfer
- Charles Rosa (2008), professional Mixed Martial Artist
- Aaron Sanchez, celebrity chef
- Chris Santos (1993), celebrity chef and television personality
- Ben Silverman, professional golfer
- Adrianne Calvo (2004), chef and television personality
- Chris Cosentino (1994), chef and television personality
- David Kinch (1981), American chef and restaurateur
- Beau MacMillan (1991), American chef and television personality
- Charlie Ayers (1990), American chef, cookbook author, and restaurateur
- Blac Chyna (dropped out in 2008), model and socialite
