= Mary T. Wales =

American teacher (1874–1952)

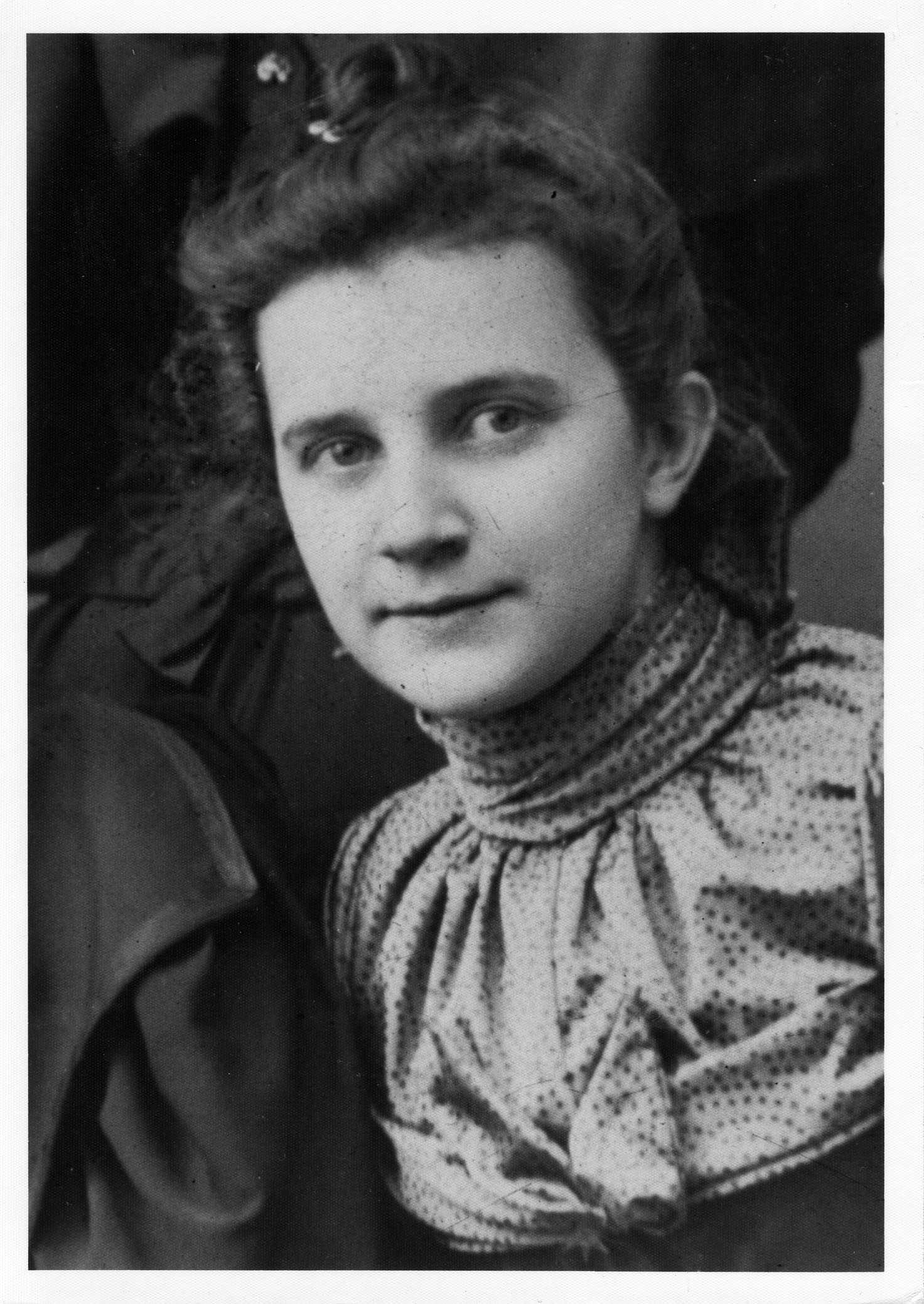
Wales, c. 1914

Mary Tiffany Wales (1874–1952) was a college-educated teacher and co-founder of Johnson & Wales Business School in Providence, Rhode Island.

== Early life ==
Mary Tiffany Wales was born in 1874 in Wilmington, Delaware. She attended Pennsylvania State Normal School (now Millersville University of Pennsylvania) in Millersville, Pennsylvania, graduating 1893. She spent five years teaching in Pennsylvania, then moved to Massachusetts where she taught for twelve years. In 1911 Mary moved to Providence to teach at the Rhode Island Commercial School (now Bryant University).

== School founder ==
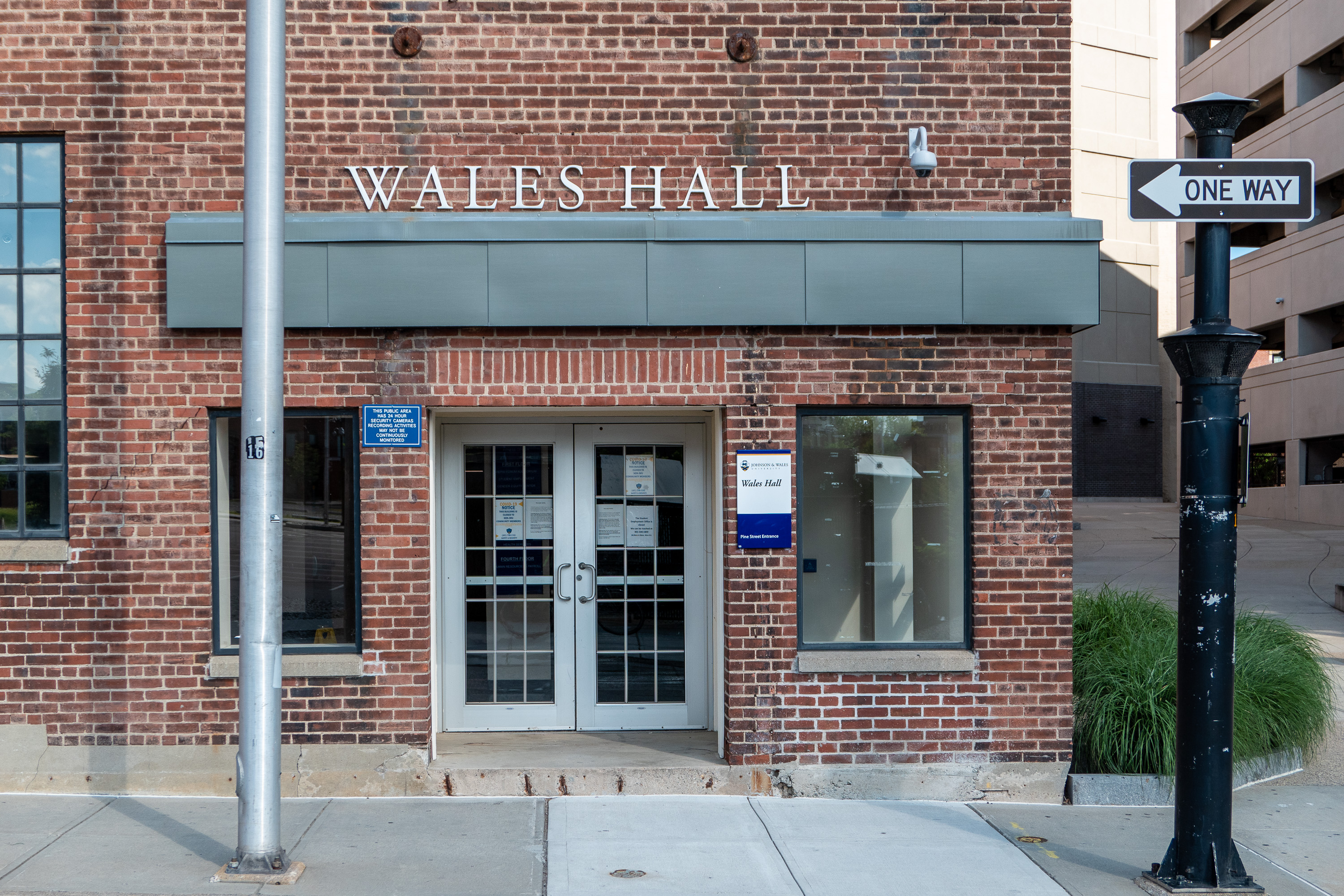
Wales Hall at Johnson & Wales University

In 1914, with fellow teacher Gertrude I. Johnson, she co-founded Johnson & Wales Business School in Providence, Rhode Island. It has grown into the present-day Johnson & Wales University, with four campuses in the Eastern U.S.

== Later life ==
With Mary in poor health, the two women sold the business school in June 1947 and retired together in Warwick, Rhode Island. Mary died of cancer in 1952.
