= Battle of Buggenhout =

World War I battle in East Flanders, Belgium

- Part of the Siege of Antwerp during the German invasion of Belgium in the First World War
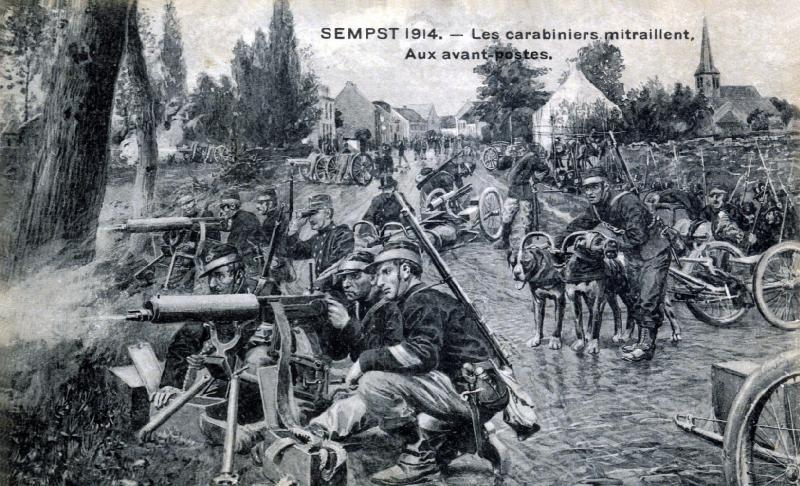
- Belgian troops in action near Antwerp in the summer of 1914
Date	25–29 September 1914
Location	Buggenhout, East Flanders, Belgium 51°00′N 04°12′E

Belligerents
Belgium	German Empire

Commanders and leaders
(Belgium) King Albert I (Belgium) Émile Dossin (Belgium) Édouard Michel (Belgium) Alphonse Jacques	(German Empire) Albrecht of Württemberg

The Battle of Buggenhout (25–29 September 1914) was fought at the beginning of the First World War in Belgium at Buggenhout, a municipality between Antwerp, Ghent and Brussels. The Belgian army sortied from Antwerp against German troops to the south. The Belgians planned to exploit German troop movements away from Antwerp and to assist the French army on the Marne. King Albert I the Belgian Commander in Chief, saw that the Germans had strengthened most of their positions south of Antwerp and reduced the attack to an operation against Landwehr Brigade 37, which had advanced from Brussels towards Dendermonde.

The attack was made by the 4th and 5th divisions of the field army. The 4th Division advanced from Grembergen and Hamme, as the 2nd and 5th regiments Chasseurs à pied of the 5th Division attacked on the left flank from Bornem and Puurs. The Cavalry Division attacked Aalst from the west but the Belgian sortie was suspended after German artillery began a bombardment of the forts of the National redoubt of Belgium (French: Réduit national, Dutch: Nationaal Reduit) around Antwerp, preparatory to its own attack.

== Background ==
The railway network in Belgium had many facilities for the movement of supplies and troops and after the sortie of 9–13 September, the Belgian High Command planned to destroy the communications at several points. Seven volunteer detachments of a hundred cyclists each were formed and sent through the German lines to conduct railway demolitions. The cyclist detachments left Antwerp on 22 September, slipped through the lines and cut the principal lines in Limburg, Brabant and Hainault. Most detachments were able to return to Antwerp but some were discovered, surrounded, killed or taken prisoner and the Germans inflicted reprisals on civilians living nearby.

Ten motorcyclists unpinned the rails between Bilzen and Tongeren; two hours later, a German troop train was derailed. Germans troops entered Bilzen, shot eight civilians and set fire to part of the village. Another cycle column was surprised by the Germans in the act of blowing up the line at Tubize; a few Belgians escaped and took refuge in a neighbouring village. Shortly afterwards the bodies of two civilians were found near the scene of the skirmish and several houses were seen to have been burnt down.

A German proclamation was issued on 25 September by the Governor-General,

Convoys of trucks and patrols have recently been surprised and attacked by the inhabitants in certain districts not actually occupied by German troops in greater or less force. I draw the attention of the public to the fact that a list of the towns and communes in which these attacks have occurred has been drawn up, and that they may expect their punishment when the German troops pass through their neighbourhood.

— Colmar Freiherr von der Goltz

== Prelude ==
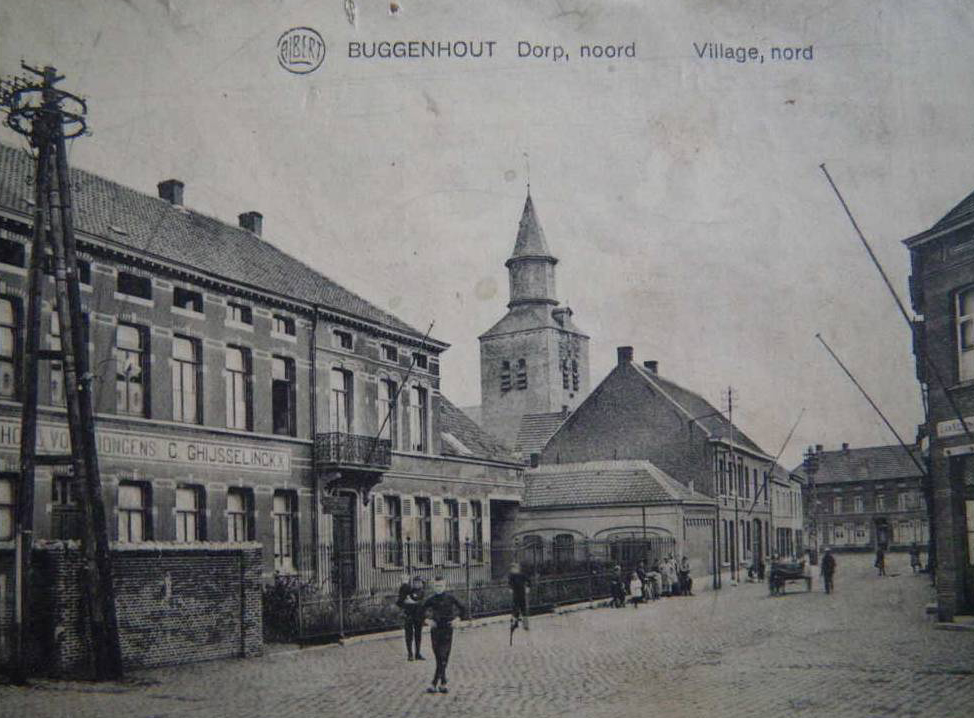
View of Buggenhout in the 1920s

Grand Quartier Général (GQG) the French army general headquarters, requested that the Belgians undertake a substantial new attack on German communications. It was believed to be possible, because the German forces before Antwerp had been reduced to send reinforcements to France. The Belgian general staff selected a region to the west of Brussels for a raid. The Cavalry Division was sent by rail to Ghent, ready to move on Aalst, while the main army in the fourth sector was to march southwards. During the preliminary movements for the sortie, the Belgians found that the German force before Antwerp had been reinforced. The sortie was cancelled, except for a slight westerly movement of the main body of the army and an attack on Landwehr Brigade 37 near Dendermonde. On 26 September, the 4th Division was to advance on Dendermonde and carry out a frontal attack. The 5th Division was to attack the German right flank and the Cavalry Division was to attack on the left flank.

== Action ==
On 26 September, the Germans withdrew from the ruins of Dendermonde on the approach of the 4th Division, which advanced through the town along both banks of the Dender and engaged Landwehr Brigade 37 at Sint-Gillis-bij-Dendermonde, Oudegem and Wieze. The 5th Division advanced cautiously to cover its left flank and engaged the Germans with small detachments. Two battalions tried to cut off the retreat of the brigade by an advance from Buggenhout on Lebbeke, which was occupied as night fell. The Cavalry Division pushed back German detachments guarding the passages of the Dender at Aalst, where the Belgians and Germans engaged each other on opposite banks. Groups of Belgian cavalry pushed on to Asse but Landwehr Brigade 37 escaped the encirclement by skirting Lebbeke on the west in the dusk to reached Opwijk by back roads, where they rejoined the main body early on 27 September. The front line was separated by the Dender, which flows through Aalst.

An old weaver carrying a pail of water across the street in Aalst was bayoneted. In Binnen Straat, houses were set on fire and two men killed. In the Eue des Trois Clefs about forty civilians were dragged from their homes, stripped of their valuables and money and then driven to the river Dender and used as human shields. A Belgian officer in command of a machine-gun commanding the drawbridge signalled to the civilians to throw themselves on the ground and the Belgians fired, forcing the Germans to retreat, who then killed eight or nine civilian prisoners. In the Eue des Trois Clefs, Eue Lenders and Eue de 1'Argents, houses were burnt down and some people who tried to escape from the houses were cut down, c. 40 persons being killed. A German column of 200–300 soldiers left Aalst for the village of Erpe with 25 prisoners, set fire to the houses and killed five or six civilians who tried to escape. A Belgian car with a machine-gun appeared and the Germans placed the hostages from Aalst on the road where two were wounded by Belgian machine-gun fire.

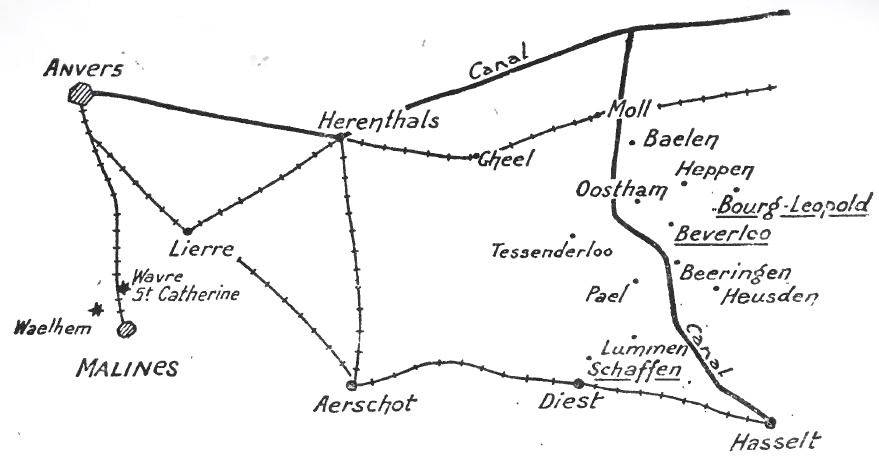
Operations of Belgian volunteers in Limburg and Campine, 1914

At about the same time fighting took place in Campine between the Germans and the 4th Volunteer Regiment, which was composed of recruits. The regiment occupied the camp of Leopoldsburg (Beverloo) and cleared the countryside of German scouting parties. The presence of the volunteers in the Limburg district caused much local disruption to the Germans and on 20 September there was an engagement at Schaffen-lez-Diest between four companies of volunteers and Germans troops. The recruits resisted German attacks for nearly three hours and retreated when the Germans began to envelop their right flank. Another skirmish occurred at Lummen, where over fifty houses were fired by the Germans. A company of volunteers held the bridge over the canal at Beeringen, against much larger forces advancing from the direction of Heusden and Pael. All volunteer companies were sent as reinforcements during the night to Heppen, Beverloo, Beringen, Oostham and Tessenderloo.

At 5:00 a.m. on 27 September, German artillery began to bombard Beringen, as the Belgian volunteers remained concealed in trenches by the canal. The Germans tried to cross the canal by the bridge, which the Belgians had not been able to destroy. Firing from cover the Belgian infantry repulsed the attack but outnumbered 8:1, the Belgians retired from Beringen at 7:00 a.m. through woodland to the Baelen road, where Beringen, Heppen and Oostham were seen to be on fire. Soon afterwards, the Germans entered Leopoldsburg and set fire to some buildings, while the volunteer company escaped through the woods. At 1:00 p.m. the Belgians reached Mol as German troops approached Geel and Meerhout. A group of volunteers occupied the Mol railway station and put outposts by the canal. A German attack began and many civilians were killed in the fighting before the Germans fell back. A group of volunteers then pushed on to Bothy to find that houses in the Grand Place had been sacked and burnt down. Another body of volunteers went to Herenthals and the Belgians returned to Mol the next day, intending to recapture the camp at Leopoldsburg but urgent orders from Headquarters forced them to retire. During the night a Belgian officer drove to Herentals to blow up the railway line. On 28 September, the siege of Antwerp began with the bombardment of forts Waelhem and Sint-Katelijne-Waver, after which Belgian operations in the Limburg district ended.
