= Gertrude I. Johnson =

American educator

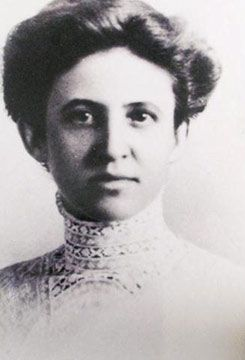
Gertrude I. Johnson

Gertrude I. Johnson (1876–1961) was a college-educated American teacher and co-founder of Johnson & Wales Business School.

== Biography ==
Gertrude Irene Johnson was born in Norristown, Pennsylvania in 1876. She attended Pennsylvania State Normal School (now Millersville University of Pennsylvania) in Millersville, Pennsylvania, graduating 1895.

After receiving a master's degree in 1897, Johnson taught in public schools, then worked in a bank for five years, before returning to teaching at Bryant and Stratton Business School in Providence, Rhode Island (now Bryant University). It was there she teamed up with her old Pennsylvania Normal School classmate Mary T. Wales, who was also teaching at Bryant, to found their own business school.

== School founder ==
In 1914, with fellow teacher Mary T. Wales, she co-founded Johnson & Wales Business School in Providence, Rhode Island. It has grown into the present-day Johnson & Wales University, with two campuses in the United States.

== Retirement and death ==
With Mary in poor health, the two women sold the business school in June 1947 and retired together in Warwick, Rhode Island. Mary died of cancer in 1952. After Mary's death, Gertrude returned to her hometown of Norristown, Pennsylvania and died there in 1961.
