= Rayoh railway station =

Railway station in Malaysia

Rayoh Railway Station Stesen Keretapi Rayoh
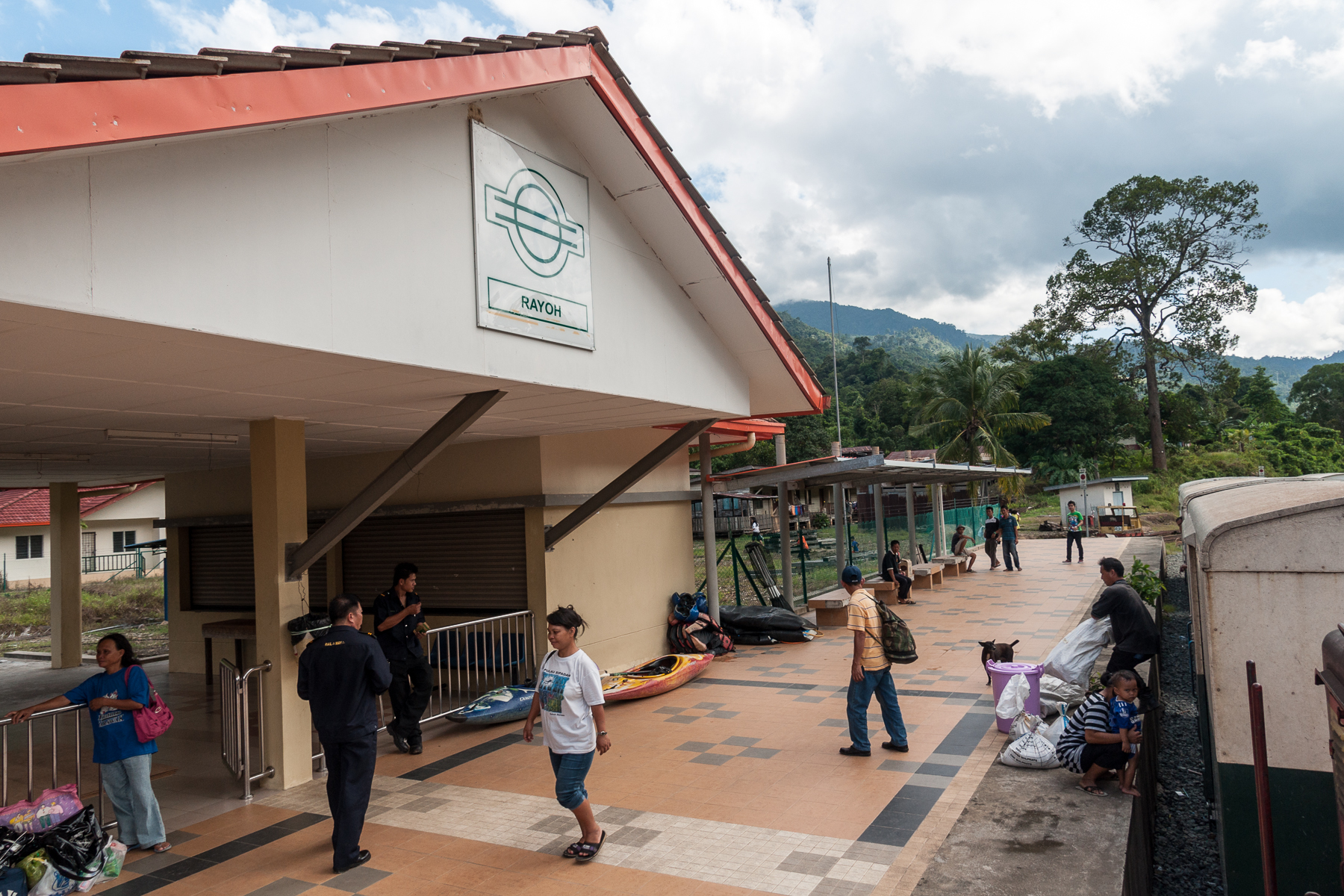
- The station photographed in 2011.

General information
- Location: Rayoh, Tenom, Sabah; Malaysia
- Coordinates: 5°12′31.21″N 115°52′49.78″E
- Owner: Sabah State Railway
- Operator: Sabah State Railway
- Lines: Western Sabah Railway Line (formerly North Borneo Railway Line)
- Platforms: Side platform
- Tracks: Main line (2)

Construction
- Platform levels: 1
- Parking: Yes
- Cycle facilities: No

History
- Opened: 1 August 1914
- Closed: 2007
- Rebuilt: 21 February 2011

Services
| Preceding station | Sabah State Railway | Following station |
|---|---|---|
| Pangi towards Tenom | Western Line | Halogilat towards Secretariat |
Location

Rayoh railway station (Malay: Stesen Keretapi Rayoh) is one of eleven minor railway station on the Western Sabah Railway Line located in Rayoh, Tenom, Sabah, Malaysia.
