= Papar railway station (Malaysia) =

Railway station in Sabah, Malaysia

Papar Railway Station Stesen Keretapi Papar
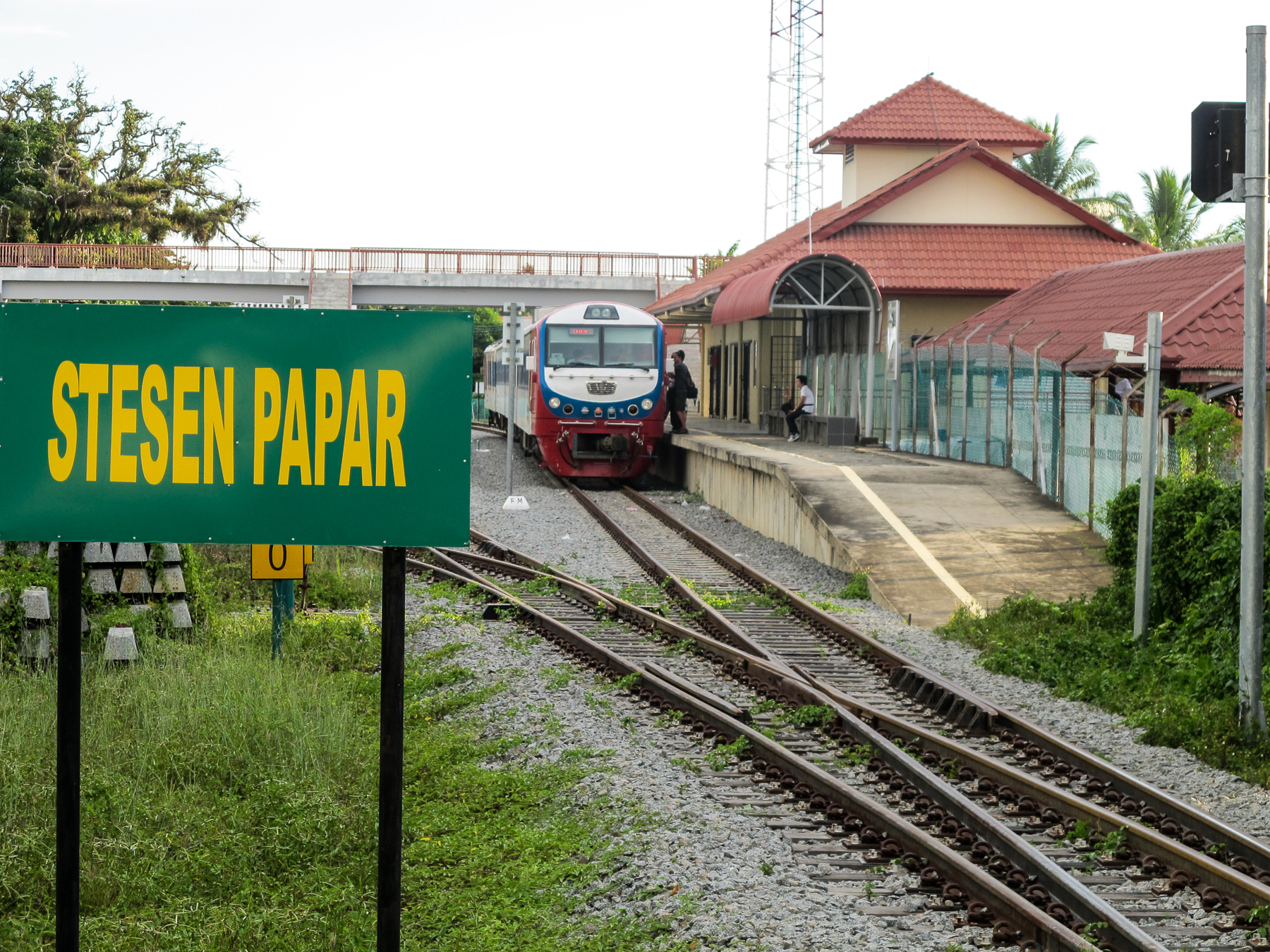
- The station photographed in 2011.

General information
- Location: Papar, Sabah; Malaysia
- Coordinates: 5°43′57.54″N 115°55′56.47″E
- Owner: Sabah State Railway
- Operator: Sabah State Railway
- Lines: Western Sabah Railway Line (formerly North Borneo Railway Line)
- Platforms: Side platform
- Tracks: Main line (2)

Construction
- Platform levels: 1
- Parking: Yes
- Cycle facilities: No

History
- Opened: 1 August 1914
- Closed: 2007
- Rebuilt: 21 February 2011

Services
Preceding station	Sabah State Railway	Following station
Kimanis towards Tenom	Western Line	Kawang towards Secretariat
Location

Papar railway station (Malay: Stesen Keretapi Papar) is one of four main railway station on the Western Sabah Railway Line located in Papar, Sabah, Malaysia.

== History ==
As part of the development of rail networks in North Borneo, construction of rail networks has started since 1896 with Papar have become one of economic production site in the West Coast Division as sago mills began to appear in the area as well in Beaufort. Full operation service of the North Borneo Railway was launched on 1 August 1914. During World War II, a railway bridge crossing the Papar River was destroyed while the railway station was ridden with bullets following the heavy fighting between the Australian and Japanese forces.

In 2007, the station was closed for renovation works with the station building which was originally built from wood being demolished and replaced with a new concrete building. The present station began its operation on 21 February 2011. In 2016, new diesel multiple unit (DMUs) from Japan for use in the Tanjung Aru–Beaufort lines was introduced. A tourist stop centre is set to be built near the station in 2017.
