= Bongawan railway station =

Railway station in Malaysia

Bongawan Railway Station Stesen Keretapi Bongawan
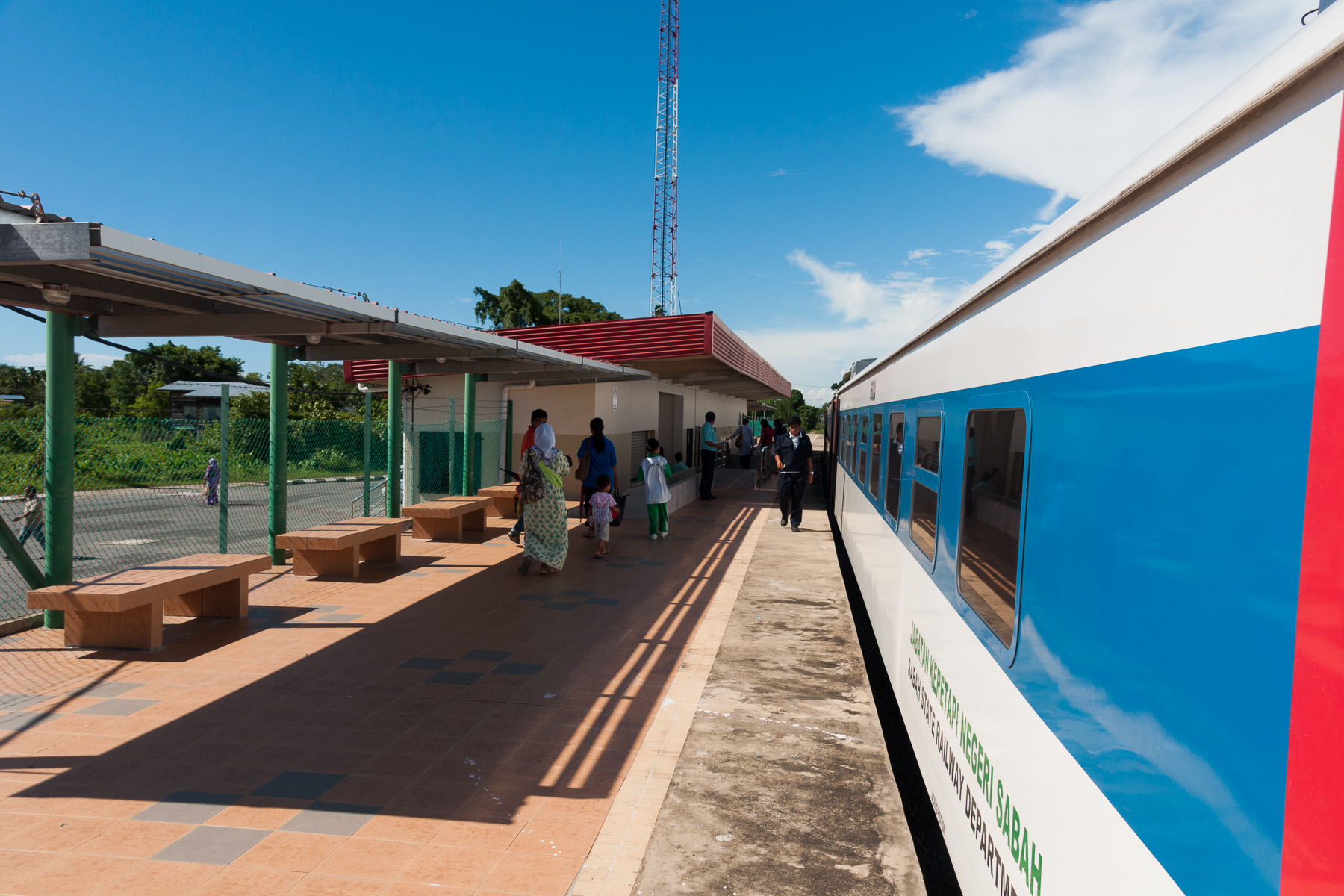
- The station photographed in 2011.

General information
- Location: Bongawan, Papar, Sabah; Malaysia
- Coordinates: 5°32′22.06″N 115°51′21.88″E
- Owner: Sabah State Railway
- Operator: Sabah State Railway
- Lines: Western Sabah Railway Line (formerly North Borneo Railway Line)
- Platforms: Side platform
- Tracks: Main line (2)

Construction
- Platform levels: 1
- Parking: Yes
- Cycle facilities: No

History
- Opened: 1 August 1914
- Closed: 2007
- Rebuilt: 21 February 2011

Services
Preceding station	Sabah State Railway	Following station
Membakut towards Tenom	Western Line	Kimanis towards Secretariat
Location
- Location within Borneo Location within Malaysia

Bongawan railway station (Malay: Stesen Keretapi Bongawan) is one of eleven minor railway station on the Western Sabah Railway Line located in Bongawan, Papar, Sabah, Malaysia.
