= Pangi railway station =

Railway station in Malaysia

Pangi Railway Station Stesen Keretapi Pangi
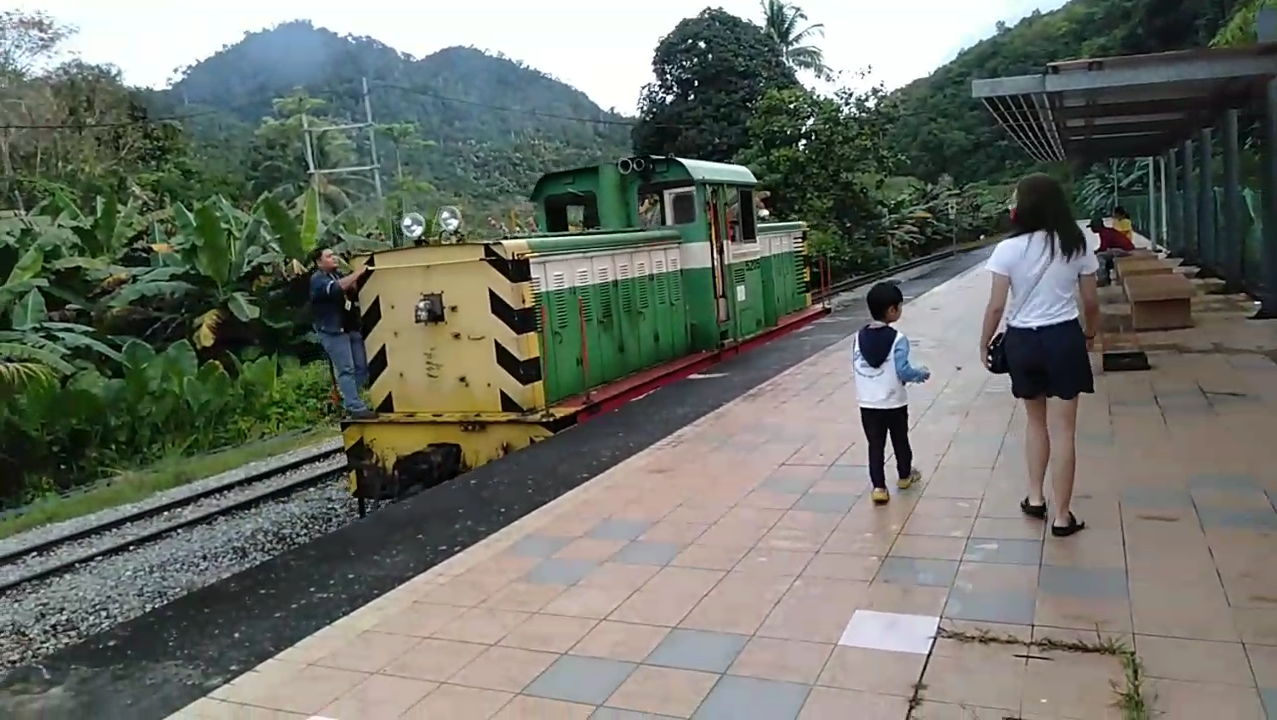
- The station photographed in 2022.

General information
- Location: Pangi, Tenom, Sabah; Malaysia
- Coordinates: 5°8′24.07″N 115°51′58.32″E
- Owner: Sabah State Railway
- Operator: Sabah State Railway
- Lines: Western Sabah Railway Line (formerly North Borneo Railway Line)
- Platforms: Side platform
- Tracks: Main line (2)

Construction
- Platform levels: 1
- Parking: Yes
- Cycle facilities: No

History
- Opened: 1 August 1914
- Closed: 2007
- Rebuilt: 21 February 2011

Services
Preceding station	Sabah State Railway	Following station
Tenom Terminus	Western Line	Rayoh towards Secretariat
Location

Pangi railway station (Malay: Stesen Keretapi Pangi) is one of eleven minor railway station on the Western Sabah Railway Line located in Pangi, Tenom, Sabah, Malaysia.
