= Membakut railway station =

Railway station in Membakut, Sabah, Malaysia

Membakut Railway Station Stesen Keretapi Membakut
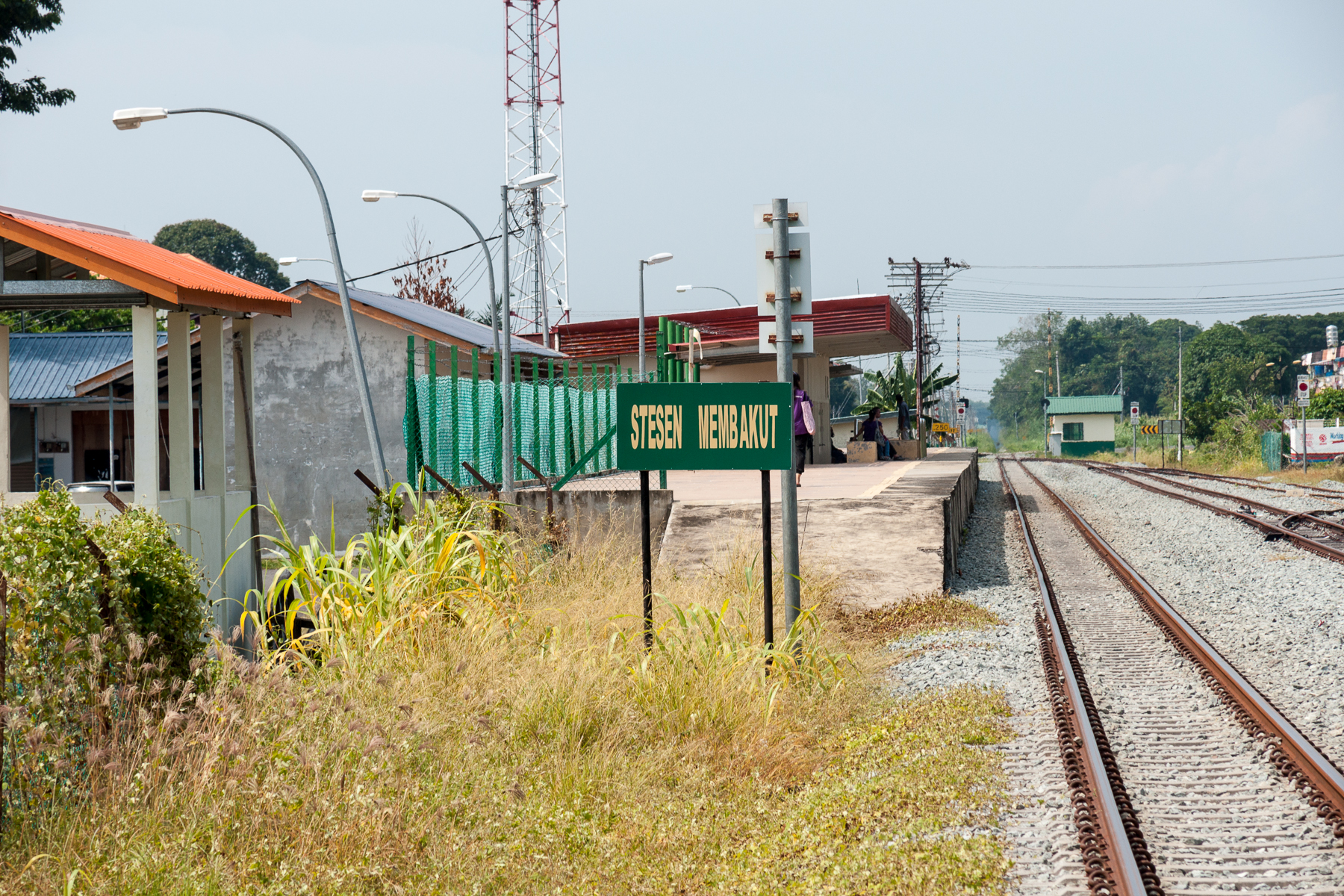
- The station photographed in 2011.

General information
- Location: Membakut, Beaufort, Sabah; Malaysia
- Coordinates: 5°28′20.96″N 115°47′47.78″E
- Owner: Sabah State Railway
- Operator: Sabah State Railway
- Lines: Western Sabah Railway Line (formerly North Borneo Railway Line)
- Platforms: Side platform
- Tracks: Main line (2)

Construction
- Platform levels: 1
- Parking: Yes
- Cycle facilities: No

History
- Opened: 1 August 1914
- Closed: 2007
- Rebuilt: 21 February 2011

Services
Preceding station	Sabah State Railway	Following station
Beaufort towards Tenom	Western Line	Bongawan towards Secretariat
Location

Membakut railway station (Malay: Stesen Keretapi Membakut) is one of eleven minor railway stations on the Western Sabah Railway Line located in Membakut, Beaufort, Sabah, Malaysia.
