= Papar railway station =

Papar railway station may also refer to:

- Papar railway station (Indonesia), a railway station on the Bangil–Kertosono railway located in Papar, Kediri Regency, Indonesia.
- Papar railway station (Malaysia), a railway station on the Western Sabah Railway Line located in Papar, Sabah, Malaysia.
