= Tenom District =

Tenom District Daerah Tenom
- District
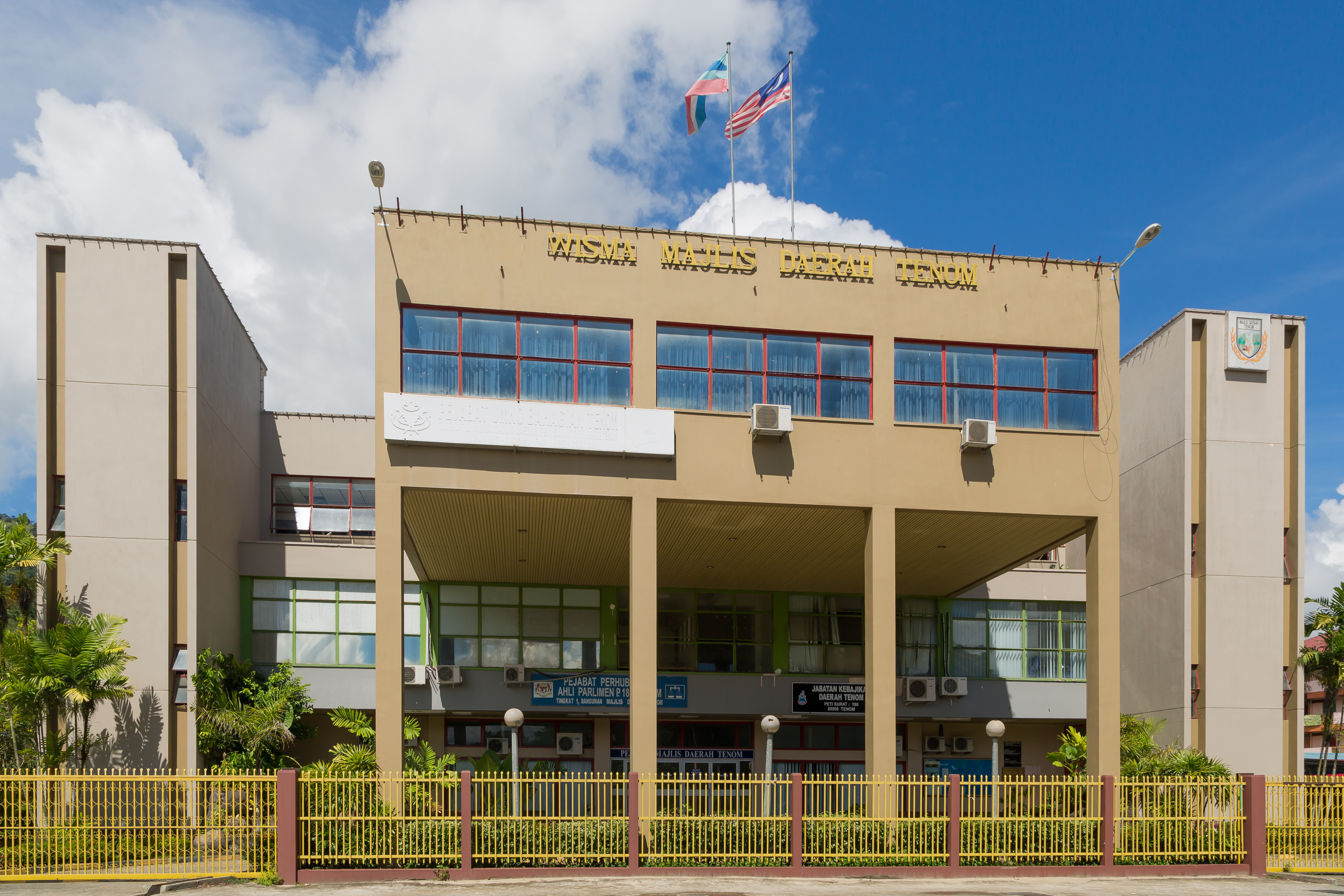
- Tenom District Council office.

- Seal

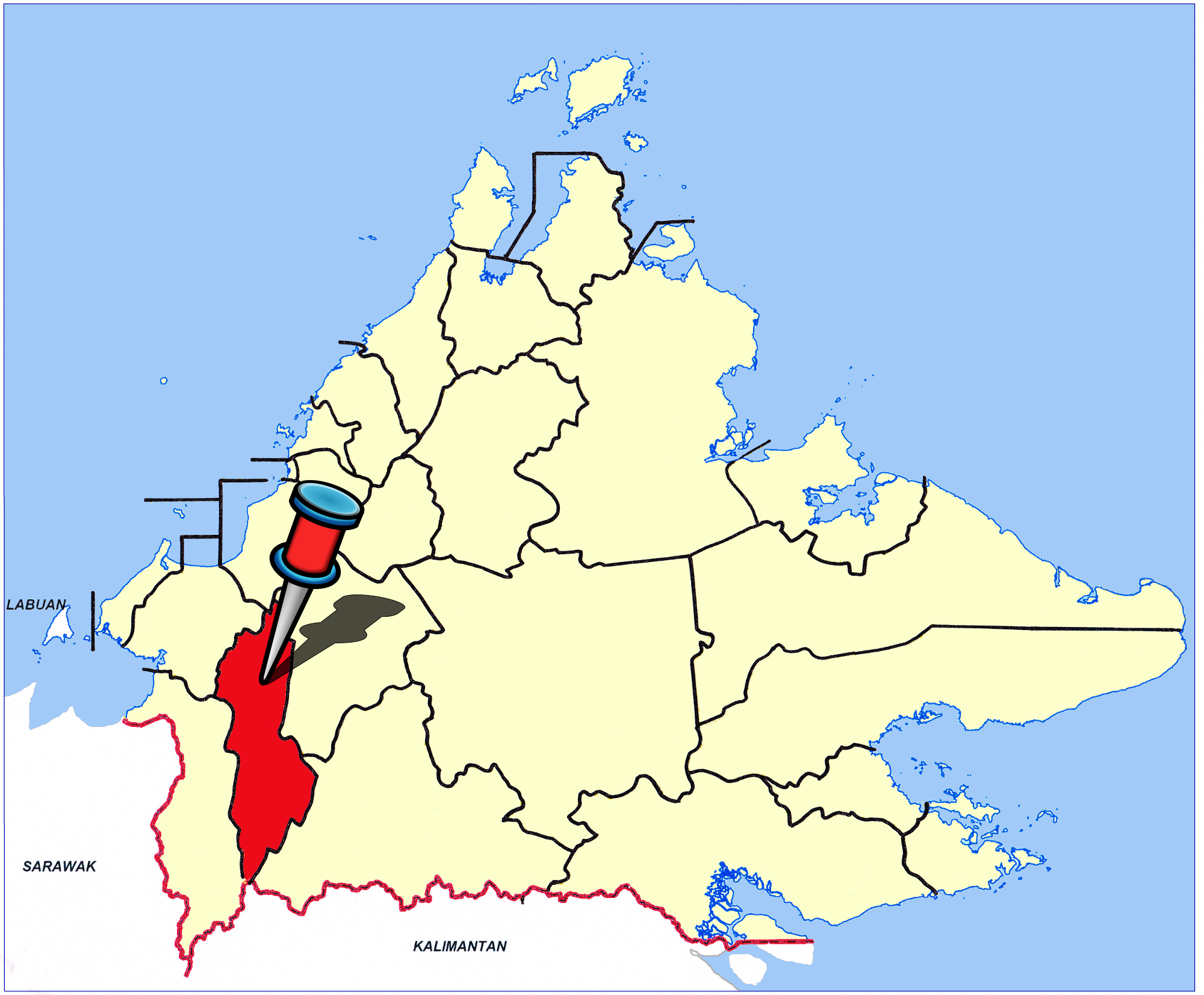
- Coordinates: 5°8′00″N 115°57′00″E
- Country: Malaysia
- State: Sabah
- Division: Interior
- Capital: Tenom

Government
  - District Officer: Siriman M. F. Basir

Area
  - Total: 2,409 km^{2} (930 sq mi)

Population (2010)
  - Total: 55,553
- Website: mdtenom.sbh.gov.my pdtenom.sbh.gov.my

Map of Tenom District

The Tenom District (Malay: Daerah Tenom) is an administrative district in the Malaysian state of Sabah, part of the Interior Division which includes the districts of Beaufort, Keningau, Kuala Penyu, Nabawan, Sipitang, Tambunan and Tenom. The capital of the district is in Tenom Town. Majority of the indigenous inhabitants in Tenom is Murut along with significant minorities of Dusun and Lundayeh.

== Etymology ==
The area was first called "Fort Birch" which named after North Borneo Governor Ernest Woodford Birch. Following the completion of the North Borneo Railway Line from Beaufort railway station to Tenom and Melalap railway stations, the place was subsequently renamed as "Tenom" in 1904.

== History ==
The district was established in the 1900s by the North Borneo Chartered Company with first district officer named M.C.M. Weedon. The opening of Tenom by the British began with the opening of Sapong Estate and Melalap Estate.

== Demographics ==
The population is made up of ethnic groups Murut (52%), Kadazan-Dusun (12%), Chinese (8%), Lun Bawang/Lundayeh (5%) and Malay (4%) together with a small proportion of other ethnic groups such as Indonesians and Filipinos. The majority of nearly 5,000 Chinese, descendants of immigrants from Longchuan in Guangdong, come from the ethnic group of Hakka. The population of the district according to the 2010 census is 55,553 inhabitants.

The population is made up of ethnicities as follows:

Ethnics Group in Tenom District
Ethnics	Percent
Murut	52%
Kadazan-Dusun	12%
Chinese	8%
Lun Bawang / Lundayeh	5%
Malay	4%
Others	19%

== Geography ==
The Tenom District is located in the southwest of Sabah. The district is completely bounded by several district borders Keningau to the northeast, Nabawan to the southeast, Sipitang to the west and Beaufort to the northwest. The district also shared district with North Kalimantan of Indonesia on its southern end. Tenom consist of flat to gently undulating valley floor, with its rugged area consist of rolling hill with valley and steep mountainous terrain, with its highest point is Mount Malutut, located within the Crocker Range. Other river including Padas River and its tributaries, Pegalan River, which can flow into the nearby Witti Range.

== Gallery ==
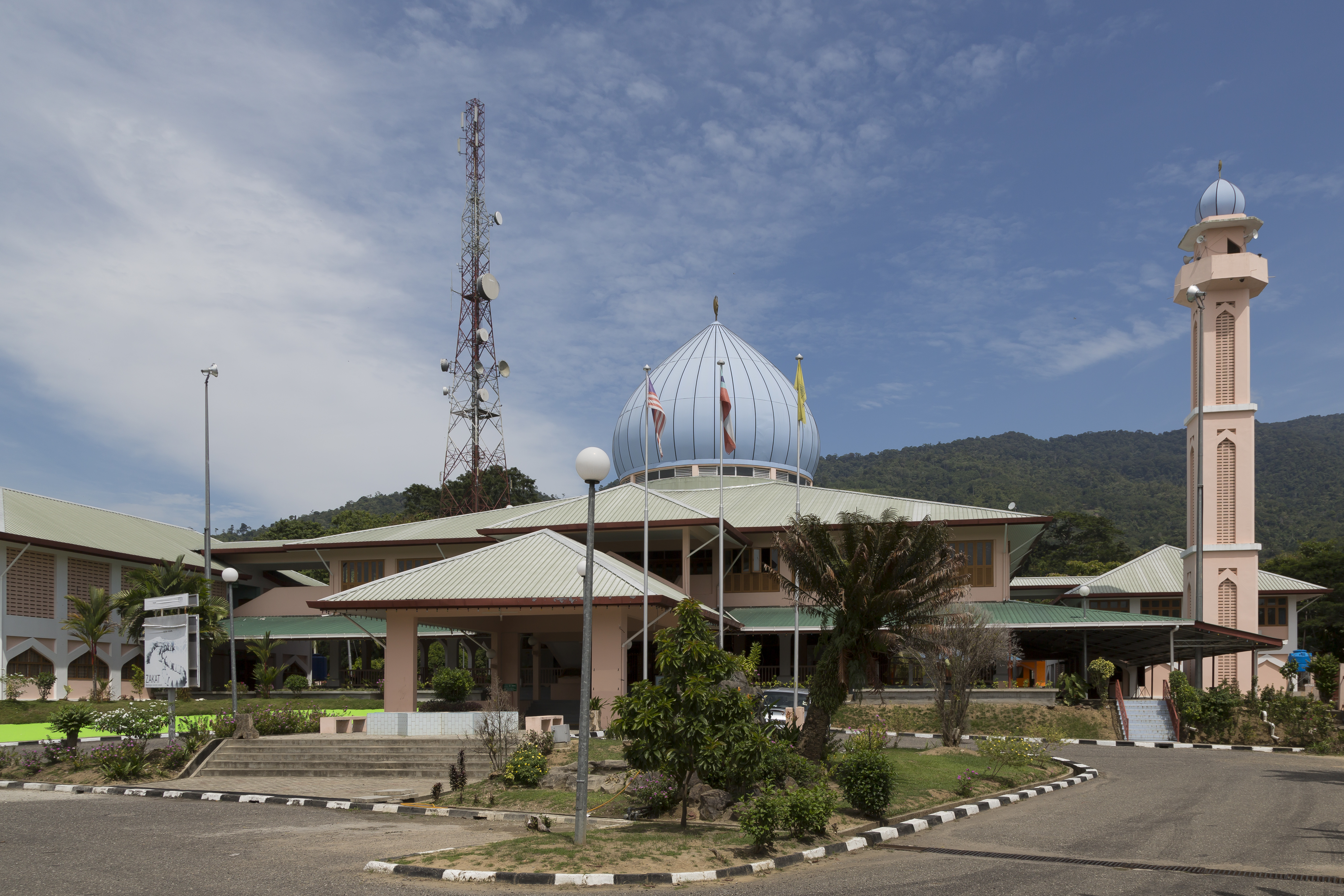
Ar Rahman Mosque.

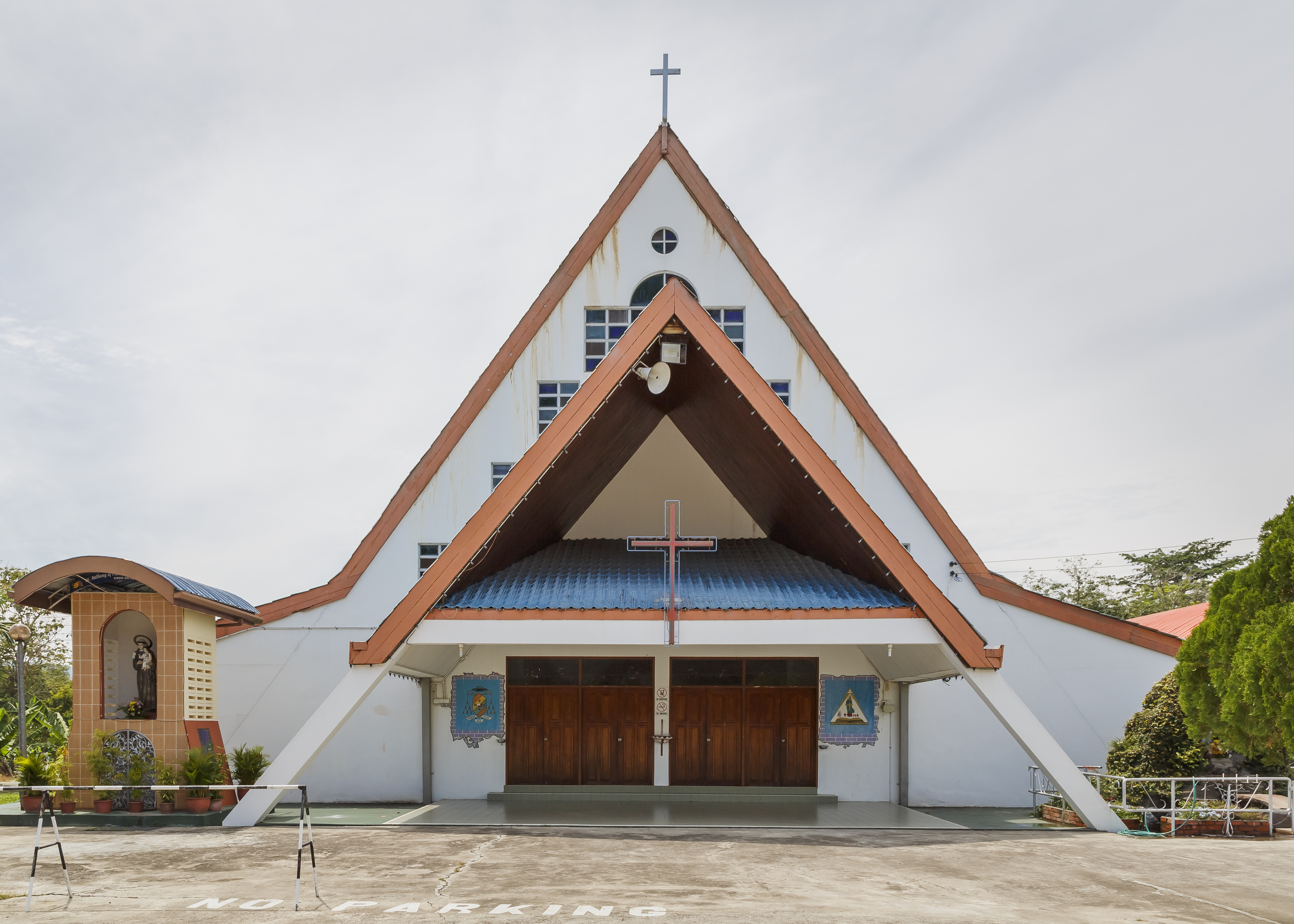
St. Anthony Catholic Church.

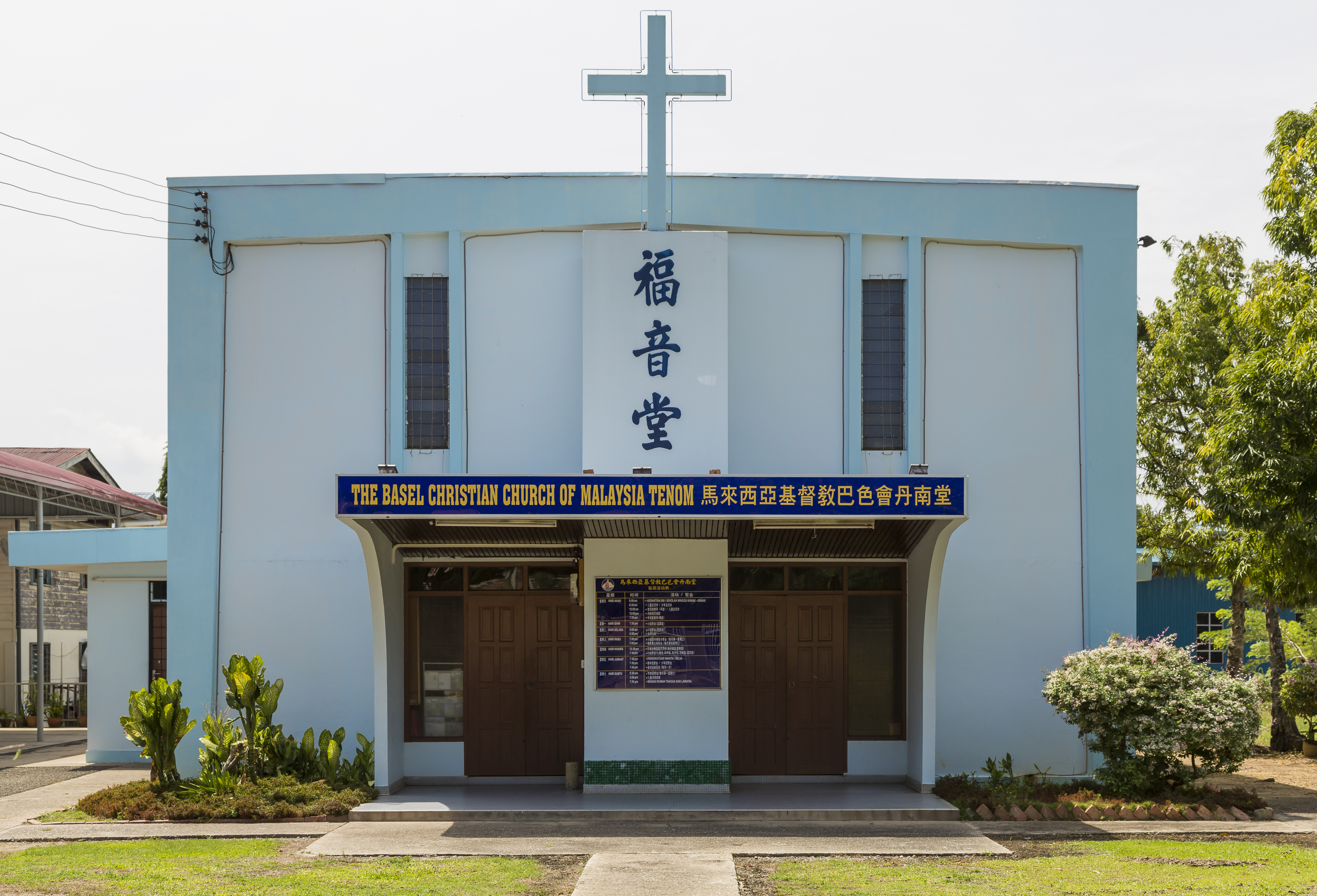
Tenom Basel Church.

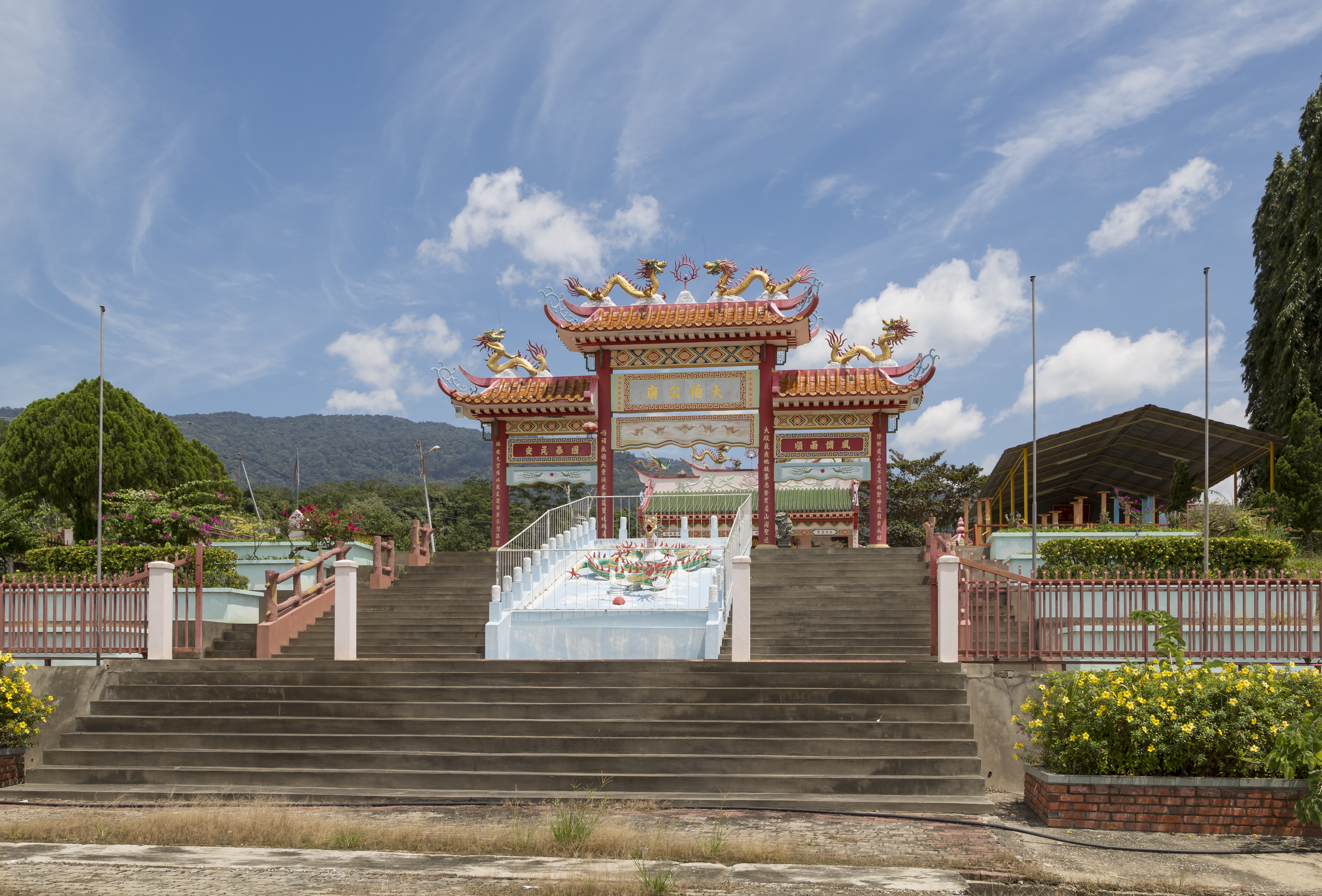
Tak Pak Kung Temple.

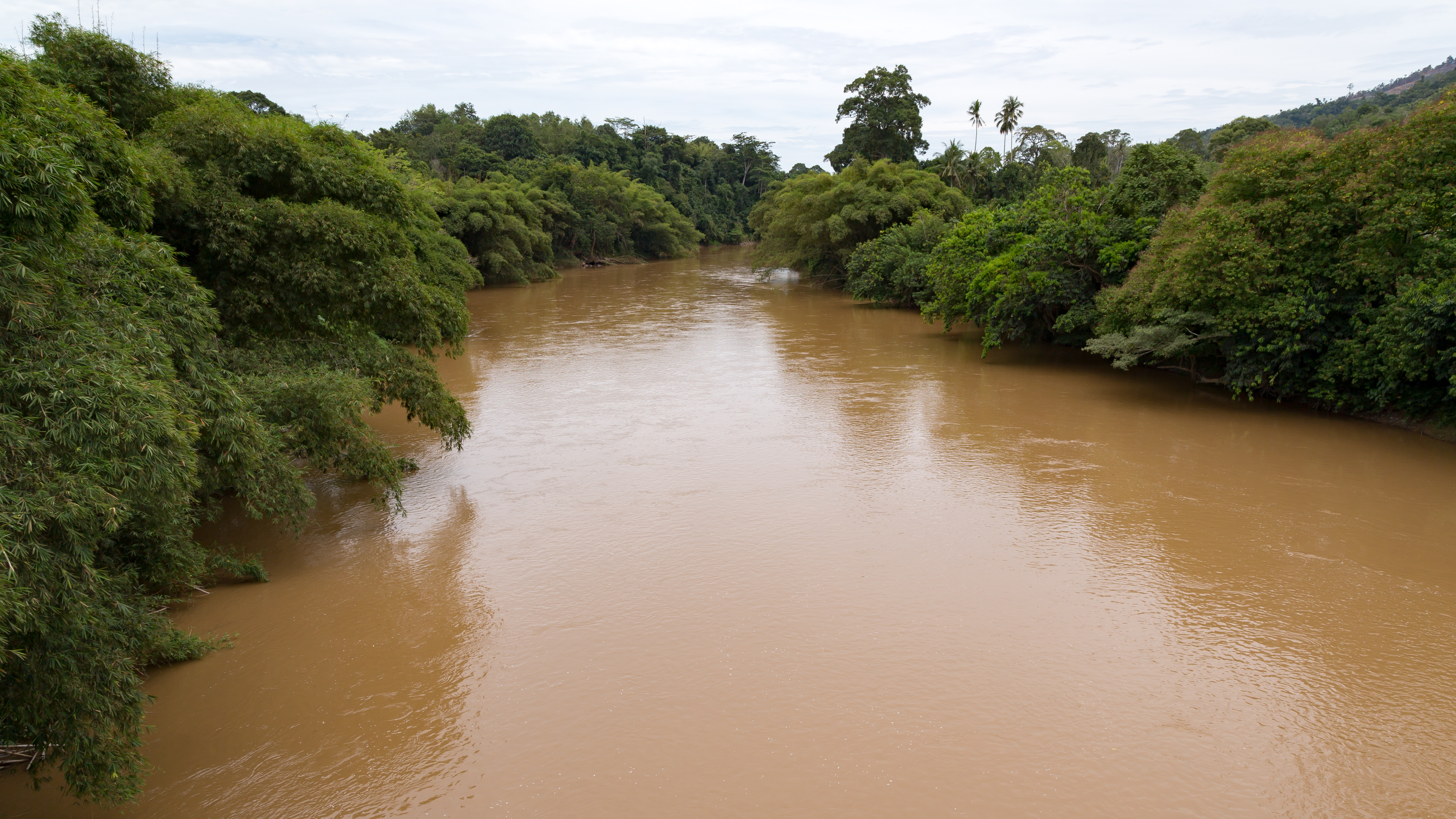
Padas River.

== See also ==
- Districts of Malaysia
