= Kampung Pimping =

Village in Malaysia

Coordinates: 5°29′N 115°46′E

Kampung Pimping is a Malay Brunei ethnic's village located in Membakut sub-District of Beaufort District in Sabah, Malaysia.
