= Yit Foh Tenom Coffee =

Malaysian coffee company

Yit Foh Coffee Factory Sdn Bhd
- Type: Private Limited Company
- Industry: Coffee
- Founded: 1960; 66 years ago in Tenom District, Sabah, Malaysia
- Founder: Mr. Yong Loong Vun
- Headquarters: Kg. Chinta Mata, Tenom, Malaysia
- Key people: Alex Yong Fui Chiang
- Website: www.yitfohcoffee.com

Yit Foh Coffee Factory Sdn Bhd (doing business as Yit Foh Tenom Coffee) is the main coffee producer in the state of Sabah, Malaysia since 1960. Founded by Mr. Yong Loong Vun in Kg. Chinta Mata on the district of Tenom, it is the oldest coffee company for Sabah. The company is owned by the Yit Foh Coffee Factory Sdn Bhd and is halal-certified.

== History ==
The company is one of the producer of Tenom coffee (Kopi Tenom) and recognised as the oldest operator has been operating since 1960. Founded by Mr. Yong Loong Vun in Kampung Chinta Mata of Tenom District, it still produce coffee grounds in traditional way by roasting coffee bean over woodfire to bring out the true aroma of coffee. Since been inherited by Alex Yong, a new factory was opened in 1993 and now is intend to expand the market globally. The biggest competitor of this company is the Fatt Choi Tenom Coffee, which also come from the same district although the company is recently established in 1986.

== See also ==
- List of coffee companies
