= North Eastern Sabah Railway Line =

Proposed railway line in Malaysia

The North Eastern Sabah Railway Line (Malay: Laluan Keretapi Utara Timur Sabah) is a proposed railway line from the city of Kota Kinabalu that would connect Kudat, Sandakan and Tawau as part of the Sabah State Railway line extension plan. The plan was supported by the Malaysian federal government represented by Transport Minister Liow Tiong Lai on 17 September 2015. On 21 March 2017, the study to establish the line to Kudat started, with around RM1 million being allocated.

Until 2021, Sabah Deputy Chief Minister Bung Mokhtar Radin explained that the proposed line was still in the planning stage with the study to be implemented by the following year, in 2022.

== Expansion proposal and connection of Borneo railway systems ==
Once the project is complete, there is also a proposal to connect the rail networks of Sabah and Sarawak in Malaysia with the provinces of Kalimantan in Indonesia that will be called the Trans-Borneo Railway, as Indonesia is currently developing the railway network on its side.

== See also ==
- Western Sabah Railway Line
- Rail transport in Malaysia
