= Papar, Malaysia =

Papar
- Town and district capital
- Pekan Papar; Papar Town

Other transcription(s)
  - Jawi: ڤاڤر
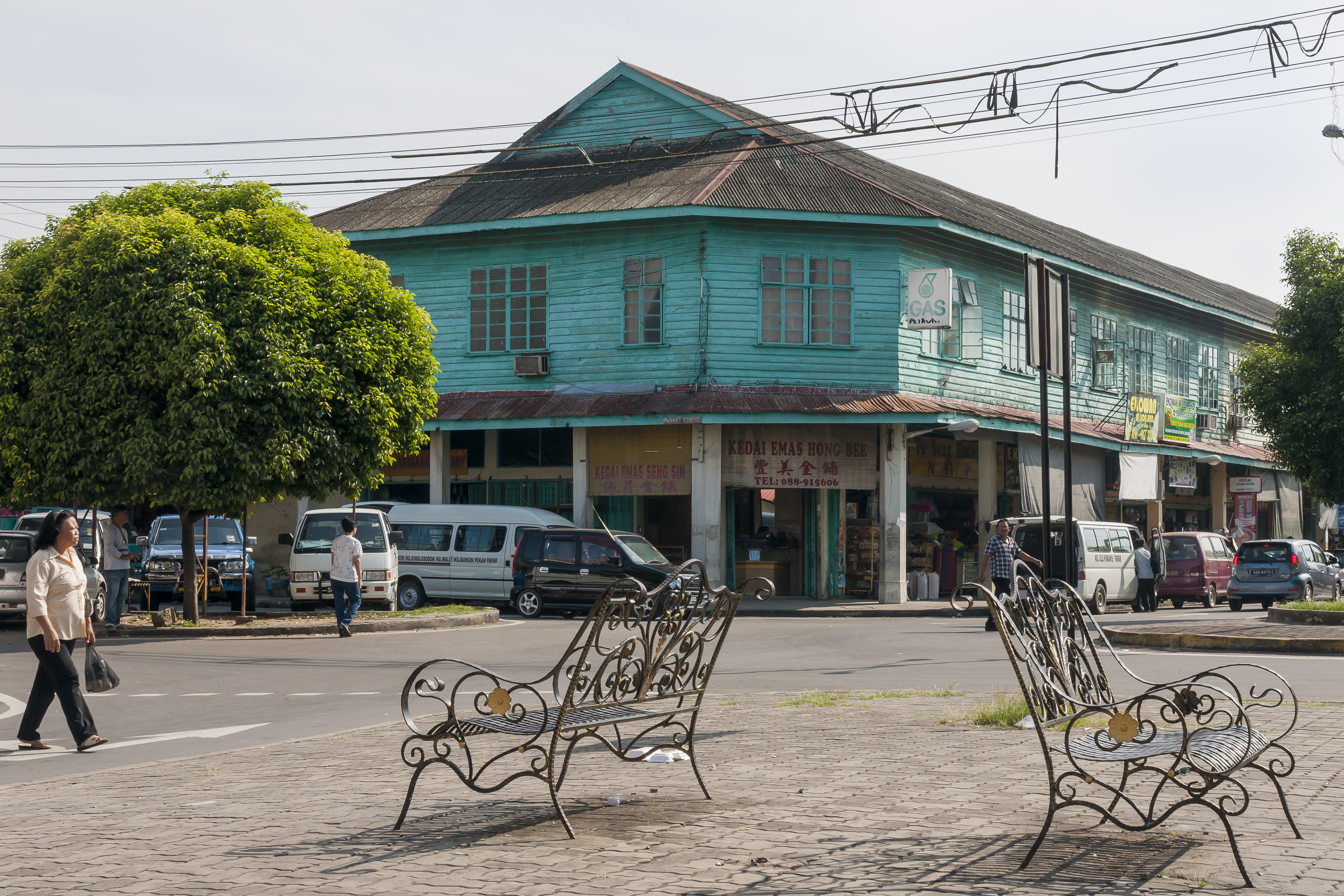
- Colonial-era shoplots in Papar town.
- Etymology: Brunei word "Tanah Rata"
- Location of Papar Town in Papar District

- Location within Borneo
- Coordinates: 5°44′00″N 115°56′00″E
- Country: Malaysia
- State: Sabah
- Division: West Coast
- District: Papar
- Administration: Papar District Council

Government
  - Body: Papar District Council
  - District Officer: Mohd Fuad Abdullah
  - Executive Officer: Ahmad Jaludin Abd Karim
  - MP: Yang Berhormat Datuk Armizan Mohd Ali

Population (2020)
  - Total: 98,452
- The population around Papar only and does not include the whole district of Papar administration.
- Time zone: UTC+8 (MST)
- Postal code: 89608
- Area code: 088
- Neighbourhood Area: Kinarut, Benoni, Kimanis
- Tamu (Weekly Local Market): Sunday
- Number plate: SA (1980-2018); SY (2018-2023); SJ (2023-)
- Website: mdpapar.sabah.gov.my pdpapar.sabah.gov.my

Papar (Malay: Pekan Papar) is the capital of the Papar District in the West Coast Division of Sabah, Malaysia. Its population was estimated to be around 124,420 in 2010, which is divided between Bruneian Malay (particularly in the villages of Benoni, Buang Sayang, Bongawan, Kampung Laut, Kelanahan, Takis, Kimanis and Kinarut), Kadazan-Dusun (concentrated in the villages of Rampazan, Limbahau, Kinarut, Kopimpinan, Lakut, Mondolipau, Kinuta, Bungug, Padawan, Koiduan, Ulu Kimanis, Sumbiling and Limputung), and Bajau (mostly in the villages of Pengalat Besar, Pengalat Kecil, Kawang, Kuala, Sg Padang and Beringgis). There is also a sizeable Chinese minority (including those of mixed-race or Sino-Native origin), predominantly of the Hakka subgroup, as well as smaller numbers of other races. The town is located 38 kilometres south of the state capital of Kota Kinabalu, with the Papar railway station in the town becoming one of the main stops of the Sabah State Railway.

The Papar area is characterised by low-lying coastal areas which extend inland towards the Crocker Range. Such land was traditionally used for growing rice, and the flat paddy fields once common in the district may have given it its name. Despite the rapid expansion of Kota Kinabalu, the district is still dominated by paddy fields, which are largely worked by natives, and fruit orchards, most of which belong to the ethnic Chinese minority. The town itself occupies the southern banks of the Papar River not far from the sea. There are also areas of tidal wetland that are home to mangrove trees and saltwater palm or nipah. Both banks are connected by two steel-concrete bridges, one (with a railway bridge) connecting directly into the town itself, and another much farther upriver (on the old Kota Kinabalu-Papar road) leading into the paddy plantation hamlets. The town has seen considerable growth in recent years but still preserves some of its older buildings and features. Important architectural features which can be seen in the Papar town includes the District Office, Papar Public Library, Papar Public Park, New Papar Market, OKK Mahali Park (which constitutes a large part of the new town), Salleh Sulong Hall and a new bigger Papar Community Hall which also hosts a weekly wet market on its compounds, a sports complex with a field, a stand and a gymnasium, and the new train station, which doubles as a bus and minivan station which serves the Kota Kinabalu-Papar-Beaufort route.

The well-known Shaw Brothers film company once operated Papar's sole cinema, called New Gaiety. It closed in the 1990s; however, a nearby street is still named Jalan Cinema ("Cinema Road") after the now-defunct theatre. Despite repair and refurbishment over the years, the Papar railway bridge looks much as it did in the Second World War. It featured in Allied plans to retake North Borneo from the Japanese Army. References to it and the Papar River can be found in reports on the Agas and Semut covert intelligence operations, and later in the Stallion and Oboe 6 attack plans.

Papar is a major hub for the proselytisation of Islam on the west coast of Sabah, owing to its large Muslim community. The district's first mosque was built near the Kampung Laut area around 1890. It is now known as the Masjid Daerah Papar (Papar District Mosque). Other mosques in the district include the Masjid Pekan Bongawan (Bongawan Town Mosque) and Masjid Haji Mohammad Yaakob (Haji Mohammad Yaakob Mosque), located in Bongawan and Beringgis respectively. Beside the Muslim population, the Christian population has been estimated to have grown to about half of the total population in 2016. There are three Catholic churches and one Eastern Orthodox Church in the town centre, namely, St. Joseph which is located in Papar town, The Holy Rosary Church in Limbahau, St. Paul Parish in Jalan Kelatuan Gadong and St. Patrick Kinuta together with other Christian denominations such as Basel, Anglican, Seventh-Day Adventist (SDA) and Borneo Evangelical Church (Sidang Injil Borneo - SIB). A number of Chinese temples are also located around the district and town centre with the presence of many Chinese population there.

== Climate ==
Papar has a tropical rainforest climate (Af) with heavy rainfall year-round.

Climate data for Papar
Month	Jan	Feb	Mar	Apr	May	Jun	Jul	Aug	Sep	Oct	Nov	Dec	Year
Mean daily maximum °C (°F)	29.9 (85.8)	29.9 (85.8)	30.6 (87.1)	31.5 (88.7)	31.7 (89.1)	31.3 (88.3)	31.1 (88.0)	31.0 (87.8)	30.7 (87.3)	30.6 (87.1)	30.4 (86.7)	30.1 (86.2)	30.7 (87.3)
Daily mean °C (°F)	26.5 (79.7)	26.5 (79.7)	27.0 (80.6)	27.8 (82.0)	28.0 (82.4)	27.6 (81.7)	27.4 (81.3)	27.3 (81.1)	27.1 (80.8)	27.1 (80.8)	26.9 (80.4)	26.7 (80.1)	27.2 (80.9)
Mean daily minimum °C (°F)	23.1 (73.6)	23.1 (73.6)	23.5 (74.3)	24.1 (75.4)	24.3 (75.7)	24.0 (75.2)	23.7 (74.7)	23.7 (74.7)	23.6 (74.5)	23.6 (74.5)	23.5 (74.3)	23.4 (74.1)	23.6 (74.6)
Average rainfall mm (inches)	162 (6.4)	85 (3.3)	103 (4.1)	164 (6.5)	281 (11.1)	296 (11.7)	288 (11.3)	263 (10.4)	326 (12.8)	353 (13.9)	315 (12.4)	274 (10.8)	2,910 (114.7)
Source: Climate-Data.org

== Gallery ==
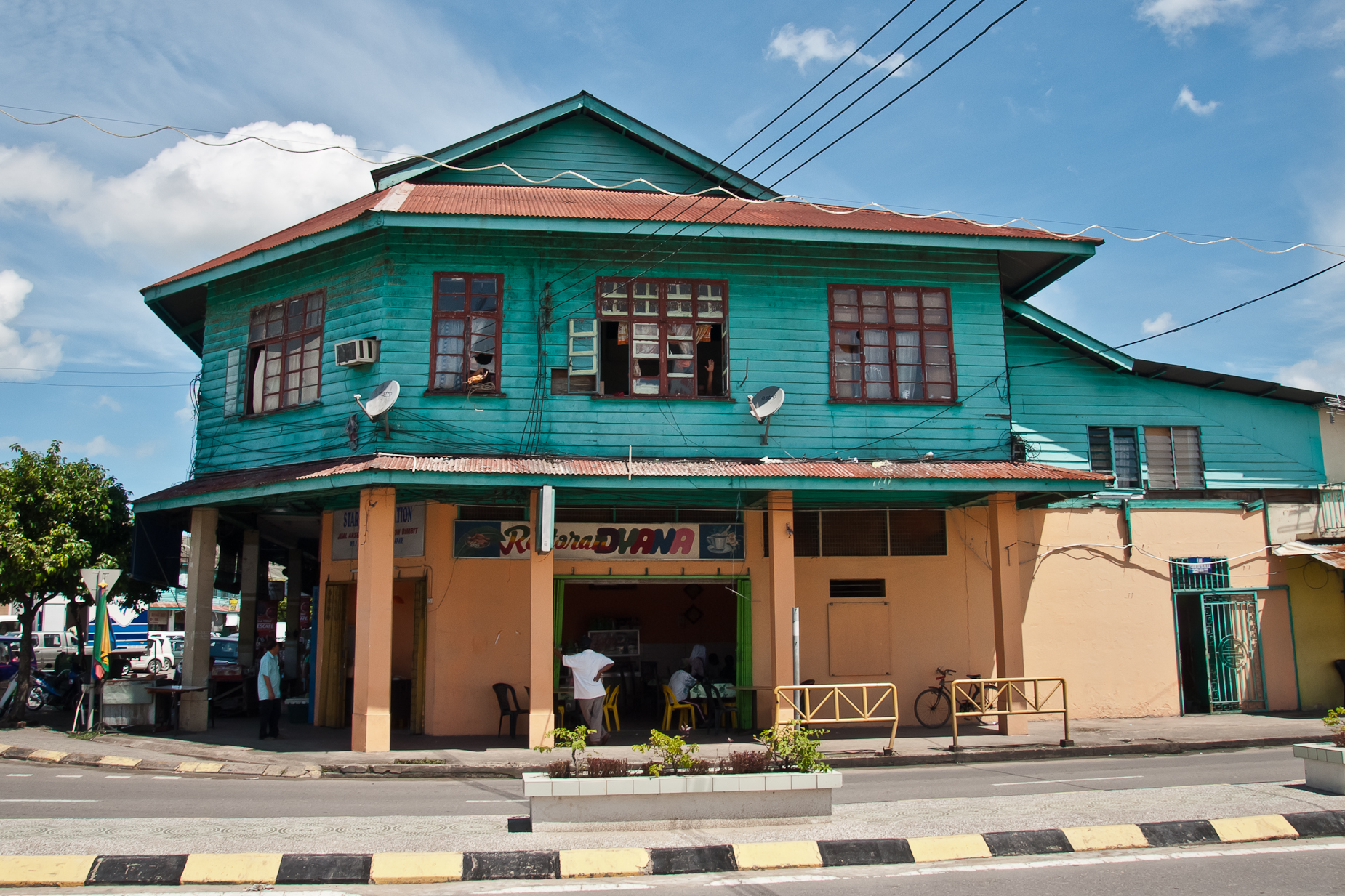
One of the old shops of Papar.

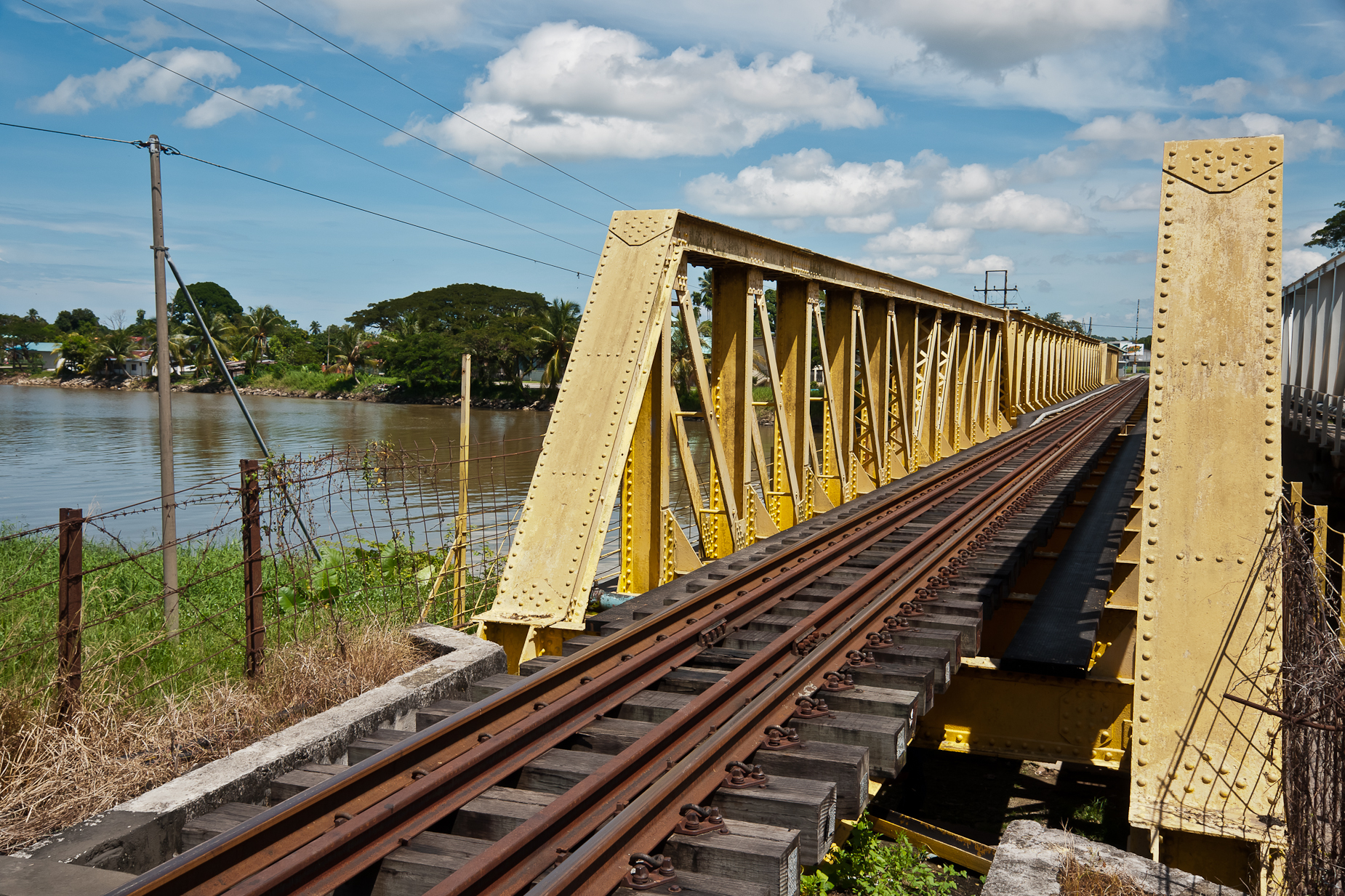
Papar railway bridge.

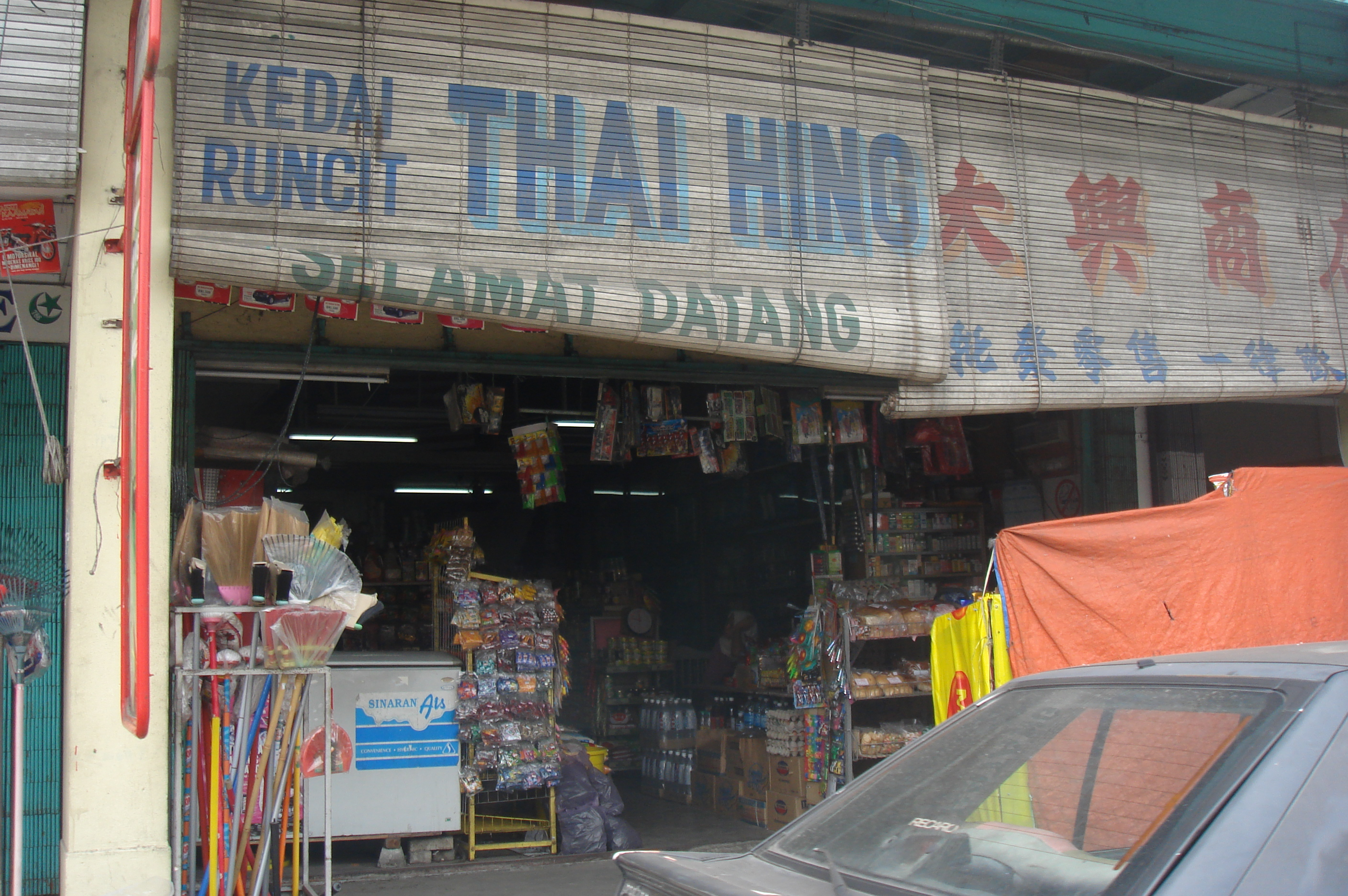
Chinese-owned sundry shop in Papar town.

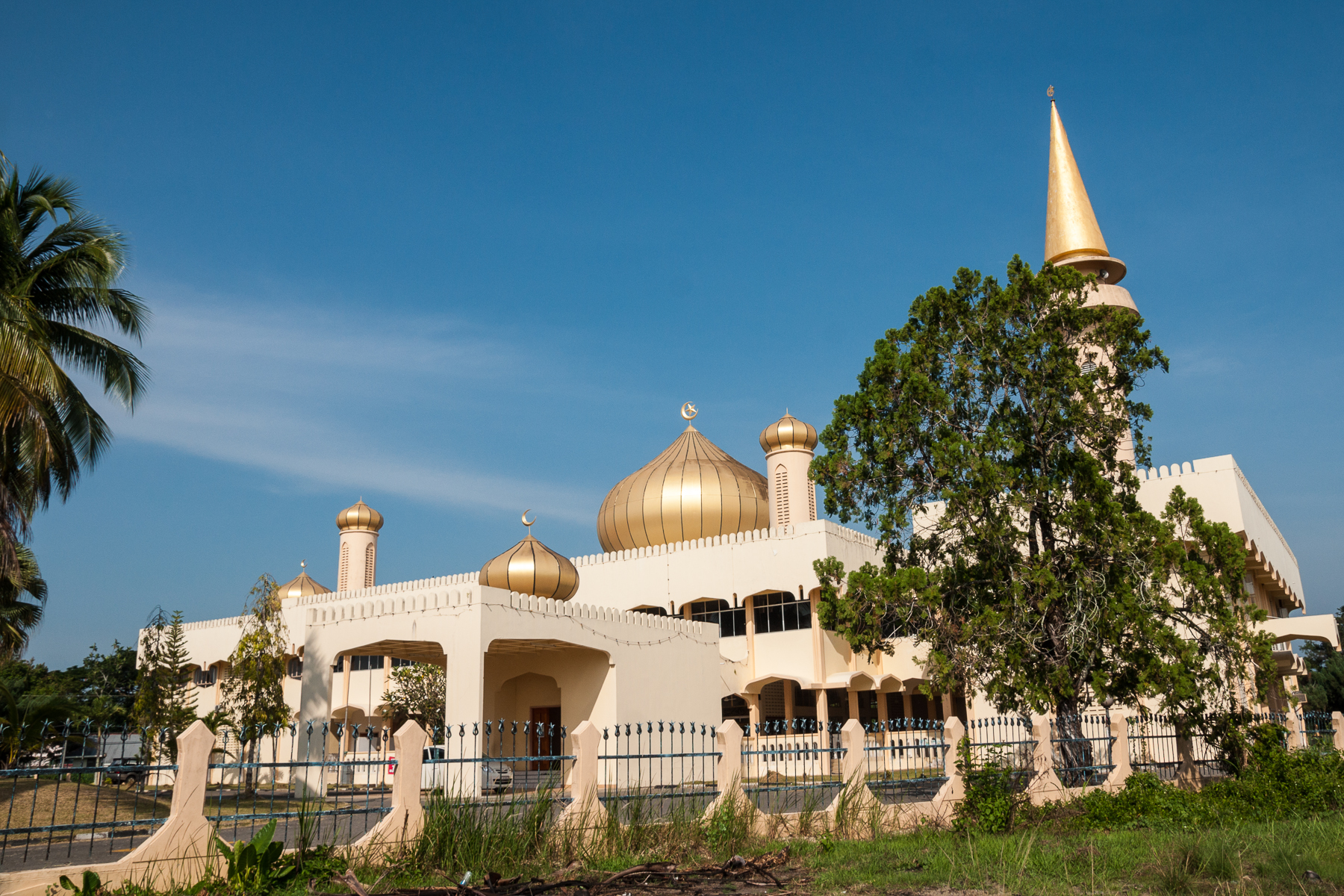
Papar District Mosque.

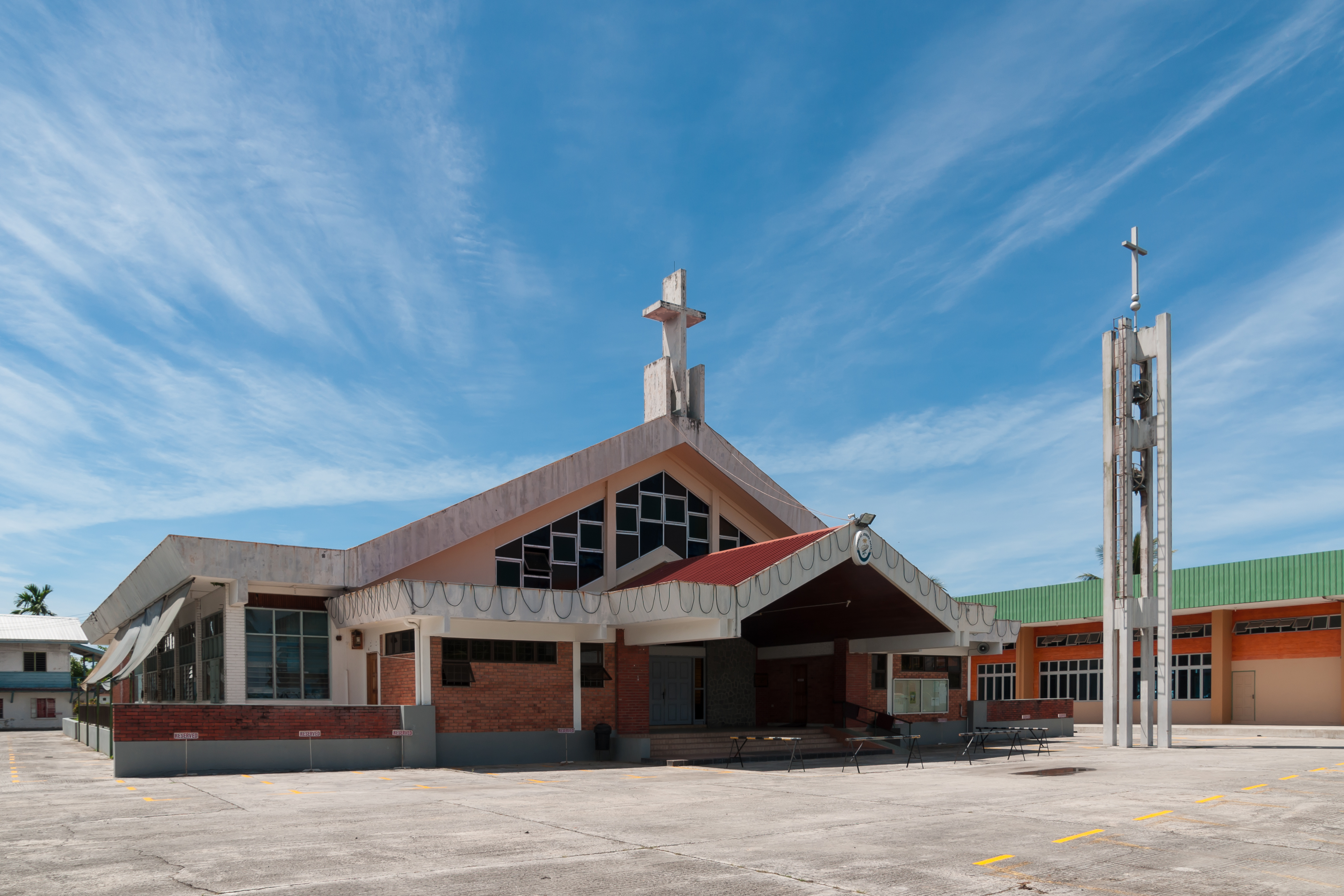
St. Joseph Catholic Church.

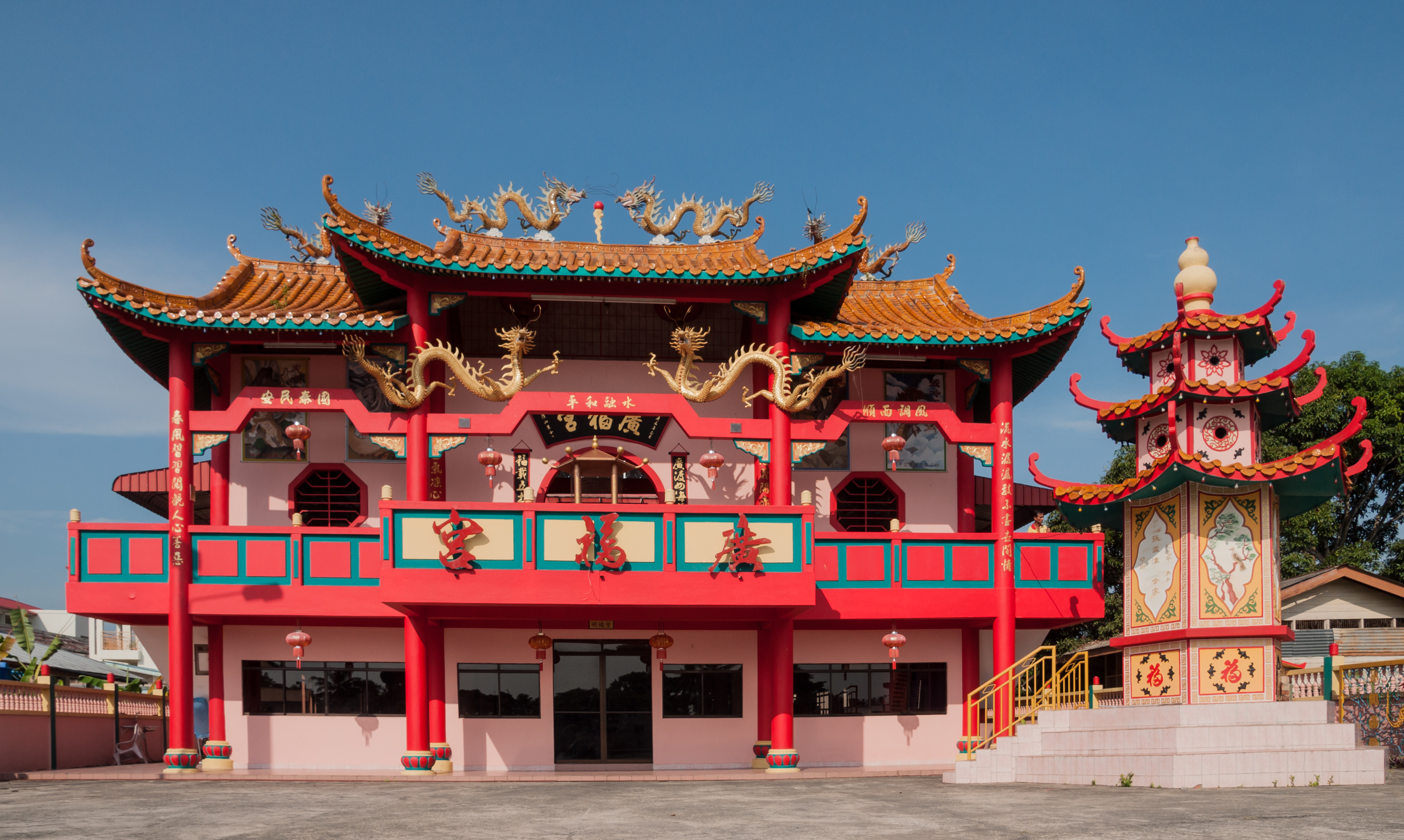
Kwong Fook Kung Temple.
