= Beaufort railway station (Sabah) =

Railway station in Beaufort, Malaysia

Beaufort Railway Station Stesen Keretapi Beaufort
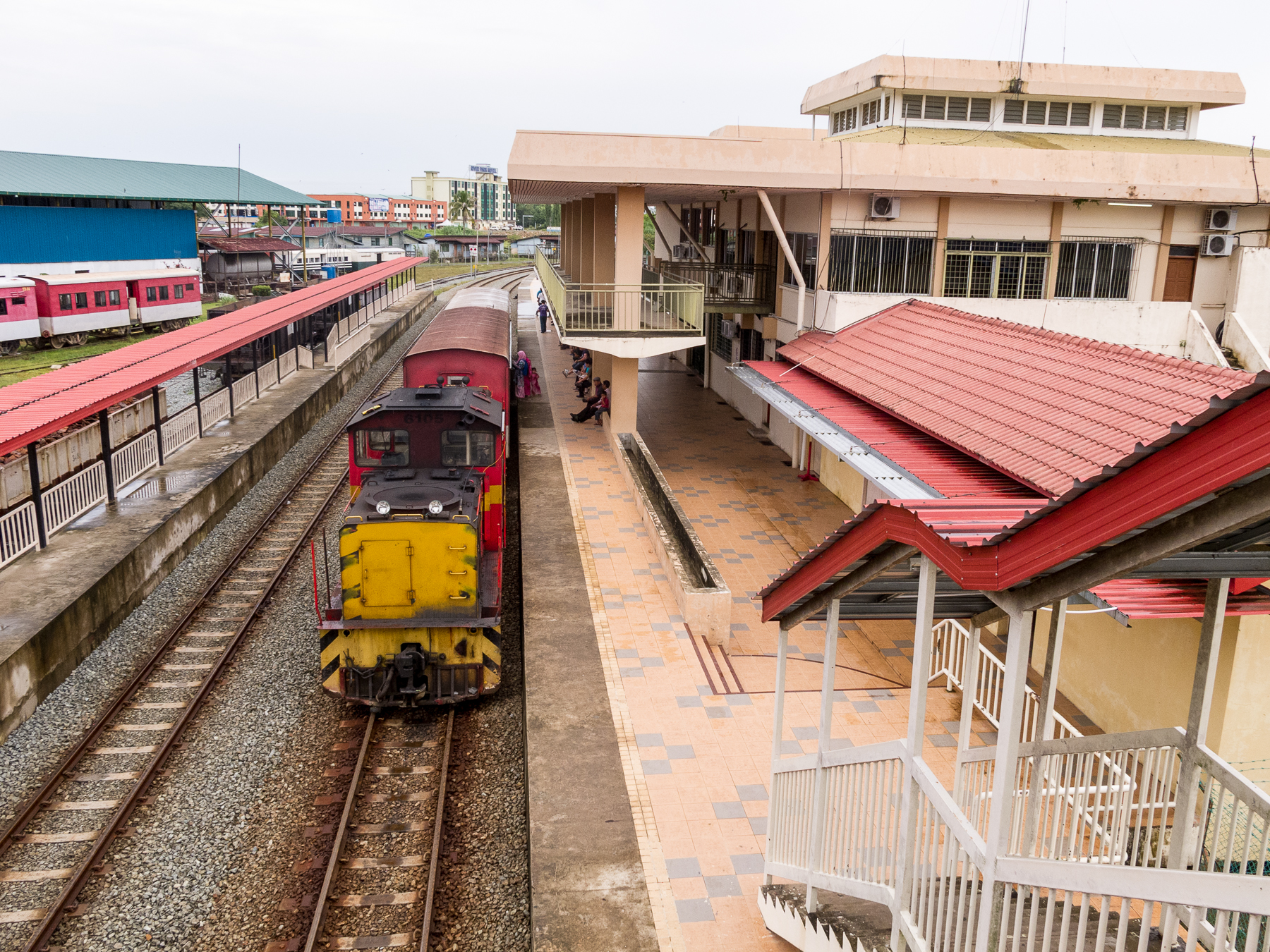
- The station photographed in 2011.

General information
- Location: Beaufort, Sabah; Malaysia
- Coordinates: 5°20′37.93″N 115°44′40.73″E
- Owner: Sabah State Railway
- Operator: Sabah State Railway
- Lines: Western Sabah Railway Line (formerly North Borneo Railway Line)
- Platforms: Side platform
- Tracks: Main line (2)

Construction
- Platform levels: 1
- Parking: Yes
- Cycle facilities: No

History
- Opened: 1 August 1914
- Closed: 2007
- Rebuilt: 21 February 2011

Services
Preceding station	Sabah State Railway	Following station
Saliwangan towards Tenom	Western Line	Membakut towards Secretariat
Location

Beaufort railway station (Malay: Stesen Keretapi Beaufort) is one of four main railway stations on the Western Sabah Railway Line located in Beaufort, Sabah, Malaysia.

== History ==
Railway construction in Beaufort started in 1896; the first construction of a minor station started at the Bakau River on the north east. Another minor station was built on the bank of the Padas River in south Beaufort on 1898. The main station in the town centre (which is the present station) was completed in 1903. Full operation service of the North Borneo Railway started on 1 August 1914.

In 2007, the station was closed for renovation; the original wooden station building was demolished and replaced with a new concrete building. The present station began operation on 21 February 2011. During the 2015 East Malaysian floods, the station was severely flooded. In 2016, a new railbus was introduced, along with new diesel multiple unit (DMUs) from India for use on the Beaufort–Tenom lines.
