= Bongawan =

- Town cum suburb of Papar
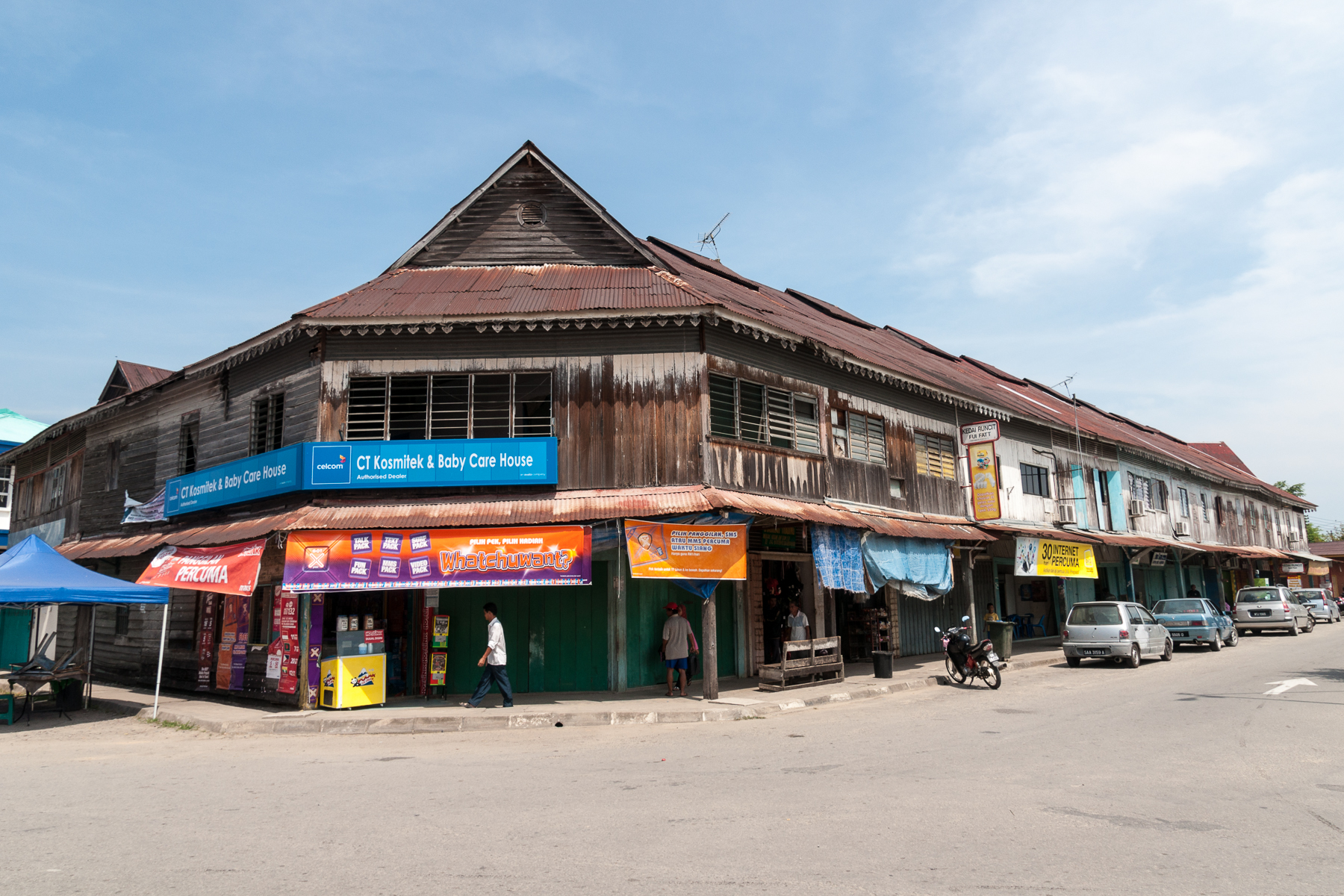
- Pre-World War II shophouses in Bongawan town.
- Etymology: Egrets
- Location of Bongawan Town in Papar District

- Location within Borneo
- Coordinates: 5°32′20″N 115°51′17″E
- Country: Malaysia
- State: Sabah
- Division: West Coast
- District: Papar
- Administration: Papar District Council

Government
  - Body: Papar District Council
  - DUN: Yang Berhormat Dr. Daud Bin Yusof (WARISAN)

Population (2020)
  - Total: 28,731
- Population around Bongawan.
- Time zone: UTC+8 (MST)
- Neighbourhood Area: Kimanis, Papar

Bongawan known as a historical town, is a town located in the Papar District, within the West Coast Division of Sabah, Malaysia, on the island of Borneo. It is situated within the parliamentary constituency of Kimanis. The town center is 3 kilometers inland from the South China Sea and approximately 70 kilometers south of Kota Kinabalu, the state capital. It is located on the A2 highway connecting Kota Kinabalu and the southern part of Sabah, and Bongawan railway station is one of the stops for Sabah State Railway.

Bongawan is noted for its two blocks of wooden shoplots, which were completed in 1939. They are among a few surviving pre-World War II era shophouses surviving in Sabah. Most of the shops are operated by Chinese traders, most of whom belong to the Hakka dialect group.

The town is also noted for the Borneo Golf and Country Club, an 18-hole golf course designed by Jack Nicklaus. The course plays 6546 metres off the championship tees and is spread out over 200 acres (81 ha) on a 900 acres (360 ha) site.

== Education ==
=== Primary schools ===
- SK Viging Ulu
- SK Ulu Lumagar
- SK Sumbiling
- SK Pekan Bongawan
- SK Nyaris-Nyaris
- SK Mandahan
- SJK (C) Bong Hwa

=== Secondary school ===
- SMK Bongawan

== Etymology ==
The name Bongawan comes from the Malay word Bangau, which means 'egrets'. These birds are commonly seen in the paddy fields surrounding the town.
