= Membakut District =

Membakut Daerah Membakut
- District
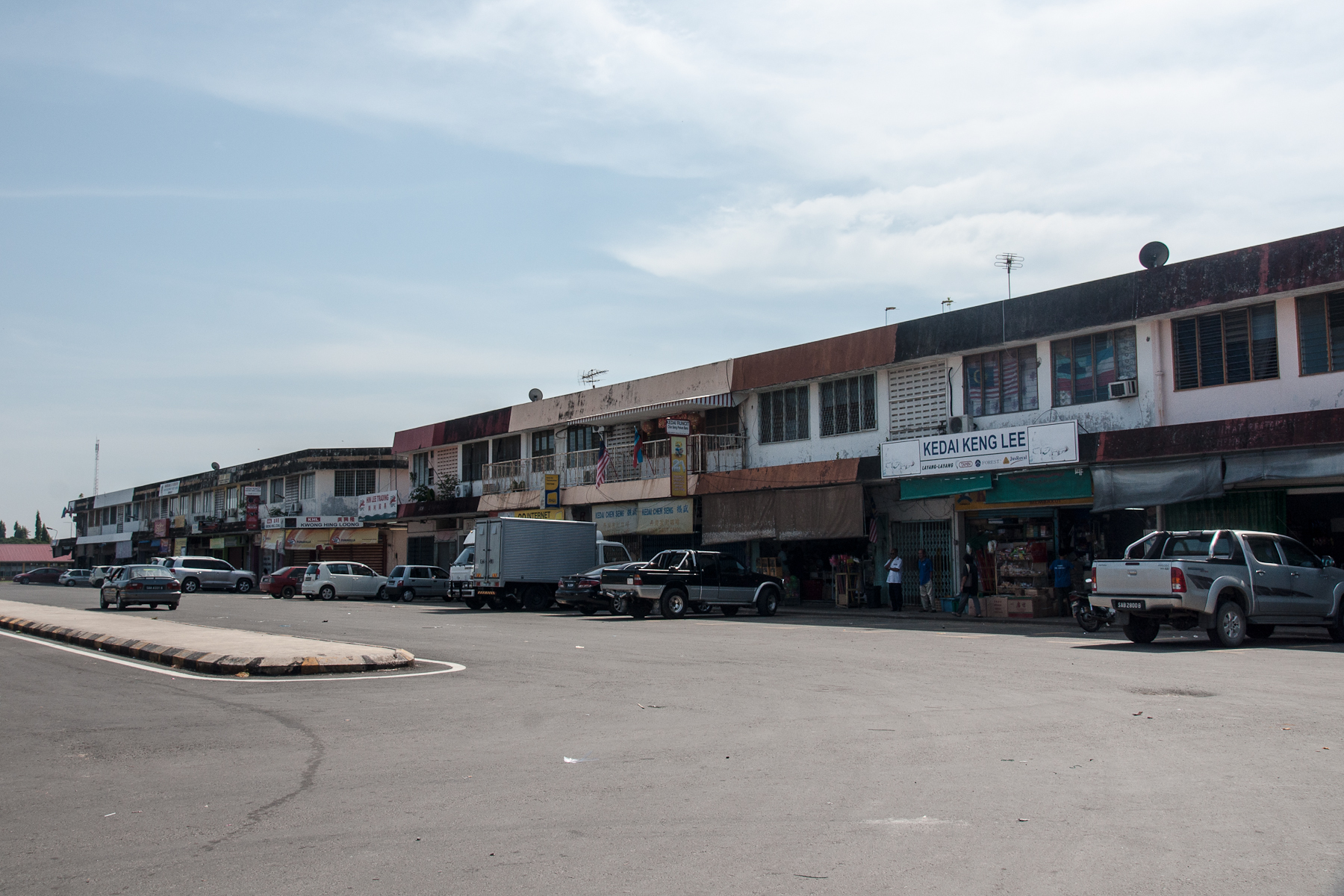

- Location within Borneo
- Coordinates: 5°28′0″N 115°47′0″E
- Country: Malaysia
- State: Sabah

Area
  - Total: 1,480 km^{2} (570 sq mi)

Population (2023)
  - Total: 43,842
  - Density: 29.6/km^{2} (76.7/sq mi)
- Website: pdmembakut.sbh.gov.my

Membakut District (Malay: Daerah Membakut, Dusun: Pogun Membakut) is an administrative district in the Malaysian state of Sabah, part of the Interior Division. The Membakut railway station is a stop for Sabah State Railway.

== The Origin ==
The Origin of Membakut District, Membakut comes from the word "Bakut" which means town. "Mem" is a colloquial word when combined with "Membakut" meaning making a town. Membakut was originally the name of a village occupied by the Brunei tribe and the Dusun tribe located on the banks of a river about 5km from the coast (sea), now the village is called Kg. Brunei. Membakut was made the name of a town to replace its original name "Bua". This idea was the result of the Community Leader, the late OKK Hj. Saman Bin Md. Yaakub. Membakut Subdistrict was initially explored in 1898. This town was previously subject to the British North Borneo Government Administration.

== History ==
It was once called Pekan Kecil Membakut (English: Small Town of Membakut). It was declared a Small District in 1977, under the administration of the Beaufort District. The office building of the Small District of Membakut was completed in 1978.

In October 2023, Membakut became a full district (daerah penuh) of Sabah, East Malaysia. The Membakut District launching ceremony was held on 14 October 2023. As a full district, its area grew from 132.8 square km to 1,480 square km. Membakut District covers the Lumat area up to Kayau.

== Notables ==
- Mohd Arifin Mohd Arif (The Divisional local leader of Membakut, one of GRS founding members, and former State Minister of Special Tasks, born 1963)

== Constituency & Administration ==
- Membakut Sabah Constituency

- Constituency was created in 2004 and according to the gazette issued on 31 October 2022, the Membakut constituency has a total of 9 polling districts. The Inaugural holder for the Membakut SLA Member (Local leader) is Mohd Arifin Mohd Arif.

== Geography ==
Membakut District lies along the western coast of Sabah. It shares border with Beaufort from the southwest, Papar from the northeast, and Kuala Penyu from the west. The landscape transitions from flat, low-lying coastal plains facing the South China Sea to elevated, undulating terrain inland, bounded by the Crocker Range.
