= Tenom =

Tenom Pekan Tenom
- Town and district capital
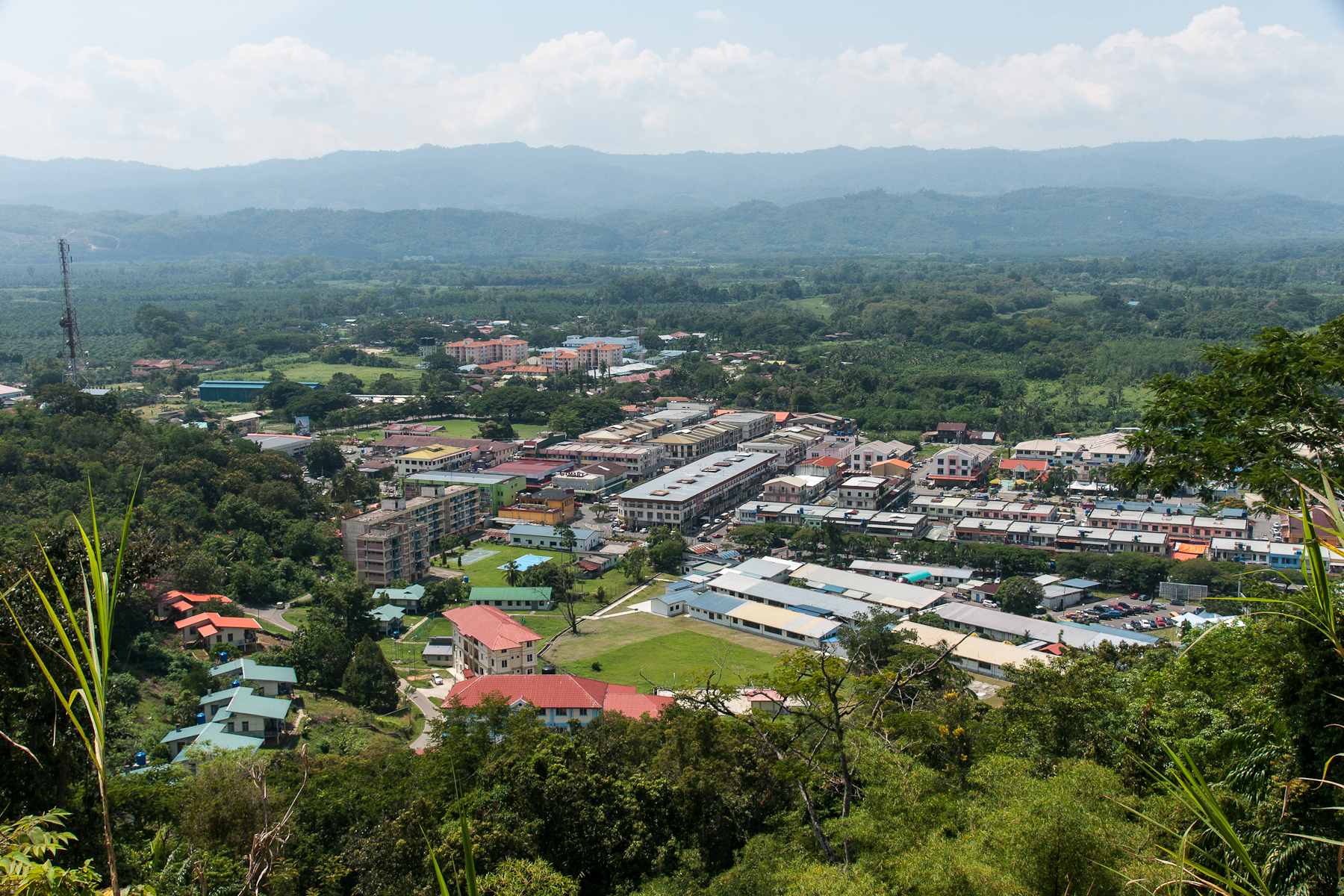
- Tenom town centre.

- Location of Tenom Town in Tenom District

- Location within Borneo
- Coordinates: 5°08′00″N 115°57′00″E
- Country: Malaysia
- State: Sabah
- Division: Interior
- Administration: Tenom District Council

Government
  - Body: Tenom District Council
  - District Officer: Mas Syazwan bin Masood
  - Executive Officer: Hj Mohd Saidi Hj Mohd Ibrahim
  - MP: Yang Berhormat Tuan Riduan Rubin

Population (2020)
  - Total: 48,026
- Postal code: 899XX
- Area code: 087
- Neighborhood Area: Keningau, Kemabong, Melalap
- Website: mdtenom.sabah.gov.my/index.html pdtenom.sabah.gov.my

Tenom (Malay: Pekan Tenom, Malay pronunciation: [te.nom]) is the capital of the Tenom District in the Interior Division of Sabah, Malaysia. It is located about 176 kilometres south of Kota Kinabalu and 128 kilometres north of Long Pasia, which is one of the famous attractions in Sabah. Tenom is also famous for its Tenom Coffee, which is a landmark of the town. Its population was estimated to be around 48,026 in 2020. In the early days of British colonial rule in Malaysia, the town was called Fort Birch. The town is considered the unofficial capital of the Murut community, whose most important festival, the annual Pesta Kalimaran (Kalimaran Festival), is held in the town. It is also the main gateway to other areas within the Murut heartland and the minority of Lundayeh.

== Economy ==
=== Agriculture ===
The fertile land in Tenom and its surrounding area has made it primarily an agricultural area. The main agriculture sources in the area are rubber while soy beans, maize, vegetables, cocoa and coffee became the second contributor to the Tenom economy.

=== Coffee ===
Tenom coffee is a popular type of kopi, a Malay term for coffee beverage made from beans grown in Tenom. Among the main and largest producer of Tenom coffee is the Yit Foh Tenom Coffee, Tong Fah Coffee Factory and Fatt Choi Tenom Coffee.

Tenom coffee is made from Robusta variety. The coffee bean was processed using traditional firewood and drum rotation methods followed for almost 50 years without adding any artificial ingredients or colourings.

==== History coffee ====
Originally, coffee started to be planted in Sabah during the administration of British North Borneo, but only focused in the area of the east coast on the forest reserve near mangrove areas. However, due to an outbreak of disease, it was abandoned in 1910. Since then, coffee production was concentrated in the west coast area. Tenom received attention when the British North Borneo Chartered Company (BNBCC) established coffee and other plantations in the area. To take the resources to major towns, a railway line from Melalap to Jesselton (now Kota Kinabalu) was built by the British in the late 1890s. To increase the coffee production, many labourers from China, mainly those of Hakka and Cantonese descent, were brought to Tenom by the British as local workforce. Today, Tenom is widely known as an agriculture site with large coffee production and has been dubbed as the "Sabah's coffee capital". Together with cocoa, rice field and fruit crops, coffee is the second largest contributor to the Tenom agriculture economy after rubber. Due to its large demand from other countries since 2010s, the government began to help to address the shortage of raw coffee supply in Tenom.

=== Tourism ===
Among the primary tourist attractions in the district are the Sabah Agricultural Park (Lagud Seberang Agriculture Research Station), the Tenom Orchid Centre and the Murut Cultural Centre. The town is also known in the tourism industry for whitewater rafting on the Padas River and the coffee factory. Tenom railway station is the final stop of the Sabah State Railway, which originates from Tanjung Aru.

== Gallery ==
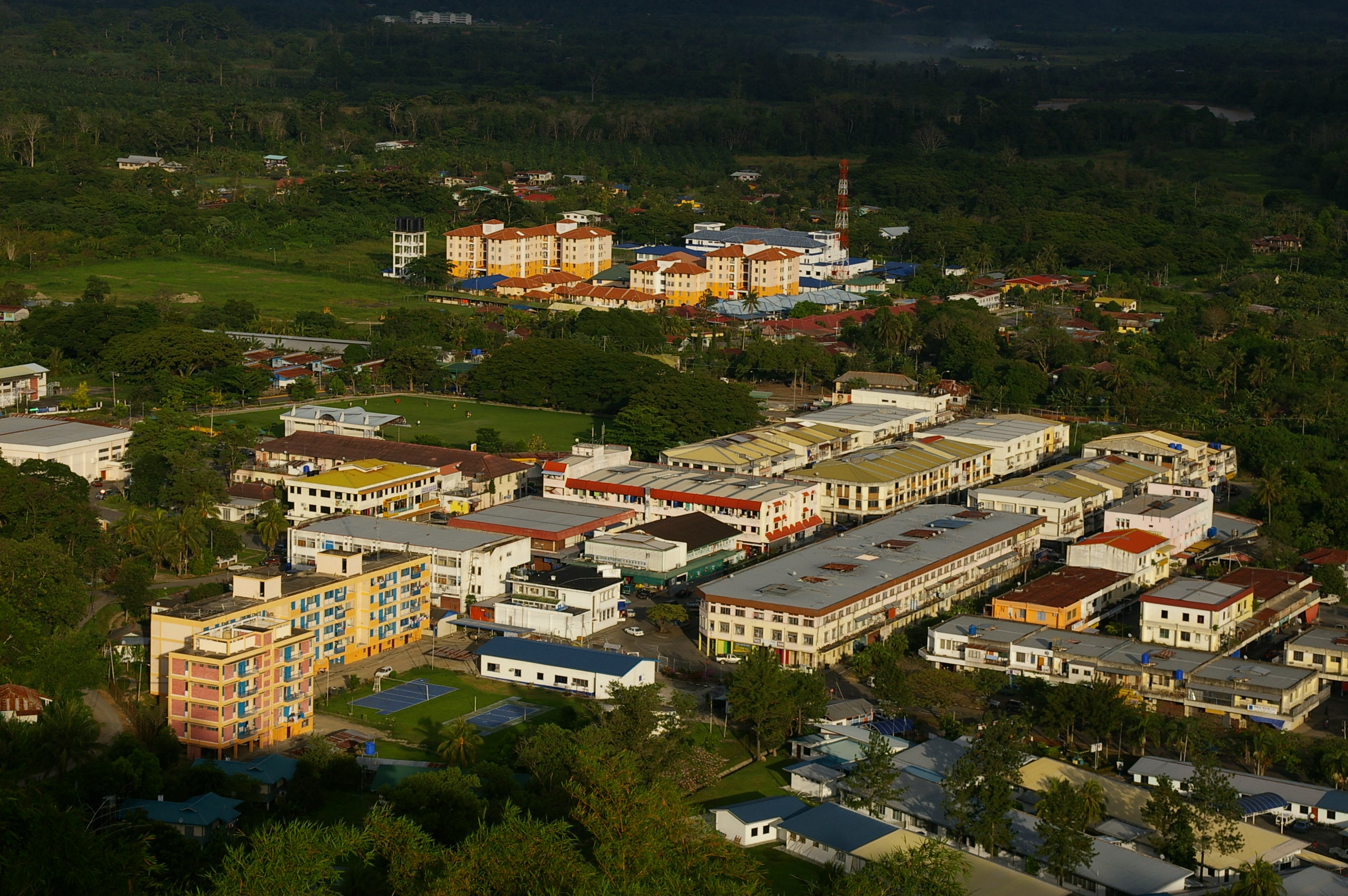
Panorama of Tenom in 2006.

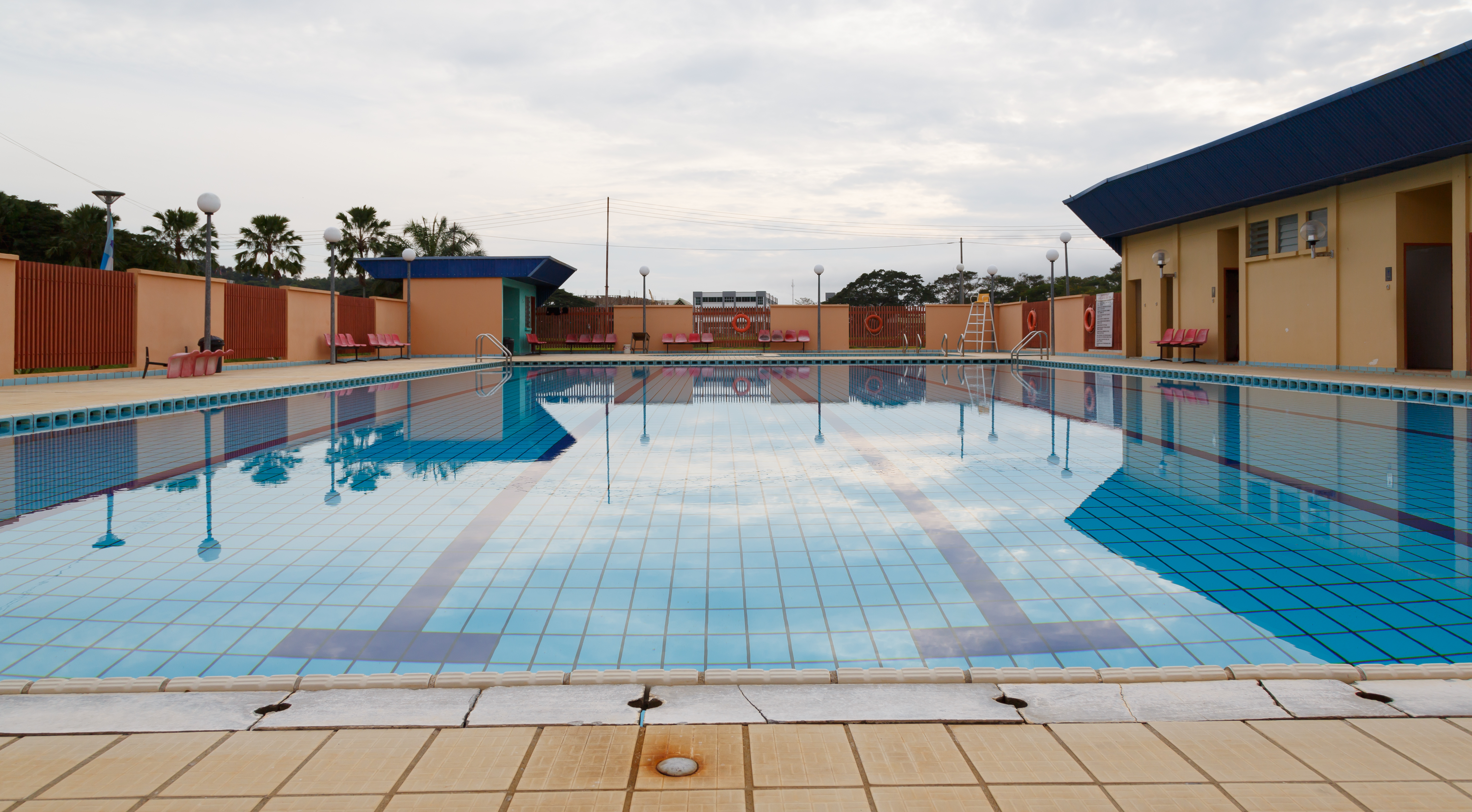
A swimming pool in Tenom.

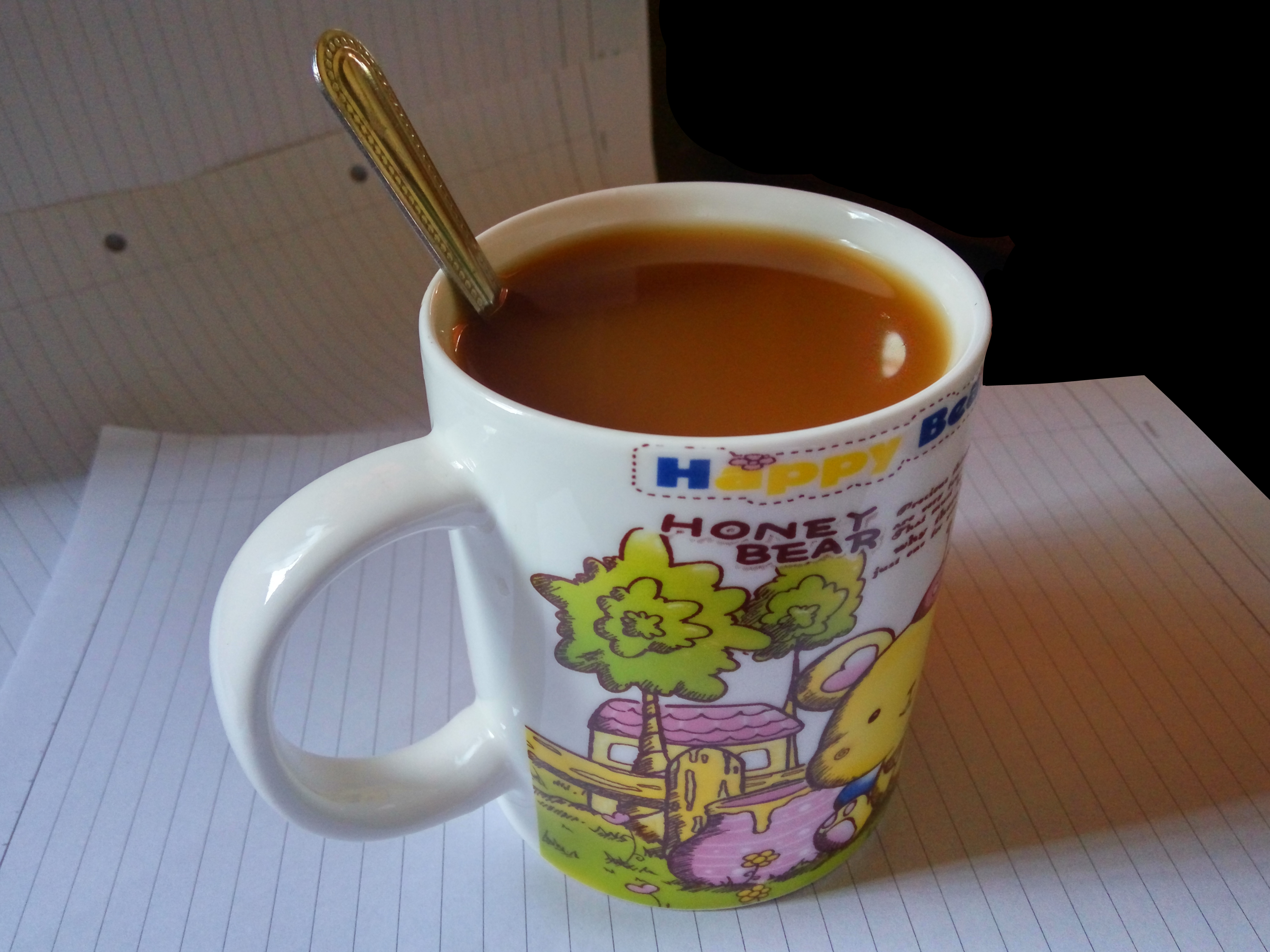
A mug of kopi made from Tenom coffee beans.

== See also ==
- Ipoh white coffee
- List of coffee drinks
