= Tenom railway station =

Railway station in Tenom, Malaysia

Tenom Railway Station Stesen Keretapi Tenom
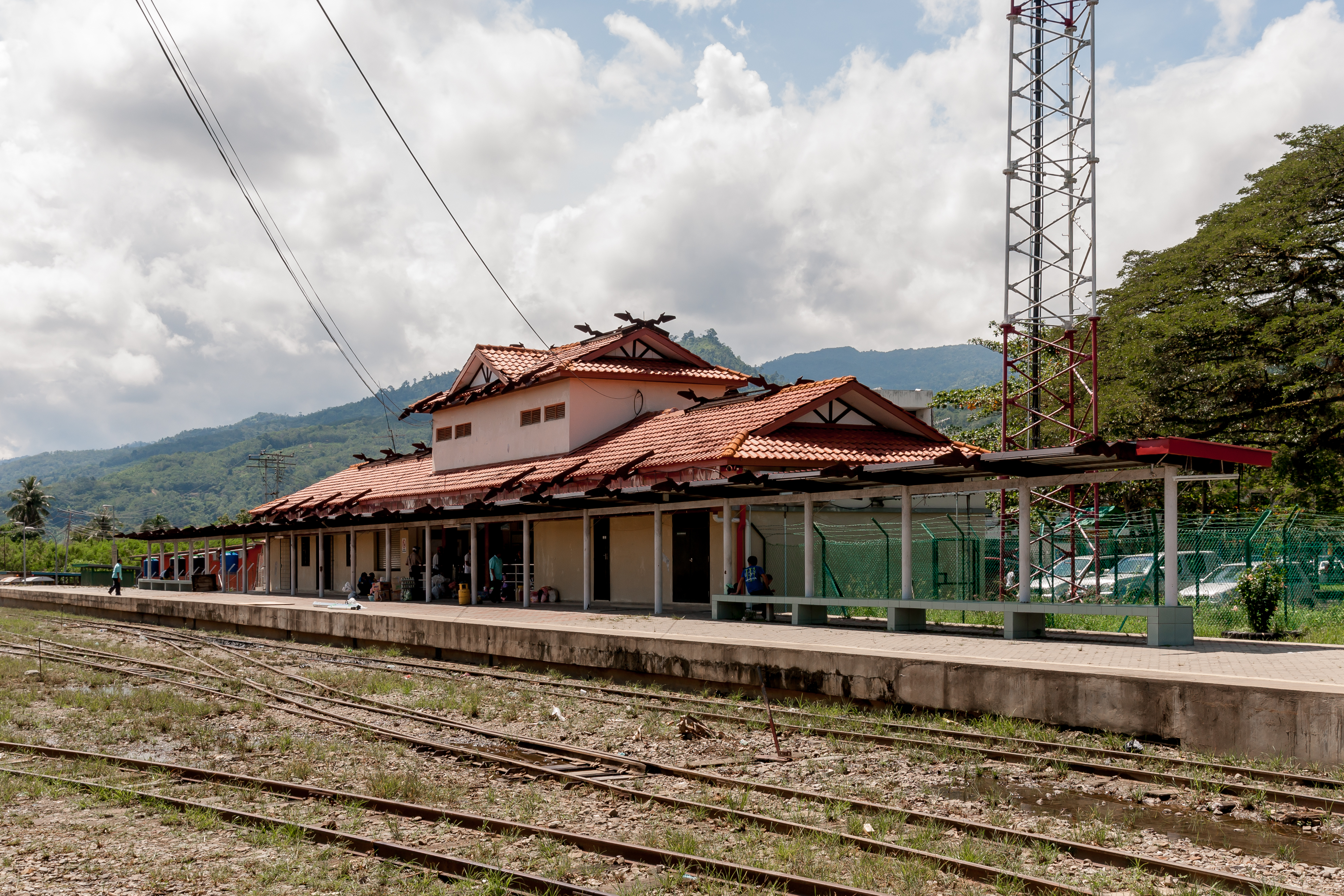
- The station photographed in 2018.

General information
- Location: Tenom, Sabah; Malaysia
- Coordinates: 5°7′23.17″N 115°56′41.96″E
- Owner: Sabah State Railway
- Operator: Sabah State Railway
- Lines: Western Sabah Railway Line (formerly North Borneo Railway Line)
- Platforms: Side platform
- Tracks: Main line (2)

Construction
- Platform levels: 1
- Parking: Yes
- Cycle facilities: No

History
- Opened: 1 August 1914
- Closed: 2007
- Rebuilt: 21 February 2011

Services
Preceding station	Sabah State Railway	Following station
Terminus	Western Line	Pangi towards Secretariat
Location

Tenom railway station (Malay: Stesen Keretapi Tenom) is one of four main railway station on the Western Sabah Railway Line located in Tenom, Sabah, Malaysia.

== History ==
Like most areas in the West Coast Division; the area around Tenom in the Interior Division is used by the North Borneo administration for agricultural purposes. To transport the produce to major towns, English engineer Arthur J. West import labourers from China to construct a railway line in 1903 in Tenom; which was later completed in 1905. The original station was built from wood and located in (5°7′25″N 115°56′43″E) before it was moved to the present site in 2007 with the construction of a new station following the modernisation of rail services in the modern state of Sabah. From 1970s, the line to Melalap that connecting to the station have been dismantled. The present station began its operation on 21 February 2011. In 2016, new diesel multiple unit (DMUs) from India for use in the Beaufort–Tenom lines was introduced.

=== Track upgrade ===
On 19 November 2021, Malaysia's Deputy Transport Minister Henry Sum Agong announced the project to upgrade the Halogilat-Tenom railway track is expected to be ready by early 2022.
