= Sembulan railway station =

Railway station in Malaysia

Sembulan Railway Station Stesen Keretapi Sembulan
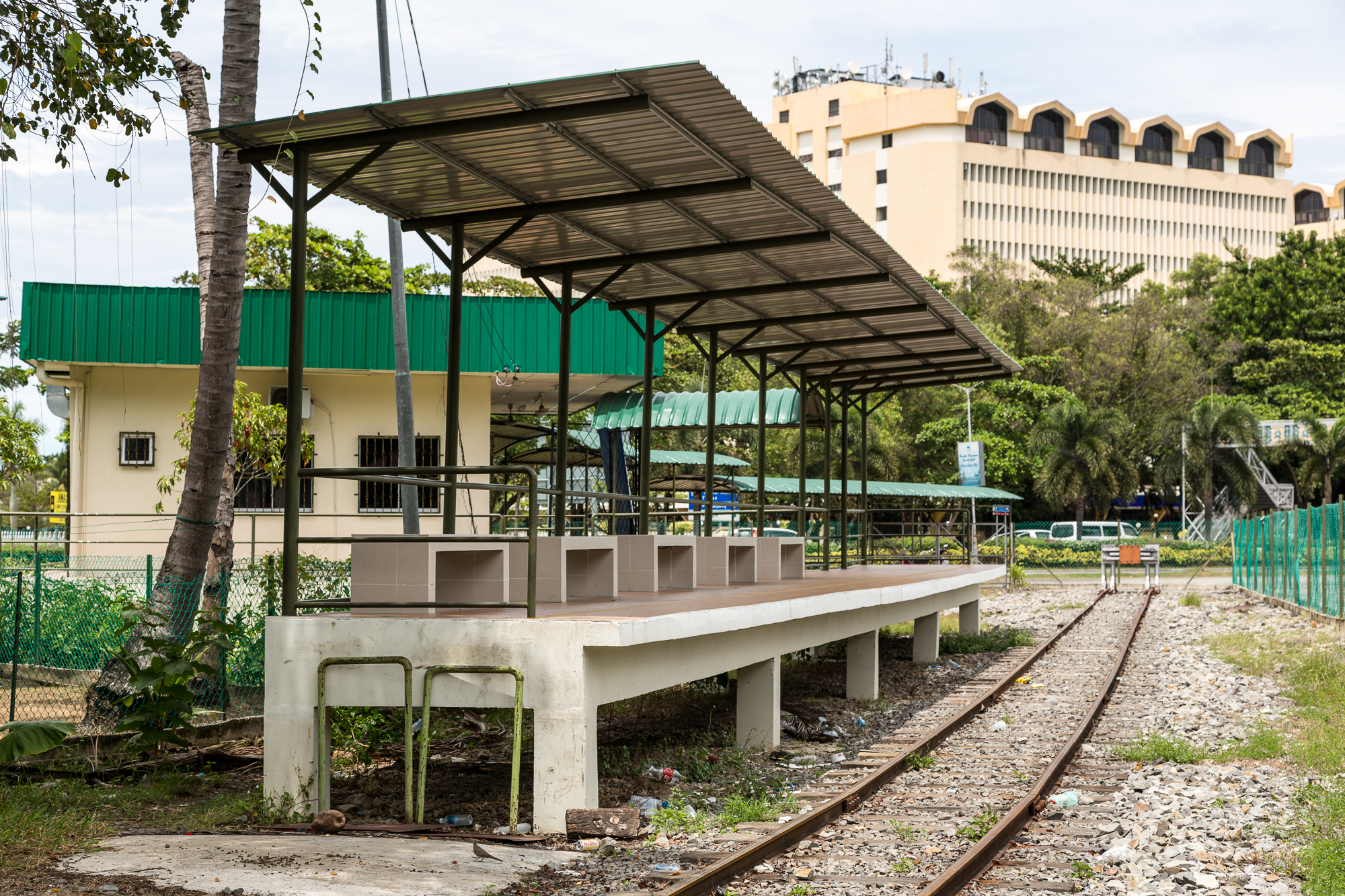
- The station photographed in 2012.

General information
- Location: Secretariat Building, Kota Kinabalu, Sabah; Malaysia
- Coordinates: 5°57′31.92″N 116°4′6.65″E
- Owner: Sabah State Railway
- Operator: Sabah State Railway
- Lines: Western Sabah Railway Line (formerly North Borneo Railway Line)
- Platforms: Side platform
- Tracks: Main line (2)

Construction
- Platform levels: 1
- Parking: Yes
- Cycle facilities: No

History
- Opened: 1 August 1914
- Closed: 2007
- Rebuilt: 2012

Services
Preceding station	Sabah State Railway	Following station
Tanjung Aru towards Tenom	Western Line	Terminus
Location

Sembulan railway station (Malay: Stesen Keretapi Sembulan), formerly Secretariat railway station, is one of eleven minor railway station on the Western Sabah Railway Line located in Secretariat Building, Kota Kinabalu, Sabah, Malaysia. The station was renovated in 2012 and known as the last station towards the city centre.
