= Western Sabah Railway Line =

Railway line in Malaysia

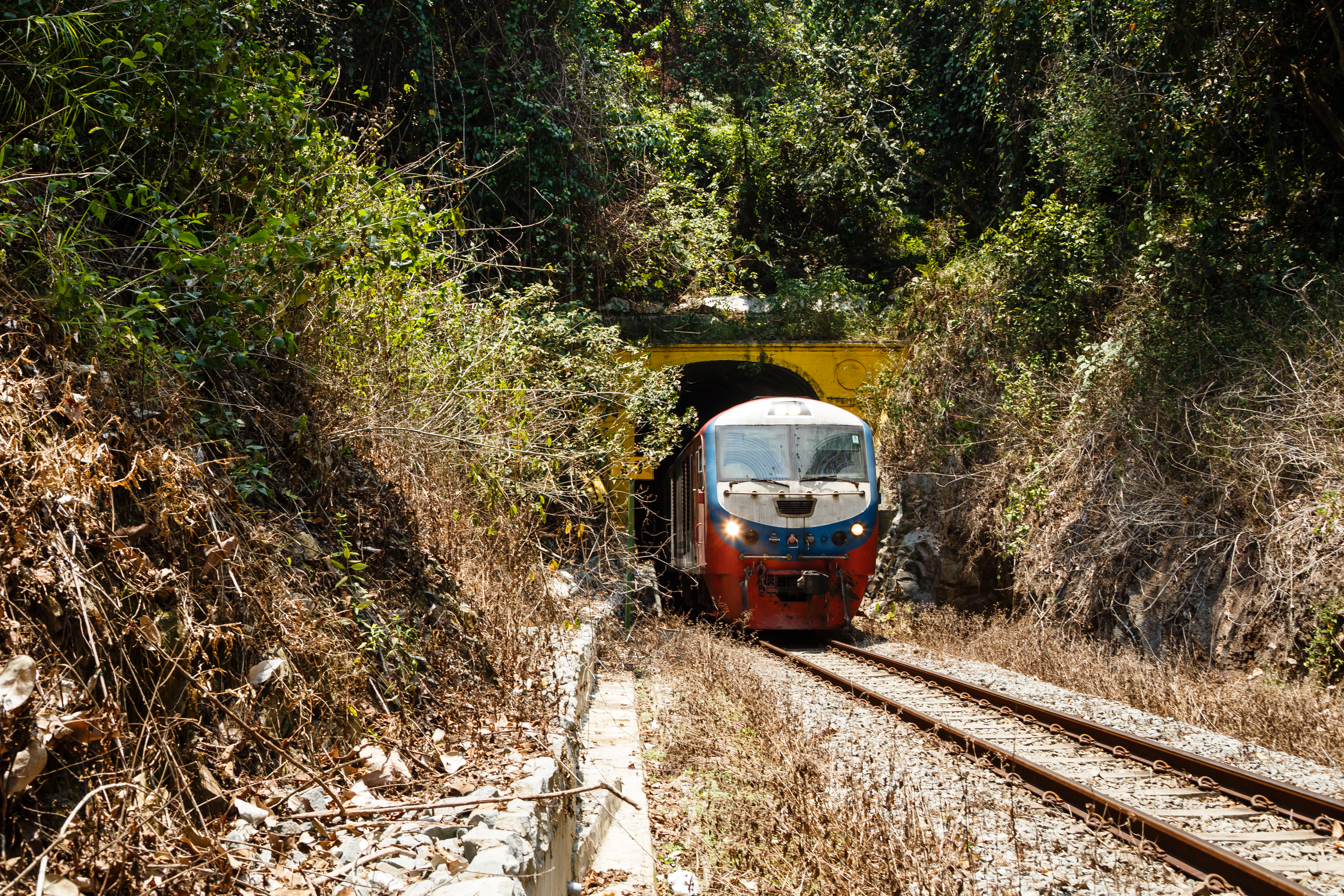
- A train passing the Pengalat Railway Tunnel between Kawang and Papar. View from Kawang side.

Overview
- Native name: Laluan Keretapi Barat Sabah
- Owner: Government of Sabah
- Locale: Sabah
- Termini: Tanjung Aru; Tenom
- Stations: 15

Service
- Type: Regional rail
- Operator(s): Sabah State Railway

Technical
- Line length: 134 km (83 mi)
- Number of tracks: 1
- Track gauge: 1,000 mm (3 ft 3 3/8 in) metre gauge

The Western Sabah Railway Line (Malay: Laluan Keretapi Barat Sabah) in Sabah, Malaysia is the name given to rail services that operate from Tanjung Aru until Tenom in the West Coast and Interior divisions under the management of Sabah State Railway. The line previously known as North Borneo Railway Line.

== History ==
Following the large demands of tobacco prior to the industry success in 1880, there was a great demand for lands for the tobacco plantation. The process to transport the produce was hardened due to lack of transportation. In 1894, following the appointment of a director and managing director for the North Borneo Chartered Company; the involvement of William Clark Cowie become crucial for the establishment of railway systems in North Borneo. Already in the early months of his involvement, Cowie had commenced work on telegraph line and the railway; with a vision to connect the east and west areas of North Borneo through the forests, mountain ranges, rivers and swampland. An English civil engineer, Arthur Joseph West was then appointed to establish the railway line from Bukau in the north of Beaufort and south to Weston. At the same time a ferry service have been established between Beaufort North to Beaufort South to carry passengers and cargo across the Padas River.

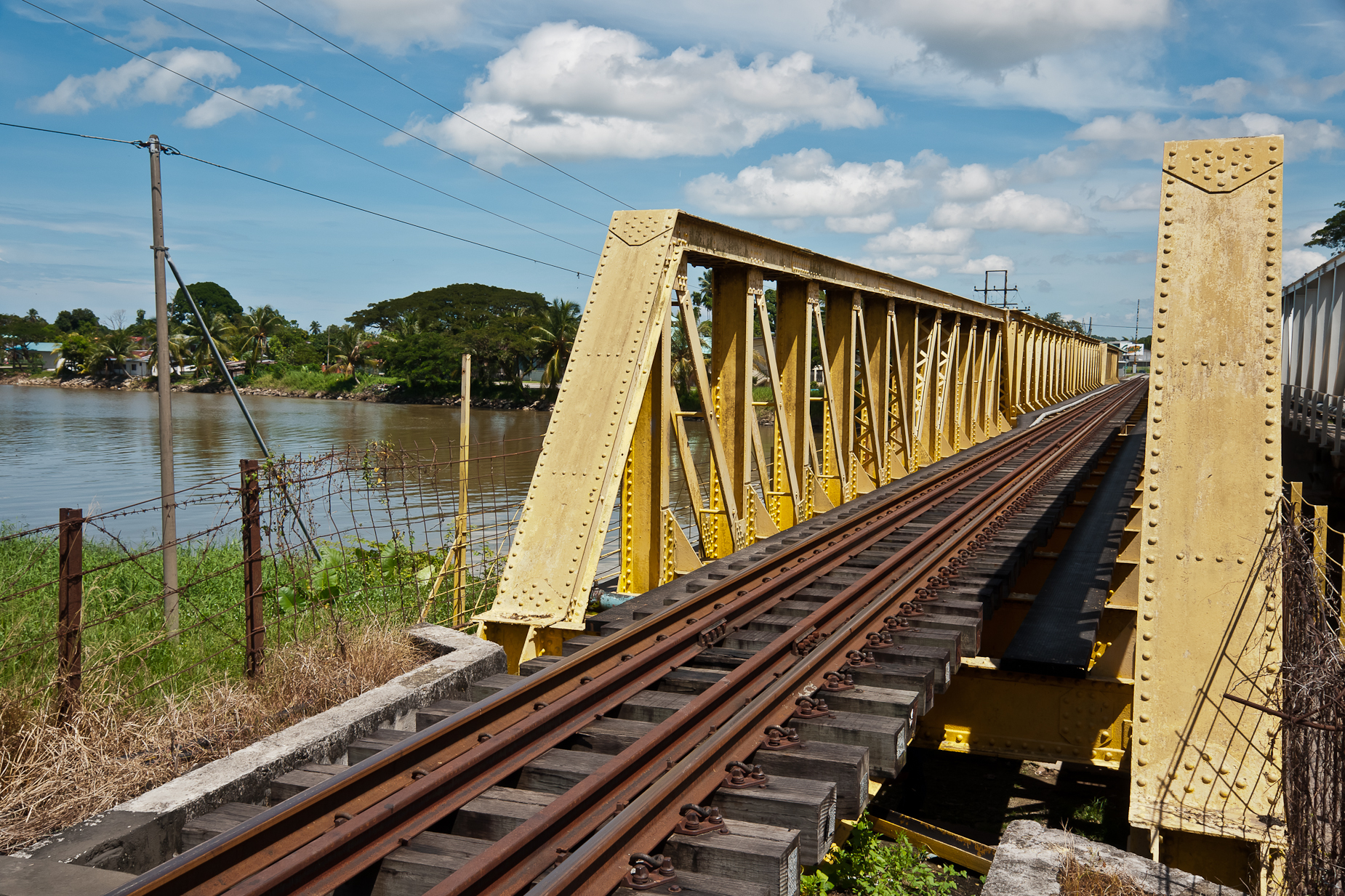
Papar railway bridge.

A new port in Brunei Bay was established under the name of West. It was only discovered soon in 1890 after the completion of railway lines there that the area in Weston are too shallow to be made for a deep-sea wharf; resulting to his ambition to link the whole areas of North Borneo only an ambition. The plan was also met with financial problems as the construction required a large sum of money to be wholly financed by the company and majority of the officials did not show a real enthusiasm over the plan. Cowie however persisted and raised a further £200,000 in 1901 through the issue of debenture stock. The next year, the company rejected further request from Cowie's to borrow £500,000 more as the plan would cause them bankruptcy. This result the line only managed to be finished until Melalap as Cowie's plan could proceed no further.

=== Modernisation ===
Following the end of British rule in North Borneo, the railway management then came under the Sabah State Railway after the territory become part of Malaysia. To rejuvenate the line, the state government hired Suria Capital Holdings Bhd and Hikmat Asia to revamp the whole line at a cost of RM300 million ($594 million); with the largest concession goes to S P Setia with the firm began work on the vast Aeropod project to modernise the main railway station in Tanjung Aru that will be equipped with apartments, office towers, mall and a hotel.

On 23 February 2019, Sabah Industrial Development Minister Peter Anthony said the Tenom-Melalap rail service in western Sabah will be revived with Chief Minister Shafie Apdal will officiate the starting of the construction on 31 March. The ground breaking ceremony was moved to 1 April instead which also involving the establishment of Melalap town. Around RM10 million has been allocated by the state government for the 15 kilometres railway line connecting Melalap with Tenom town. Through the meeting of the Sabah State Legislative Assembly on 16 April, Minister Anthony further told that another line with a length of 175 kilometres that will connecting Kudat with Kota Kinabalu are under preliminary study stage which expected to be ready in the end of the year. Nevertheless with the change of the state government administration, new Sabah Deputy Chief Minister Bung Mokhtar Radin explained in late 2021 that the proposed railway track connecting Tenom and Melalap that was alleged to cost for RM50 million to implement had been cancelled and replaced with the procurement of one locomotive, six units of diesel multiple unit (DMU), semi automated tamping machine, composite sleepers and shuttle bus, which are claimed will boost efficiency, safety and consistency of the state railway department to benefit more train commuters in the state while the new proposed railway track to Kudat are still studied with the study to be implement in 2022.

On 19 November 2021, Malaysia's Deputy Transport Minister Henry Sum Agong announced that another project to upgrade the Halogilat-Tenom railway track in Sabah is expected to be ready by early 2022.

=== Further connection with Sarawak ===
On 15 October 2021, Sarawak Senator Robert Lau Hui Yew made a proposal during a parliament session in Dewan Negara for a railway track to be constructed in Sarawak to link the cities of Kuching, Sibu, Bintulu and Miri with Sabah's capital of Kota Kinabalu.

== See also ==
- North Eastern Sabah Railway Line
- Rail transport in Malaysia
