= List of schools in Sabah =

This is a list of schools in Sabah, Malaysia. Schools are categorised according to their types and education districts (for schools which do not fall under the direct rule of Ministry of Education) and is arranged alphabetically in Malay language. Note that only some notable schools are abbreviated.

For the purpose of this list:

- KV stands for Kolej Vokasional (vocational college);
- SJK (C) stands for Sekolah Jenis Kebangsaan Cina (Chinese type primary school);
- SK stands for Sekolah Kebangsaan (primary school);
- SM(K) stands for Sekolah Menengah (Kebangsaan) (secondary school);
- SMJK stands for Sekolah Menengah Jenis Kebangsaan (secondary school)
- SMKA stands for Sekolah Menengah Kebangsaan Agama (Islamic secondary school).
- SRS stands for Sekolah Rendah Swasta (private primary school)

== Specific schools ==
=== Chinese independent schools ===
Division	City/Town	School
Interior Division	Tenom	Tenom Tshung Tsin Secondary School
Kudat Division	Kudat	Pei Tsin High School
Sandakan Division	Sandakan	Yu Yuan Secondary School
Tawau Division	Tawau	Sabah Chinese High School
West Coast Division	Kota Kinabalu	Kian Kok Middle School
West Coast Division	Kota Kinabalu	Sabah Tshung Tsin Secondary School
West Coast Division	Papar	Papar Middle School Malaysia

=== Fully residential schools ===
Division	City/Town	School
Tawau Division	Lahad Datu	SM Sains Lahad Datu (SEMSALD)
West Coast Division	Tuaran	SM Sains Sabah (SMESH)

=== Islamic secondary schools ===
Division	City/Town	School
Interior Division	Keningau	SMKA Keningau (SEMAKEN)
Tawau Division	Semporna	SMKA Tun Sakaran (SMATS Semporna)
Tawau Division	Tawau	SMU Islamiah (SMIT)
West Coast Division
West Coast Division	Kota Belud	SMKA Tun Said (SMATS KB)
West Coast Division	Kota Kinabalu	SMKA Kota Kinabalu (SMKAKK)
West Coast Division	Kota Kinabalu	SMKA Tun Ahmadshah (SMKA TUNAS)
West Coast Division	Papar	SMKA Limauan (SMALNIS)
West Coast Division	Papar	SMKA Tun Datu Mustapha (SMKA TDM)
West Coast Division	Ranau	SM Agama al-Irsyadiah Marakau (SMAIM)
West Coast Division	Ranau	SMKA Mohamad Ali
West Coast Division	Sandakan	SMKA Tun Juhar (SMATJU)

=== SDA Mission schools ===
Division	City/Town	School
Kudat Division	Kota Marudu	SRA Bambangan
Kudat Division	Kota Marudu	SRA Damai
Kudat Division	Kota Marudu	SMA Goshen (GASS)
Kudat Division	Kota Marudu	SRA Goshen
Kudat Division	Kota Marudu	SRA Sungoi
Kudat Division	Kota Marudu	SRA Tagaroh
Kudat Division	Kota Marudu	SRA Tambuluran
Kudat Division	Kudat	SRA Marabau
West Coast Division	Kota Belud	SRA Gaur
West Coast Division	Kota Belud	SRA Kelawat
West Coast Division	Kota Belud	SRA Rangalau
West Coast Division	Tamparuli	SMA Tamparuli (SASS)
West Coast Division	Tuaran	SRA Tenghilan

=== Private schools ===
Division	City/Town	School
West Coast Division	Kota Kinabalu	Seri Insan Borneo School
West Coast Division	Kota Kinabalu	Yuet Ching Private School
West Coast Division	Likas	Maktab Nasional (MN)
West Coast Division	Likas	SRS Datuk Simon Fung (SRSDSF)

=== International Schools ===
Division	City/Town	School
Tawau Division	Tawau	Charis International School
Tawau Division	Tawau	Vision International School
West Coast Division	Kota Kinabalu	Jesselton International School
West Coast Division	Kota Kinabalu	Kinabalu International School

=== Technical and vocational colleges ===
Division	City/Town	School
Interior Division	Beaufort	KV Beaufort
Interior Division	Keningau	KV Keningau
Interior Division	Keningau	KV Keningau 2
Kudat Division	Kudat	KV Kudat
Sandakan Division	Sandakan	KV Sandakan
Tawau Division	Lahad Datu	KV Lahad Datu
Tawau Division	Tawau	KV Tawau
West Coast Division	Kota Kinabalu	KV Likas

=== Special education schools ===
Division	City/Town	School
West Coast Division	Putatan	SK Pendidikan Khas Tuaran
West Coast Division	Tuaran	SK Pendidikan Khas Kota Kinabalu

=== Sport schools ===
Division	City/Town	School
West Coast Division	Kota Kinabalu	Sekolah Sukan Malaysia Sabah

== Public schools ==
=== Secondary education: Sekolah Menengah Kebangsaan (SMK) ===
School code	School name	Postcode	Area	Coordinates
XFE3002	SMK Abaka	91027	Tawau	4.3309°N 117.8413°E
XEA5026	SMK Abd. Rahim II	89058	Kudat	6.9115°N 116.8412°E
XEE5019	SMK Abdul Rahim	89057	Kudat	6.8982°N 116.8481°E
XEE3117	SMK Agaseh	91112	Lahad Datu	5.0367°N 118.3464°E
XFE4001	SM All Saints	88805	Kota Kinabalu	5.9909°N 116.1074°E
XEA1057	SMK Apin-Apin	89008	Keningau	5.4491°N 116.2479°E
XEE5318	SMK Arshad	89157	Kota Belud	6.3432°N 116.4256°E
XEE4374	SMK Badin	89208	Tuaran	6.1766°N 116.2271°E
XEA4128	SMK Bahang	89507	Penampang	5.9243°N 116.0886°E
XEA2145	SMK Balaban Jaya	90108	Beluran	5.8200°N 117.6084°E
XEA3053	SMK Balung	91010	Tawau	4.3633°N 118.0988°E
XEE4032	SMK Bandaraya Kota Kinabalu	88450	Kota Kinabalu	6.0454°N 116.1521°E
XEA5103	SMK Bandau	89108	Kota Marudu	6.4956°N 116.8264°E
XEA5021	SMK Banggi	89058	Kudat	7.1319°N 117.0728°E
XEA2072	SMK Batu Sapi	90719	Sandakan	5.8139°N 118.0629°E
XEA6065	SMK Beaufort	89808	Beaufort	5.3541°N 115.7315°E
XEA6066	SMK Beaufort II	89809	Beaufort	5.3570°N 115.7297°E
XEA6067	SMK Beaufort III	89808	Beaufort	5.3391°N 115.7270°E
XEE2103	SMK Beluran	90107	Beluran	5.8888°N 117.5558°E
XEA2147	SMK Beluran II	90107	Beluran	5.8879°N 117.5867°E
XEA5102	SMK Bengkongan	89108	Kota Marudu	6.5831°N 116.7174°E
XEA4262	SMK Benoni	89608	Papar	5.6879°N 115.9335°E
XEE1008	SMK Bingkor	89007	Keningau	5.4032°N 116.1880°E
XEE6102	SMK Bongawan	89700	Bongawan	5.5381°N 115.8506°E
XEA4264	SMK Bongawan II	89700	Bongawan	5.5992°N 115.8887°E
XEA5220	SMK Bongkol	89100	Pitas	6.8279°N 117.1641°E
XEA3329	SMK Bugaya	91309	Semporna	4.4936°N 118.5576°E
XEA3334	SMK Bugaya II	91309	Semporna	4.5081°N 118.5507°E
XEA2220	SMK Bukit Garam	90200	Kinabatangan	5.5952°N 117.8305°E
XEA2227	SMK Bukit Garam II	90200	Sandakan	5.5933°N 117.8357°E
XEA3330	SMK Bum-Bum	91308	Semporna	4.4588°N 118.6701°E
XEA5402	SMK Bundu Tuhan	89308	Ranau	5.9843°N 116.5276°E
XEA1222	SMK Chinta Mata	89909	Tenom	5.0962°N 115.9414°E
XFE1306	SMJK Chung Hwa	89907	Tenom	5.1282°N 115.9466°E
XEA3335	SMK Datuk Haji Panglima Jakarullah	91308	Semporna	4.4474°N 118.5710°E
XEE3318	SMK Datuk Panglima Abdullah	91308	Semporna	4.4551°N 118.5709°E
XEA4127	SMK Datuk Peter Mojuntin	89507	Penampang	5.9067°N 116.0875°E
XEA3105	SMK Desa Kencana	91150	Lahad Datu	5.0803°N 119.0672°E
XEA1221	SMK Desa Wawasan	89657	Tambunan	5.8743°N 116.4966°E
XEA2071	SMK Elopura	90712	Sandakan	5.8851°N 117.9929°E
XEA2083	SMK Elopura Dua	90400	Sandakan	5.8537°N 118.0506°E
XEA1346	SMK Entabuan	89908	Tenom	5.1192°N 115.9773°E
XEA2226	SMK Entilibon	89320	Telupid	5.5296°N 117.0439°E
XEE6011	SMK Gadong	89808	Beaufort	5.3638°N 115.6092°E
XEA2074	SMK Gum-Gum	90000	Sandakan	5.9000°N 117.9130°E
XEE1023	SMK Gunsanad	89007	Keningau	5.3381°N 116.1625°E
XEA1061	SMK Gunsanad II	89008	Keningau	5.3458°N 116.1552°E
XFE3017	SMK Holy Trinity	91019	Tawau	4.2553°N 117.8916°E
XEA4041	SMK Inanam	89357	Inanam	6.0071°N 116.1309°E
XEA3066	SMK Jalan Apas	91022	Tawau	4.2575°N 117.9440°E
XEA3074	SMK Jambatan Putih	91019	Tawau	4.2763°N 117.9250°E
XEA3332	SMK Kabogan	91308	Semporna	4.4204°N 118.6107°E
XEA3333	SMK Kabogan II	91309	Semporna	4.4584°N 118.6035°E
XEA3069	SMK Kalabakan	91034	Tawau	4.4035°N 117.5009°E
XEA5218	SMK Kanibungan	89100	Pitas	6.6523°N 117.2192°E
XEA1345	SMK Kemabong	89908	Tenom	4.9147°N 115.9162°E
XEA5406	SMK Kemburongoh Ranau	89308	Ranau	5.9151°N 116.5549°E
XFE1021	SMJK Ken Hwa	89007	Keningau	5.3530°N 116.1478°E
XEA1058	SMK Keningau	89008	Keningau	5.3103°N 116.1542°E
XEA1059	SMK Keningau II	89008	Keningau	5.3698°N 116.1799°E
XEA3062	SMK Kinabutan	91012	Tawau	4.2551°N 117.9552°E
XEA3075	SMK Kinabutan 2	90101	Tawau	4.2752°N 117.9693°E
XEA4261	SMK Kinarut	89608	Papar	5.8299°N 116.0356°E
XEA4045	SMK Kolombong	89357	Kota Kinabalu	5.9809°N 116.1297°E
XFE2037	SMK Konven St Cecilia	90702	Sandakan	5.8599°N 118.1006°E
XEE6021	SMK Kota Klias	89808	Beaufort	5.4446°N 115.6273°E
XEE5118	SMK Kota Marudu	89107	Kota Marudu	6.4957°N 116.7627°E
XEA5105	SMK Kota Marudu II	89108	Kota Marudu	6.5152°N 116.7835°E
XEE6310	SMK Kuala Penyu	89747	Kuala Penyu	5.5003°N 115.5543°E
XEA5001	SMK Kudat	89058	Kudat	6.8843°N 116.8488°E
XEA5023	SMK Kudat II	89058	Kudat	6.9163°N 116.8434°E
XEE3024	SMK Kuhara	91008	Tawau	4.2788°N 117.8886°E
XEE3201	SMK Kunak	91207	Kunak	4.6798°N 118.2455°E
XEA3201	SMK Kunak Jaya	91207	Kunak	4.6790°N 118.2500°E
XEA5403	SMK Kundasang	89308	Ranau	5.9887°N 116.5771°E
XFE4022	SM La Salle Tg Aru	88803	Kota Kinabalu	5.9533°N 116.0505°E
XEA5104	SMK Langkon	89108	Kota Marudu	6.5286°N 116.7097°E
XEA2082	SMK Libaran	90500	Sandakan	5.9878°N 118.0124°E
XEE4020	SMK Likas	88856	Kota Kinabalu	5.9829°N 116.0976°E
XEA4130	SMK Limbanak	89507	Penampang	5.8789°N 116.1050°E
XEA5404	SMK Lohan	89308	Ranau	5.9946°N 116.7009°E
XFE5036	SMJK Lok Yuk Kudat	89058	Kudat	6.8940°N 116.8472°E
XFE4027	SMJK Lok Yuk Likas	88803	Kota Kinabalu	5.9876°N 116.1000°E
XEA3202	SMK Madai	91209	Kunak	4.7247°N 118.1870°E
XEE4239	SMK Majakir	89608	Papar	5.7330°N 115.9267°E
XEE5435	SMK Mat Salleh Ranau	89307	Ranau	5.9505°N 116.6693°E
XEA5024	SMK Matunggong	89059	Kudat	6.7411°N 116.7258°E
XEA5405	SMK Matupang Jaya	89308	Ranau	5.7909°N 116.8175°E
XEE6101	SMK Membakut	89728	Membakut	5.4733°N 115.8010°E
XEA6100	SMK Membakut II	89727	Membakut	5.5108°N 115.7835°E
XEA6314	SMK Menumbok	89767	Menumbok	5.3013°N 115.3543°E
XEA3064	SMK Merotai Besar	91007	Tawau	4.4202°N 117.7747°E
XEA2080	SMK Merpati	90500	Sandakan	5.8878°N 118.0433°E
XEA2075	SMK Muhibbah	90000	Sandakan	5.8500°N 118.0720°E
XEA1111	SMK Nabawan	89957	Nabawan	5.0379°N 116.4380°E
XEA1113	SMK Nabawan II	89957	Nabawan	5.0025°N 116.4638°E
XEA1220	SMK Nambayan	89657	Tambunan	5.6519°N 116.3508°E
XEA5327	SMK Narinang	89158	Kota Belud	6.2185°N 116.4498°E
XEA6201	SMK Padang Berampah	89857	Sipitang	5.0151°N 115.5333°E
XEA2143	SMK Pamol	90733	Sandakan	6.0121°N 117.3924°E
XEA2079	SMK Paris	90200	Sandakan	5.2545°N 118.0571°E
XEA3070	SMK Pasir Putih	91044	Tawau	4.2994°N 117.8596°E
XEA5355	SMK Pekan II Kota Belud	89158	Kota Belud	6.3490°N 116.4139°E
XEA5353	SMK Pekan Kota Belud	89159	Kota Belud	6.3569°N 116.4340°E
XEA6315	SMK Pekan Kuala Penyu	89747	Kuala Penyu	5.5763°N 115.5913°E
XEA4301	SMK Pekan Telipok	89209	Tuaran	6.0931°N 116.1962°E
XEA2224	SMK Penangah	89320	Telupid	5.2160°N 116.8355°E
XEA4265	SMK Pengalat Papar	89607	Papar	5.7493°N 115.9525°E
XEE6221	SMK Pengiran Omar	89857	Sipitang	5.0891°N 115.5528°E
XEA6202	SMK Pengiran Omar II	89857	Sipitang	5.1075°N 115.5607°E
XEA2077	SMK Perempuan	90500	Sandakan	5.8777°N 118.0614°E
XEA4043	SMK Perempuan	88832	Kota Kinabalu	5.9838°N 116.0989°E
XEA5022	SMK Pinawantai	89050	Kudat	6.7490°N 116.7275°E
XEA5217	SMK Pinggan-Pinggan	89108	Kota Marudu	6.6715°N 116.9402°E
XEA5216	SMK Pitas	89100	Pitas	6.7086°N 117.0302°E
XEA5221	SMK Pitas II	89108	Kota Marudu	6.6779°N 117.0786°E
XEA4042	SMK Pulau Gaya	88852	Kota Kinabalu	6.0005°N 116.0608°E
XEE4110	SMK Putatan	88858	Kota Kinabalu	5.8939°N 116.0435°E
XEA5407	SMK Ranau	89308	Ranau	5.9754°N 116.6749°E
XFE6056	SMK Saint Paul	89807	Beaufort	5.3499°N 115.7416°E
XEE2031	SMK Sandakan	90716	Sandakan	5.8566°N 118.1074°E
XEA2084	SMK Sandakan Dua	90731	Sandakan	5.8567°N 118.0536°E
XEA4040	SMK Sanzac	89458	Tanjung Aru	5.9600°N 116.0657°E
XEA2081	SMK Segaliud	90729	Sandakan	5.7594°N 117.7833°E
XEA3106	SMK Segama	91122	Lahad Datu	5.0935°N 118.2446°E
XEA3104	SMK Sepagaya	91119	Lahad Datu	5.0278°N 118.2977°E
XEA1112	SMK Sepulot Nabawan	89950	Nabawan	4.7065°N 116.4824°E
XFE4045	SMJK Shan Tao	88811	Kota Kinabalu	5.9832°N 116.1028°E
XEA5004	SMK Sikuati	89058	Kudat	6.8916°N 116.6951°E
XEA5025	SMK Sikuati II	89058	Kudat	6.8744°N 116.6918°E
XEA3103	SMK Silabukan	91116	Lahad Datu	5.0137°N 118.5315°E
XEA2144	SMK Simpangan	90107	Beluran	6.3777°N 117.3708°E
XEA6203	SMK Sindumin	89859	Sipitang	4.9640°N 115.4994°E
XEA1060	SMK Sook	89008	Keningau	5.1500°N 116.3059°E
XEA4302	SMK Sri Nangka	89208	Tuaran	6.2108°N 116.2368°E
XFE1334	SMK St Anthony	89907	Tenom	5.1303°N 115.9475°E
XFE3127	SMK St Dominic	91114	Lahad Datu	5.0338°N 118.3171°E
XFE4051	SMK St Francis Convent	88300	Kota Kinabalu	5.9640°N 116.0760°E
XFE4401	SMK St James Tenghilan	89208	Tuaran	6.2496°N 116.3449°E
XFE4353	SMK St John	89208	Tuaran	6.1805°N 116.2360°E
XFE6051	SMK St John	89807	Beaufort	5.3390°N 115.7537°E
XFE4253	SMK St Joseph	89608	Papar	5.7305°N 115.9303°E
XFE1215	SMK St Martin	89657	Tambunan	5.6919°N 116.3804°E
XFE4255	SMK St Mary Papar	89608	Papar	5.7165°N 115.9479°E
XFE2044	SMK St Mary Sandakan	90705	Sandakan	5.7575°N 117.7579°E
XFE2045	SMK St Michael	90702	Sandakan	5.8409°N 118.1120°E
XFE4117	SMK St Michael	89507	Penampang	5.9094°N 116.1114°E
XFE3044	SMK St Patrick	91007	Tawau	4.2785°N 117.8897°E
XFE6101	SMK St Patrick	89727	Membakut	5.4670°N 115.7981°E
XFE6313	SMK St Peter Bundu	89747	Kuala Penyu	5.5047°N 115.5694°E
XFE5066	SMK St Peter Kudat	89058	Kudat	6.8955°N 116.8554°E
XFE4055	SMK St Peter Telipok	88450	Kota Kinabalu	6.0884°N 116.1945°E
XFE3045	SMK St Ursula	91007	Tawau	4.2546°N 117.8908°E
XFE1044	SMK St. Francis Xavier	89007	Keningau	5.3318°N 116.1532°E
XFE4058	SM Stella Maris	89457	Kota Kinabalu	5.9534°N 116.0510°E
XEA2225	SMK Sukau	90200	Kinabatangan	5.5185°N 118.2657°E
XFE2054	SMJK Sung Siew	90700	Sandakan	5.8445°N 118.1116°E
XEA4402	SMK Sungai Damit	89257	Tamparuli	6.1652°N 116.2410°E
XEA3331	SMK Tagasan	91308	Semporna	4.4286°N 118.5479°E
XEA4263	SMK Takis	89608	Papar	5.7252°N 115.9306°E
XEA2076	SMK Taman Fajar	90500	Sandakan	5.8836°N 118.0521°E
XEA4303	SMK Taman Ria	89207	Tuaran	6.1183°N 116.2109°E
XEA4044	SMK Taman Tun Fuad	88300	Kota Kinabalu	5.9473°N 116.1000°E
XEA5354	SMK Tambulion	89158	Kota Belud	6.3322°N 116.4614°E
XEA1219	SMK Tambunan	89657	Tambunan	5.7225°N 116.4034°E
XEE4401	SMK Tamparuli	89259	Tamparuli	6.1444°N 116.2606°E
XEA5101	SMK Tandek	89108	Kota Marudu	6.5349°N 116.8542°E
XEA5106	SMK Tandek 2	89108	Kota Marudu	6.5763°N 116.8590°E
XEA4129	SMK Tansau	88858	Tanjung Aru	5.8785°N 116.0561°E
XEA5351	SMK Taun Gusi	89158	Kota Belud	6.4168°N 116.4458°E
XEA5356	SMK Taun Gusi II	89159	Kota Belud	6.4402°N 116.4896°E
XEE3052	SMK Tawau	91007	Tawau	4.2627°N 117.8900°E
XEA3073	SMK Tawau II	91044	Tawau	4.2540°N 117.9135°E
XEA4046	SMK Tebobon	88450	Inanam	6.0574°N 116.1664°E
XEA5219	SMK Telaga	89100	Pitas	6.8398°N 117.0771°E
XEA2141	SMK Telupid	89320	Telupid	5.6283°N 117.1246°E
XEA4401	SMK Tenghilan	89208	Tuaran	6.2575°N 116.3333°E
XEE1338	SMK Tenom	89908	Tenom	5.1676°N 115.9616°E
XEA3107	SMK Terusan	91116	Lahad Datu	5.0098°N 118.2795°E
XEA2142	SMK Terusan Sugut	90739	Sandakan	6.4193°N 117.6996°E
XEA5401	SMK Timbua	89308	Ranau	6.1133°N 116.8601°E
XFE4021	SMJK Tinggi Kota Kinabalu	88802	Kota Kinabalu	5.9464°N 116.0717°E
XEA2085	SMK Tinusa	90500	Sandakan	5.8887°N 118.0709°E
XFE2032	SMJK Tiong Hua	90704	Sandakan	5.8599°N 118.1047°E
XEA3071	SMK Titingan	91028	Tawau	4.2430°N 117.9063°E
XEA2078	SMK Tongod	89320	Telupid	5.2720°N 116.9677°E
XEA1001	SMK Tulid	89008	Keningau	5.3262°N 116.4217°E
XEE4322	SMK Tun Fuad Stephens	89259	Tamparuli	6.0584°N 116.2834°E
XEA3101	SMK Tungku	91117	Lahad Datu	5.0218°N 118.8706°E
XEA2146	SMK Ulu Sapi	90009	Sandakan	5.7397°N 117.3846°E
XEA2140	SMK Ulu Sugut (Malinsau)	89308	Ranau	6.0934°N 116.9742°E
XEA3067	SMK Umas-Umas	91042	Tawau	4.4715°N 117.6668°E
XEA5352	SMK Usukan	89158	Kota Belud	6.4032°N 116.3880°E
XEA3072	SMK Wakuba	91028	Tawau	4.3205°N 118.0859°E
XFE3059	SMK Wallace Bay	91020	Tawau	4.2592°N 117.6706°E
XEE6061	SMK Weston	89808	Beaufort	5.2142°N 115.5995°E
XEE4038	SM Maktab Sabah	88806	Kota Kinabalu	5.9564°N 116.0673°E

=== Beaufort ===
Primary schools:

- SJK (C) Kung Ming (1)
- SJK (C) Lian Hwa
- SJK (C) Pei Yin
- SK Bandau
- SK Bangkalalak
- SK Batandok
- SK Bentuka
- SK Biah Batu 65
- SK Binsulok
- SK Bukau
- SK Gadong
- SK Garama
- SK Jabang
- SK Kabajang
- SK Karangan
- SK Kampung Bambangan
- SK Kampung Brunei
- SK Kebatu
- SK Kebulu
- SK Kepawa
- SK Kota Klias
- SK Klias Baru
- SK Klias Kecil
- SK Kukuro
- SK Lago
- SK Ladang Lumadan
- SK Lajau
- SK Lembah Poring
- SK Lingkungan
- SK Luagan
- SK Lubok
- SK Lumat
- SK Lupak
- SK Maraba
- SK Mempagar
- SK Batu 60
- SK Nukahan
- SK Padas Damit
- SK Pekan Membakut
- SK Pekan Beaufort
- SK Pengiran Jaya Pimping
- SK Pintas
- SK Rancangan Klias
- SK Saga-Saga
- SK Sinoko
- SK St. John
- SK St. Paul
- SK St. Patrick
- SK Suasa
- SK Tahak
- SK Takuli
- SK Tamalang
- SK Tiong Baru
- SK Weston

Secondary schools:

- SMK Beaufort
- SMK Beaufort II
- SMK Beaufort III
- SMK Gadong
- SMK Kota Klias
- SMK Membakut
- SMK Membakut II
- SMK St. Patrick, Membakut
- SMK St. Paul, Beaufort
- SMK St. John, Beaufort
- SMK Weston

=== Keningau ===
Primary schools:

- SJK (C) Cheng Ming
- SJK (C) Yuk Kong
- SJK (C) Yuk Yin
- SK Ambual
- SK Ansip
- SK Apin-Apin
- SK Banjar
- SK Batu Lunguyan
- SK Binuwou Tengah
- SK Binakaan
- SK Binanon
- SK Binaong
- SK Bingkor
- SK Bonor
- SK Bulu Silou
- SK Bunang Sook
- SK Bundu Apin-Apin
- SK Bunga Raya
- SK Bunsit
- SK Dalit
- SK Delayan Tulid
- SK Gaulan
- SK Inandung
- SK Kabatang Baru
- SK Kalampun
- SK Kampung Baru
- SK Kampung Biah
- SK Kampung Keningau
- SK Karamatoi
- SK Kawakaan
- SK Jaya Baru
- SK Kampung Beriawa Ulu
- SK Kapayan Baru
- SK Kebulu
- SK Kuala Kahaba
- SK Liau Apin-Apin
- SK Lintuhun Baru
- SK Luagan
- SK Magatang
- SK Malaing
- SK Malima
- SK Mamagun
- SK Mansiat
- SK Membulu
- SK Menawo
- SK Merampong
- SK Meninipir
- SK Nandagan
- SK Nangkawangan
- SK Pangas
- SK Pasir Puteh
- SK Patikang Laut
- SK Pekan Keningau
- SK Pekan Keningau II
- SK Penagatan
- SK Pohon Batu
- SK Rancangan Belia Tiulon
- SK Rancangan Biah
- SK Senagang
- SK Simbuan Tulid
- SK Sinaron Tengah
- SK Sinua
- SK Sinulihan Baru
- SK Sodomon
- SK Sook
- SK St. Francis Xavier
- SK St. James Apin-Apin
- SK Tuarid Taud
- SK Tulid
- SK Ulu Liawan
- SK Ulu Senagang

Secondary schools:

- SM St. Francis Xavier
- SMK Apin-Apin
- SMK Bingkor
- SMK Gunsanad
- SMK Gunsanad II
- SMK Keningau
- SMK Keningau II
- SMJK Ken Hwa
- SMK Sook
- SMK Tulid

=== Kinabatangan ===
Primary schools:

- SK Abai
- SK Balat
- SK Batu Puteh
- SK Bilit
- SK Buang Sayang
- SK Bukit Garam
- SK Bukit Garam II
- SK Desa Permai
- SK Jaya Baru
- SK Kampung Suan Lamba
- SK Kota Kinabatangan
- SK Kuala Suan Lamba
- SK Kuamut
- SK Ladang Bode Kretam
- SK Ladang Sungai Bendera
- SK Ladang Tomanggong
- SK Litang
- SK Paris
- SK Paris 3
- SK Rancangan Suan Lamba
- SK Sandau
- SK Sangau
- SK Sapagaya
- SK Sentosa Jaya
- SK Sinar Jaya
- SK Singgah Manis
- SK Sri Ganda
- SK Sukau
- SK Sungai Lokan
- SK Tidung Tabin
- SK Tundun Bohangin

Secondary schools:

- SMK Bukit Garam
- SMK Bukit Garam II
- SMK Paris
- SMK Sukau

=== Kota Belud ===
Primary schools:

- SJK (C) Chung Hwa
- SK Ambong
- SK Bangkahak Baru
- SK Dalas
- SK Dudar
- SK Gensurai
- SK Jawi-Jawi
- SK Keguraan
- SK Labuan
- SK Kaung
- SK Kebayau
- SK Kelawat
- SK Kesapang
- SK Kiau
- SK Kinasaraban
- SK Kuala Abai
- SK Kulambai
- SK Lasau Podi
- SK Lasau Tintapon
- SK Melangkap
- SK Mengkulat
- SK Menunggui
- SK Nahaba
- SK Nanamun
- SK Narinang
- SK Pandasan
- SK Pangkalan Abai
- SK Pekan Kota Belud
- SK Peladok
- SK Piasau
- SK Pinolobu
- SK Pituru
- SK Podos
- SK Pulau Mantanani
- SK Rampayan Ulu
- SK Rangalau
- SK Rosok
- SK Sarang
- SK Sayap
- SK Sembirai
- SK Suang Punggor
- SK St. Edmund
- SK Taburan
- SK Taginambur
- SK Tamau
- SK Tambatuan
- SK Tambulian
- SK Tampasuk I
- SK Tampasuk II
- SK Tamu Darat
- SK Tarintidon
- SK Tengkurus
- SK Taun Gusi
- SK Timbang
- SK Timbang Dayang
- SK Tuguson
- SK Ulu Kukut

Secondary schools:

- SMK Arshad
- SMK Narinang
- SMK Pekan Kota Belud
- SMK Pekan II Kota Belud
- SMK Tambulion
- SMK Taun Gusi
- SMK Usukan

=== Kota Kinabalu ===
Primary schools:

- SJK (C) Che Hwa Kolombong
- SJK (C) Chung Hwa Likas
- SJK (C) Chung Hwa Kampung Air
- SJK (C) Good Shepherd, Manggatal
- SJK (C) Lok Yuk Likas
- SJK (C) Lok Yuk Manggatal
- SJK (C) Shan Tao
- SJK (C) St. James
- SJK (C) St. Peter Telipok
- SJK (C) Yick Nam
- SK Api-Api
- SK Babagon Toki
- SK Bantayan
- SK Bukit Padang
- SK Darau
- SK Gantisan
- SK Gudon
- SK Inanam II
- SK Inanam Laut
- SK Kebagu
- SK Kebayau
- SK Keronggu
- SK Kitobu
- SK Kokol
- SK Kolombong
- SK Lapasan
- SK Likas
- SK Lok Yuk Inanam
- SK Lok Yuk Likas
- SK Luyang
- SK Malawa
- SK Mutiara
- SK Natai
- SK Pangkalan TLDM Kota Kinabalu
- SK Pengiran Siti Hafsah
- SK Pomotodon
- SK Poring-Poring
- SK Pulau Sepanggar
- SK Pulau Gaya
- SK Rampayan
- SK Ruminding
- SK Sacred Heart
- SK Sembulan
- SK Sri Gaya
- SK St. Agnes
- SK St. Catherine
- SK St. Francis Convent
- SK Stella Maris
- SK Talungan
- SK Tampulan
- SK Tanjung Aru I
- SK Tanjung Aru II
- SK Tobobon
- SK Tombongon
- SK Unggun
- SK (Cina) Anglo-Chinese

Secondary schools:

- SM Maktab Sabah
- SMK All Saints
- SMK Bandaraya
- SMK Inanam
- SMK Kolombong
- SM La Salle
- SMJK Lok Yuk Likas
- SMK Likas
- SMK Perempuan Likas
- SMK Pulau Gaya
- SMK Taman Tun Fuad
- SMK Tinggi Kota Kinabalu
- SMK Tobobon
- SMK SANZAC
- SMJK Shan Tao
- SMK St. Francis Convent
- SMK St. Peter Telipok
- SM Stella Maris

Sixth form college:

- Kolej Tingkatan Enam Kota Kinabalu

=== Kota Marudu ===
Primary schools:

- SJK (C) Khoi Ming
- SK Bengkongan
- SK Bintasan
- SK Gana
- SK Koromoko
- SK Kota Marudu II
- SK Lampada
- SK Langkon
- SK Magandai
- SK Mangaris
- SK Mangin
- SK Marak-Parak
- SK Masalog
- SK Melangkap
- SK Ongkilan
- SK Panaitan
- SK Pekan Kota Marudu
- SK Popok
- SK Ranau
- SK Samparita
- SK Sampir
- SK Simpangan
- SK Sunsui
- SK Tagaroh
- SK Tagibang
- SK Talantang
- SK Tandek
- SK Tanjung Batu
- SK Taritipan
- SK Temuno Teringai Darat
- SK Tigaman
- SK Timbang Batu
- SK Tumunda Salimandut

Secondary schools:

- SMK Bandau
- SMK Bengkongan
- SMK Kota Marudu I
- SMK Kota Marudu II
- SMK Langkon
- SMK Tandek

=== Kuala Penyu ===
Primary schools:

- SJK (C) Chung Hwa
- SJK (C) Phui Hwa
- SK Batu Linting
- SK Berangkok
- SK Janang
- SK Kekapor
- SK Kilugus
- SK Lambidan
- SK Mansud
- SK Melikai
- SK Menumpang
- SK Menunggang
- SK Palu-Palu
- SK Pekan Kuala Penyu
- SK Pekan Menumbok
- SK Rimbaan
- SK Sangkabok
- SK Sinapokan
- SK St. Augustine
- SK St. Joseph
- SK St. Peter Bundu
- SK St. Stephen
- SK Tanjung Aru
- SK Tempurong
- SK Tenambak

Secondary schools:

- SMK Kuala Penyu
- SMK Menumbok
- SMK Pekan Kuala Penyu

=== Kudat ===
Primary schools:

- SJK (C) Hwa Lian
- SJK (C) Lok Yuk Batu 1
- SJK (C) Lok Yuk Pinangsoo
- SJK (C) Our Lady Immaculate
- SJK (C) Sacred Heart Tajau
- SJK (C) St. Peter
- SJK (C) Yuk Hwa Tamalang
- SK Balambangan Banggi
- SK Bangau
- SK Barambangon
- SK Batu Layar
- SK Bingolon
- SK Dampirit
- SK Dogoton
- SK Dualog
- SK Garau
- SK Gumandang
- SK Indarason Laut
- SK Kampung Minyak
- SK Kapitangan
- SK Karakit Banggi
- SK Lajong
- SK Laksian
- SK Lampaki
- SK Landung Ayang
- SK Limau-Limauan
- SK Limbuak
- SK Lodung
- SK Lok Yuk Batu 1
- SK Lok Yuk Sikuati
- SK Lok Yuk Tamalang
- SK Lokoton
- SK Loktohog Banggi
- SK Lotong
- SK Matunggong
- SK Muhibbah
- SK Nangka
- SK Padang
- SK Palak
- SK Panudahan
- SK Parapat Darat
- SK Pata
- SK Pekan Kudat II
- SK Perapat Laut
- SK Pinawantai
- SK Pulau Tigabu
- SK Sabur
- SK Sebayan
- SK Semayan Banggi
- SK Sikuati
- SK St. James
- SK Suangpai
- SK Tanjung Manawali
- SK Terongkongan
- SK Tiga Papan
- SK Tinangol
- SK Tun Datu Haji Mustapha

Secondary schools:

- SM Pei Tsin
- SM St. Peter
- SMK Abdul Rahim
- SMK Abdul Rahim II
- SMK Banggi
- SMK Kudat
- SMK Kudat II
- SMK Matunggong
- SMK Pinawantai
- SMK Sikuati
- SMK Sikuati II

=== Kunak ===
Primary schools:

- SJK (C) Pai Sheng
- SK Gading-Gading
- SK Kampung Selamat
- SK Kunak I
- SK Kunak II
- SK Kunak Jaya
- SK Ladang Binuang
- SK Ladang Giram
- SK Lormalong
- SK Madai
- SK Mostyn
- SK Pangi
- SK Skim Kokos
- SK Tanjung Keramat
- SK Tun Fuad

Secondary schools:

- SMK Madai
- SMK Kunak
- SMK Kunak Jaya

=== Labuk–Sugut ===
Primary schools:

- SK Abuan
- SK Balaban Jaya
- SK Basai Baru
- SK Bawang
- SK Binsulung
- SK Botition
- SK Bukit Besi
- SK Golong
- SK Holy Cross
- SK Jambongan
- SK Jaya Bakti
- SK Kabuluh
- SK Keniogan
- SK Kolapis
- SK Ladang Sabapalm
- SK Lidong
- SK Limau-Limau
- SK Lingkabau
- SK Lubang Buaya
- SK Maidan
- SK Malalin
- SK Matanggal Beluran
- SK Monopod
- SK Moynod
- SK Nangoh
- SK Obah
- SK Pamol
- SK Pantai Boring
- SK Pekan Beluran
- SK Perancangan
- SK Pinangkau
- SK Semawang
- SK Seri Pagi
- SK Simpangan
- SK Sualok
- SK Sungai Nafas
- SK Sungai Nangka
- SK Sungai Sapi
- SK Sungai-Sungai
- SK Tagas-Tagas
- SK Tampat
- SK Tangkarason
- SK Tanjung Nipis
- SK Terusan Sugut
- SK Tetabuan
- SK Ulu Muanad

Secondary schools:

- SMK Balaban Jaya, Beluran
- SMK Beluran
- SMK Beluran II
- SMK Pamol, Beluran
- SMK Terusan Sugut, Beluran

=== Lahad Datu ===
Primary schools:

- SJK (C) Chee Vun
- SJK (C) Kiau Shing
- SJK (C) Siew Ching
- SJK (C) Sin Wah
- SJK (C) Yuk Choi
- SK Amalania
- SK Aakapit
- SK Bangingod
- SK Batu 6 1/2 Segama
- SK Bikang
- SK Binuang
- SK Bukit Balacon
- SK Cenderawasih
- SK Fajar Harapan
- SK Jeroco
- SK Kennedy Bay
- SK Lahad Datu II
- SK Lahad Datu III
- SK Lahad Datu IV
- SK Lok Buani
- SK Payang
- SK Pekan Lahad Datu
- SK Permai
- SK Sabah Cocoa
- SK Sahabat 16
- SK Sahabat 4
- SK Sahabat 2
- SK Sepagaya
- SK Silabukan
- SK Silam
- SK Sri Darun
- SK Sri Pantai
- SK St. Dominic
- SK St. Stephens
- SK Tambisan
- SK Tanjong Paras
- SK Tanjung Labian
- SK Tawaiyari
- SK Telisai
- SK Terusan
- SK Tungku
- SK Ulu Tungku
- SK Unico Desa

Secondary schools:

- SMK Agaseh
- SMK Desa Kencana
- SMK Sepagaya
- SMK Segama
- SMK Silabukan
- SMK St. Dominic
- SMK Tungku

=== Papar ===
Primary schools:

- SJK (C) Anglo Chinese
- SJK (C) Bong Hwa
- SJK (C) Cheng Hwa
- SJK (C) Cheng Ming
- SJK (C) Hwa Yin Rampazan
- SJK (C) Kin Kiau
- SJK (C) Sen Ming
- SJK (C) St. Joseph
- SJK (C) Tung Shan
- SK Belatik
- SK Benoni
- SK Buang Sayang
- SK Daingin
- SK Gana
- SK Kaiduan
- SK Kambizaan
- SK Kawang
- SK Kayau
- SK Kelanahan
- SK Kelatuan
- SK Kimanis
- SK Kogopon
- SK Kuala Papar
- SK Langkawit
- SK Limputong
- SK Lingan
- SK Mandahan
- SK Mandalipau
- SK Mook
- SK Nyaris-Nyaris
- SK Our Lady
- SK Padawan Besar
- SK Pantai Manis
- SK Pekan Bongawan
- SK Pekan Kimanis
- SK Pekan Kinarut
- SK Pekan Papar
- SK Pengalat Besar
- SK Pengalat Kecil
- SK Rampazan
- SK Sabandil
- SK Sacred Heart Kampung Biau
- SK St. Joseph
- SK St. Mary
- SK Sumbiling
- SK Surati
- SK Tampasak
- SK Tanaki
- SK Ulu Lumagar
- SK Viging Ulu

Secondary schools:

- SM St. Mary
- SMK Benoni
- SMK Bongawan
- SMK Kinarut
- SMK Majakir
- SMK Takis

=== Penampang ===
Primary schools:

- SJK (C) Hwa Shiong
- SJK (C) Yue Min
- SK Babagon
- SK Bahang
- SK Buayan
- SK Buit Hill
- SK Kampung Contoh
- SK Kem Lok Kawi
- SK Kibabaig
- SK Kipovo
- SK Longkogungon
- SK Moyog
- SK Pekan Putatan
- SK Penampang
- SK Petagas
- SK Putaton Inobong
- SK Puun Tonoh
- SK St. Aloysius Limbanak
- SK St. Anthony
- SK St. Joseph
- SK St. Paul Kolopis
- SK Sugud
- SK Tampasak Togudon
- SK Tansau
- SK Terian
- SK Tombovo

Secondary schools:

- SM St. Michael
- SMK Bahang
- SMK Datuk Peter Mojuntin
- SMK Limbanak
- SMK Putatan
- SMK Tansau

=== Pensiangan ===
Primary schools:

- SK Babalitan
- SK Kampung Bahagia
- SK Kampung Enam
- SK Kebu Baru
- SK Kuala Salong
- SK Labang
- SK Layon
- SK Longongon
- SK Lotong
- SK Pandiwan
- SK Pekan Nabawan
- SK Pekan Pensiangan
- SK Pementerian
- SK Pengaraan
- SK Penontomon
- SK Salarom
- SK Saliku
- SK Saliliran
- SK Salinatan
- SK Sapulut
- SK Sasandukon
- SK Sibangali
- SK Simatuoh
- SK Tampusison
- SK Tetagas
- SK Tinanduk
- SK Ulu Mosopoh

Secondary schools:

- SMK Nabawan
- SMK Nabawan II
- SMK Sapulut

=== Pitas ===
Primary schools:

- SK Bawang
- SK Bawing
- SK Bongkol
- SK Dallas
- SK Dandun
- SK Datong
- SK Kanibongan
- SK Kasagaan
- SK Kibubuk
- SK Kusilad
- SK Liu
- SK Malubang
- SK Mandurian
- SK Manggis
- SK Mangkapon
- SK Mapan-Mapan
- SK Maringgan
- SK Nibang
- SK Pandan Mandamai
- SK Pantai
- SK Pekan Pitas
- SK Pekan Pitas II
- SK Pinapak
- SK Pinggan-Pinggan
- SK Rosob
- SK Rukom
- SK Salimpodon Darat
- SK Senaja
- SK Sosop
- SK Telaga

Secondary schools:

- SMK Bongkol
- SMK Kanibongan
- SMK Pinggan-Pinggan
- SMK Pitas
- SMK Pitas II
- SMK Telaga

=== Ranau ===
Primary schools:

- SJK (C) Pai Wen
- SK Badukan
- SK Bongkud
- SK Bundu Tuhan
- SK Don Bosco
- SK Gana-Gana
- SK Gusi
- SK Kaingaran
- SK Kampung Libang
- SK Kananapon
- SK Kandawayon
- SK Karagasan
- SK Kauluan
- SK Kawiyan Sugut
- SK Kemburungoh
- SK Kepangian
- SK Keranaan
- SK Kilimu
- SK Kimondou
- SK Kinapulidan
- SK Kinasaraban
- SK Kinirasan
- SK Kirokot
- SK Kituntul
- SK Kundasang
- SK Langsat
- SK Lipasu
- SK Lohan
- SK Longut
- SK Malinsau
- SK Mangkapoh
- SK Marakau
- SK Matupang
- SK Maukab
- SK Mesilou
- SK Miruru
- SK Mohimboyon
- SK Nalapak
- SK Nampasan
- SK Napong
- SK Naradan
- SK Narawang
- SK Nukakatan
- SK Nunuk Ragang
- SK Paginatan
- SK Pahu Himbaan
- SK Paus
- SK Pekan II Ranau
- SK Pekan Ranau
- SK Perancangan
- SK Pinausuk
- SK Pinawantai
- SK Poring
- SK Randagong
- SK Ratau
- SK Sagiban
- SK Sagindai
- SK Sri Gabungan
- SK St. Benedict
- SK Tagudon Lama
- SK Tampios
- SK Tarawas
- SK Tiang
- SK Tibabar
- SK Timbua
- SK Tinanom
- SK Toboh
- SK Togop Darat
- SK Tongou
- SK Tudan
- SK Waang

Secondary schools:

- SMK Bundu Tuhan
- SMK Kemburongoh
- SMK Kundasang
- SMK Lohan
- SMK Mat Salleh
- SMK Matupang Jaya
- SMK Ranau
- SMK Timbua
- SMK Ulu Sugut

=== Sandakan ===
- SM Convent St. Cecilia
- SM St. Mary
- SM St. Mike
- SM Yu Yuan
- SMK Batu Sapi
- SMK Berhala Darat
- SMK Elopura
- SMK Elopura 2
- SMK Merpati
- SMK Muhibbah
- SMK Pamol
- SMK Perempuan Sandakan
- SMK Sandakan
- SMK Sandakan 2
- SMK Simpangan
- SMK Taman Fajar

=== Semporna ===
- SMK Datuk Haji Panglima Jakarullah
- SMK Datuk Panglima Abdullah
- SMK Bugaya
- SMK Bugaya 2
- SMK Bum-Bum
- SMK Kabogan
- SMK Kabogan 2
- SMK Tagasan

=== Sipitang ===
- SMK Padang Berampah
- SMK Pengiran Omar
- SMK Pengiran Omar II
- SMK Sindumin

=== Tambunan ===
- SM St. Martin Tampasak
- SMK Desa Wawasan
- SMK Nambayan
- SMK Tambunan

=== Tawau ===
- SM Holy Trinity
- SM St. Patrick
- SM Convent St. Ursula
- SMK Abaka
- SMK Balung
- SMK Balung Bestari
- SMK Jalan Apas
- SMK Jambatan Putih
- SMK Kabota
- SMK Kalabakan
- SMK Kinabutan
- SMK Kuhara
- SMK Merotai Besar
- SMK Tawau
- SMK Umas-Umas
- SMK Wallace Bay

=== Tenom ===
- SMK Chinta Mata
- SMJK Chung Hwa
- SMK Entabuan
- SMK Kemabong
- SMK St. Anthony
- SMK Tenom

=== Tongod ===
- SMK Entilibon
- SMK Penangah
- SMK Telupid
- SMK Tongod
- SMK Ulu Sapi

=== Tuaran ===
Primary schools:

- Sekolah Agama Suria, Tuaran
- SJK (C) Chen Sin, Tuaran
- SJK (C) Chung Hwa Tenghilan
- SJK (C) Chung Hwa Tamparuli
- SJK (C) Kok Wah Talibong, Tamparuli
- SJK (C) St. Philip, Tamparuli
- SK Bantayan, Tamparuli
- SK Baru-Baru, Tuaran
- SK Bawang, Tamparuli
- SK Berungis, Tuaran
- SK Bolong, Tuaran
- SK Bongol, Tamparuli
- SK Bundung, Tamparuli
- SK Bundu Tohuri, Tamparuli
- SK Bungalio, Tamparuli
- SK Gayang, Tuaran
- SK Gayaratau, Tamparuli
- SK Giok, Kiulu
- SK Gontung, Tamparuli
- SK Guakon Baru, Tamparuli
- SK Kauluan, Tamparuli
- SK Kayangat, Tamparuli
- SK Kelawat, Tamparuli
- SK Kindu, Tuaran
- SK Kitapol, Tamparuli
- SK Koporingan, Tamparuli
- SK Laputong, Tamparuli
- SK Laya-Laya, Tuaran
- SK Lingga Baru, Tamparuli
- SK Linungkuan, Tamparuli
- SK Lokos, Kiulu
- SK Lokub, Kiulu
- SK Lok Yuk Telipok
- SK Kapa, Tamparuli
- SK Malangang Baru, Kiulu
- SK Mantob, Tamparuli
- SK Mengkabong, Tuaran
- SK Nongkolud, Tuaran
- SK Pahu, Tamparuli
- SK Pekan Kiulu
- SK Pekan Tamparuli
- SK Pekan Telipok
- SK Pekan Tenghilan
- SK Pekan Tuaran
- SK Penimbawan, Tuaran
- SK Poring, Tamparuli
- SK Pukak, Tamparuli
- SK Rangalau Baru, Kiulu
- SK Rangalau Lama, Kiulu
- SK Rugading, Tuaran
- SK Rungus, Tamparuli
- SK Rungus Nahaba, Tamparuli
- SK Sambah, Tenghilan
- SK Saradan, Tenghilan
- SK Selupoh, Tuaran
- SK Serusup, Tuaran
- SK Sinulihan, Tamparuli
- SK St. John, Tuaran
- SK Sungai Damit, Tamparuli
- SK Sungoi, Kiulu
- SK Taginambur, Tamparuli
- SK Tambalang, Tuaran
- SK Tambulaong, Tuaran
- SK Termunong, Tuaran
- SK Tinambak, Tamparuli
- SK Tiong Perungusan, Tamparuli
- SK Togop, Tamparuli
- SK Tombongon, Tamparuli
- SK Tomis, Tamparuli
- SK Topokon, Tamparuli
- SK Tudan, Kiulu
- SK Wangkod, Tamparuli
- SK Wasai, Kiulu

Secondary schools:

- SM St. James, Tenghilan
- SM St. John, Tuaran
- SMK Badin, Tuaran
- SMK Pekan Telipok
- SMK Taman Ria, Tuaran
- SMK Tamparuli
- SMK Tenghilan
- SMK Tun Fuad Stephens, Kiulu
- SMK Seri Nangka, Tuaran
- SMK Sungai Damit, Tamparuli

== See also ==
- Education in Malaysia
