= Papar District =

- District
- Daerah Papar

Other transcription(s)
  - Jawi: داءيره ڤاڤر
  - Chinese: 吧巴县 (Simplified) 吧巴縣 (Traditional); Babā xiàn (Hanyu Pinyin)
  - Tamil: பாப்பார் மாவட்டம் Pāppār māvaṭṭam (Transliteration)
  - Kadazandusun: Uvang/Watas Papar
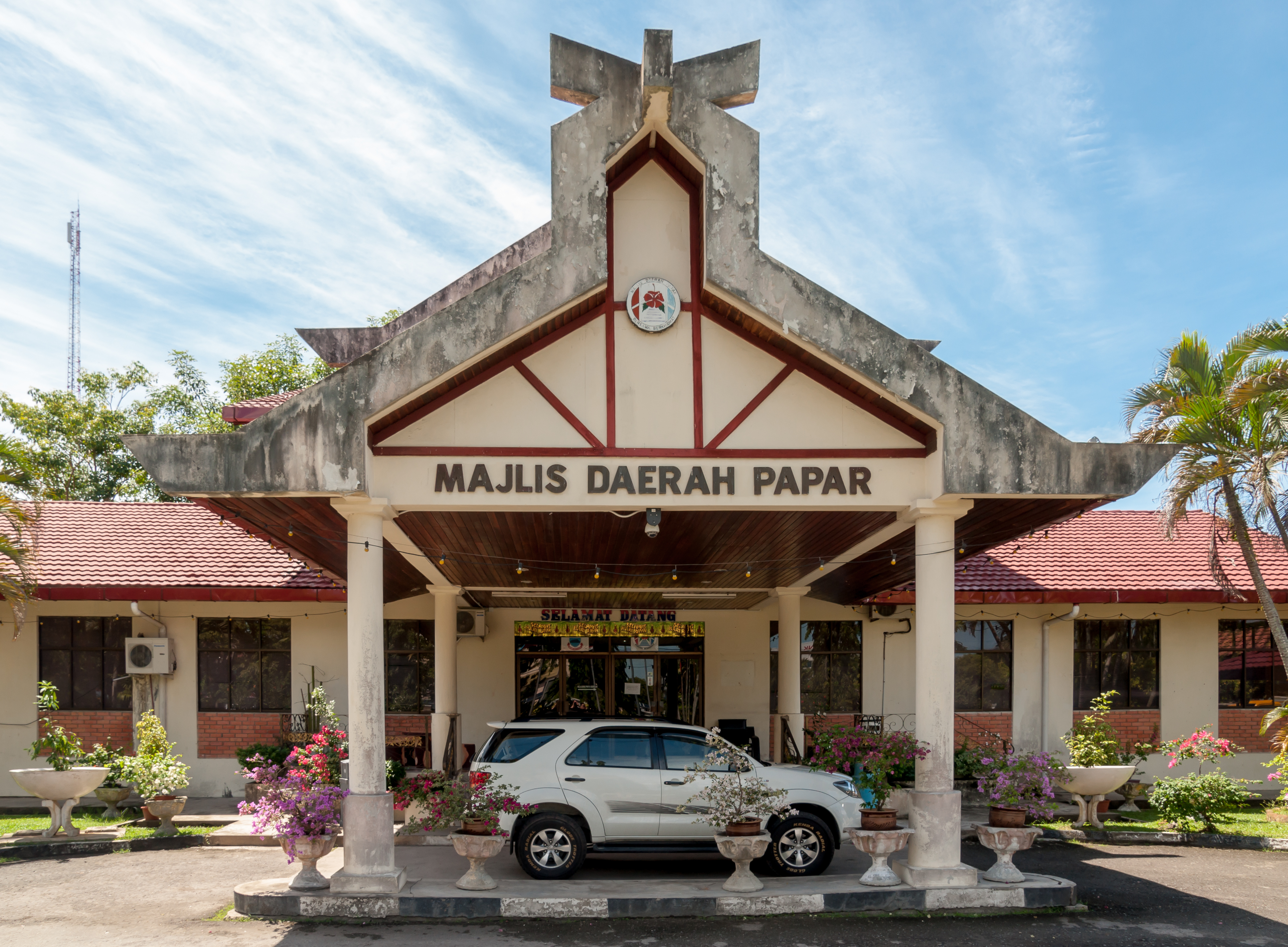
- Papar District Council office.

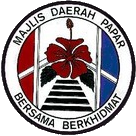
- Seal

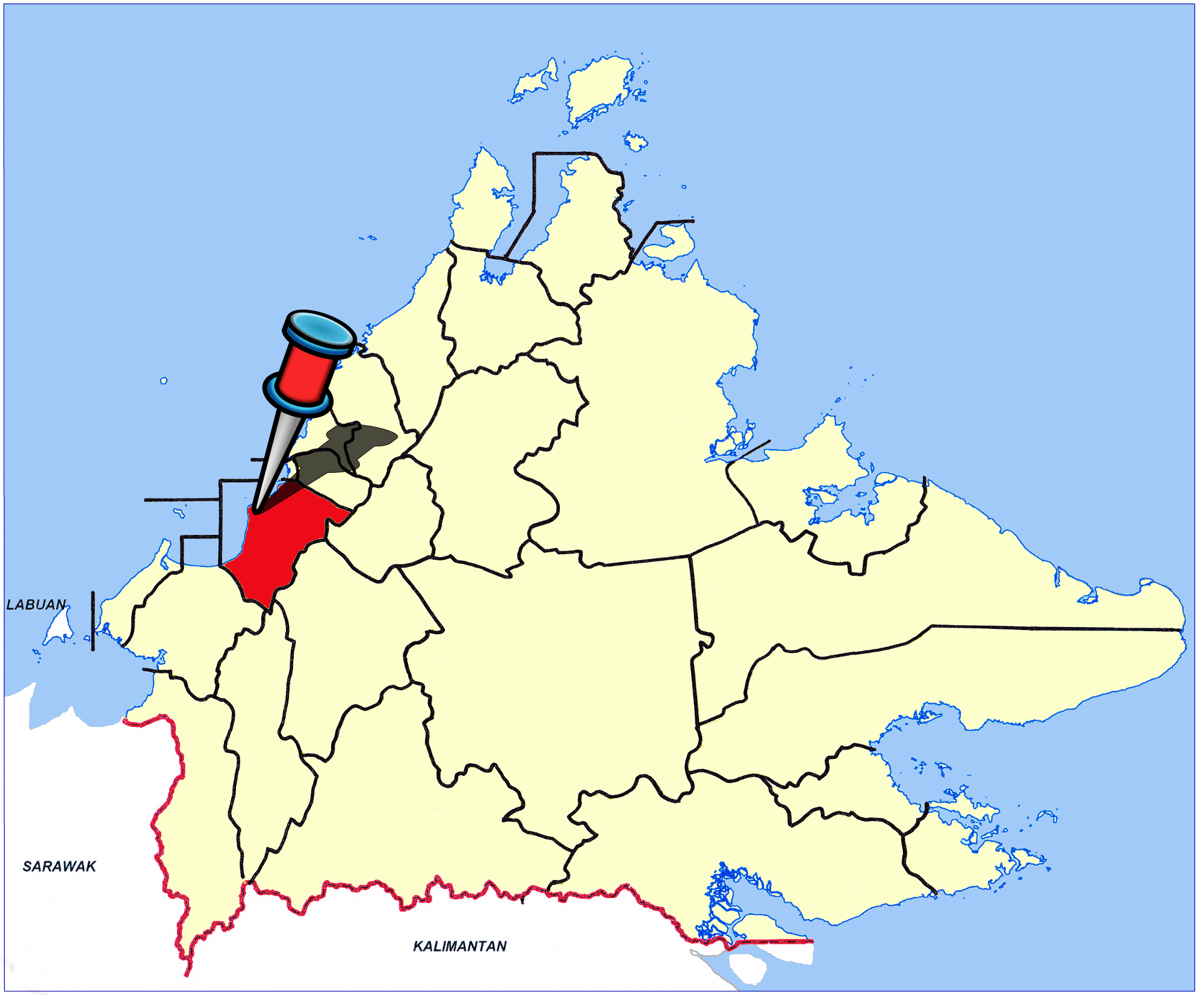
- Coordinates: 5°44′00″N 115°56′00″E
- Country: Malaysia
- State: Sabah
- Division: West Coast
- Capital: Papar

Government
  - District Officer: Mohd. Rafik Hj. Abdul Jubar

Area
  - Total: 1,248 km^{2} (482 sq mi)

Population (2020)
  - Total: 167,337
  - Density: 134.1/km^{2} (347.3/sq mi)
- Postcode: 89XXX
- Website: mdpapar.sbh.gov.my pdpapar.sbh.gov.my

Map of Papar District

The Papar District (Malay: Daerah Papar) is an administrative district in the Malaysian state of Sabah, part of the West Coast Division which includes the districts of Kota Belud, Kota Kinabalu, Papar, Penampang, Putatan, Ranau and Tuaran. The capital of the district is in Papar Town.

== Etymology ==
The name 'Papar' comes from a Bruneian word meaning 'flat or open land'.

== History ==
As with most of the west coast of Sabah, it was originally ruled by the Bruneian sultanate. Its first local leader was Datu Amir Bahar, of Bajau descent. It was then handed to Overbeck and Dent brothers in 1877 by the Sultanate of Brunei. The first British officer to serve in Papar was H.L. Leicester, who took office in February 1878 aiming to increase Papar's revenues. He was replaced by Alfred Hart Everett after failing to improve Papar's economic outlook.

== Demographics ==
Historical population
Year	Pop.	±%
1991	59,473	—
2000	88,626	+49.0%
2010	124,420	+40.4%
2020	150,667	+21.1%

According to the last census in 2020, the population of Papar district is estimated to be around 150,667 inhabitants, comprising Bruneian Malay (especially in Benoni, Buang Sayang, Bongawan, Kampung Laut, Kelanahan, Kimanis, Kinarut), Kadazan-Dusun (especially in Rampazan, Limbahau, Kinarut, Kopimpinan, Lakut, Mondolipau, Koiduan, Ulu Kimanis, Sumbiling, Limputung) and Bajau (mainly in Pengalat Besar, Pengalat Kecil, Kawang, Beringgis). A significant number of Chinese comprising mainly Hakkas (including those of mixed ancestry or "Sino-Natives") also exist in the district. As in other districts of Sabah, there are a significant number of illegal immigrants from the nearby southern Philippines, mainly from the Sulu Archipelago and Mindanao, many of whom are not included in the population statistics.

Ethnic composition of Papar District (2020)
Ethnicities / Nationality	Percentage
Malays	24.35%
Other Bumiputeras	62.97%
Chinese	3.68%
Indians	0.11%
Others	0.61%
Non-Malaysians	8.28%

Ethnicity	2020	
Ethnicity	Pop.	%
Malays	36685	24.35%
Other Bumiputeras	94880	62.97%
Chinese	5543	3.68%
Indians	160	0.11%
Others	920	0.61%
Malaysian total	138188	91.72%
Non-Malaysian	12479	8.28%
Total	150667	100.00%

== Education ==
Papar is known as the West Coast Division education hub. Institut Kemahiran Belia Negara (National Youth Skill Institute) or IKBN and Maktab Rendah Sains MARA (MARA Science College) or MRSM are the first IKBN and MRSM built in Sabah. There are also Jabatan Pembangunan Sumber Manusia or "JPSM" which has been developed in the late 1990s. Among the main secondary schools are SMK Pengalat, SMK Majakir, SMK Benoni, SMK Takis, SMK Kinarut, SMK Bongawan, SM St. Joseph, SMK Kimanis and SMK St. Mary Limbahau. Papar has the most religious schools among districts; SMK(A) Tun Datu Mustapha, SMK(A) Limauan, new SMA Toh Puan Hajah Rahmah and SMA Islamiah Papar. Amongst all government schools, institutions termed as SMK are under central government administration under the federal Education Ministry's control via the state education department, whilst institutions termed as SMA are under state government administration through the state's Islamic Affairs department. Papar education complex type area is situated at Kinarut which includes the IKBN, MRSM, SMK(A) Tun Datu Mustapha and SMA Toh Puan Hajah Rahmah. A number of primary schools also can be found in the district such as SK Sacred Heart Biau, SK Padawan, SK Limputong, SK St. Joseph, SK Benoni, SK Surati (which is also the location of the District Education Office), SK Pengalat, SK Kinarut, SK St. Mary Limbahau, SK Takis, SJKC Cheng Hwa and much more.

== Tourism ==
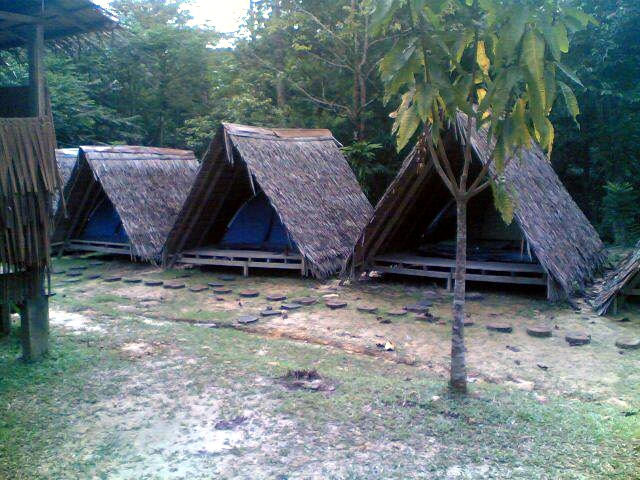
Utan Paradise Jungle Camp.

Tourism is an important industry in Papar, arguably coming after the agriculture industry. Many resorts can be found along the coast. Some of the tourist attractions in the district are:

- Beringgis Beach Resort & Spa
- Langkah Syabas Beach Resort
- Dinawan Island
- Melinsung Bay Beach Resort
- Kawang Forest Centre
- KK Adventure Park
- Anjung Peranginan Seri Serbang Homestay Bongawan
- Borneo River Cruise (Wildlife, Sunset, Firefly), Bongawan
- Tagal Kampung Kinolosodon
- Mandalipau White Water View & Fishpond
- Borneo Cultural Village
- Pantai Manis, Papar
- Mondikot Deer Camp
- Ovai Hidden Paradise Resort, Papar
- Pantai Kenangan, Bongawan
- Beringgis Riverside Seafood Restaurant
- Papar Riverfront
- Artitaya Borneo Golf, Bongawan

== Gallery ==
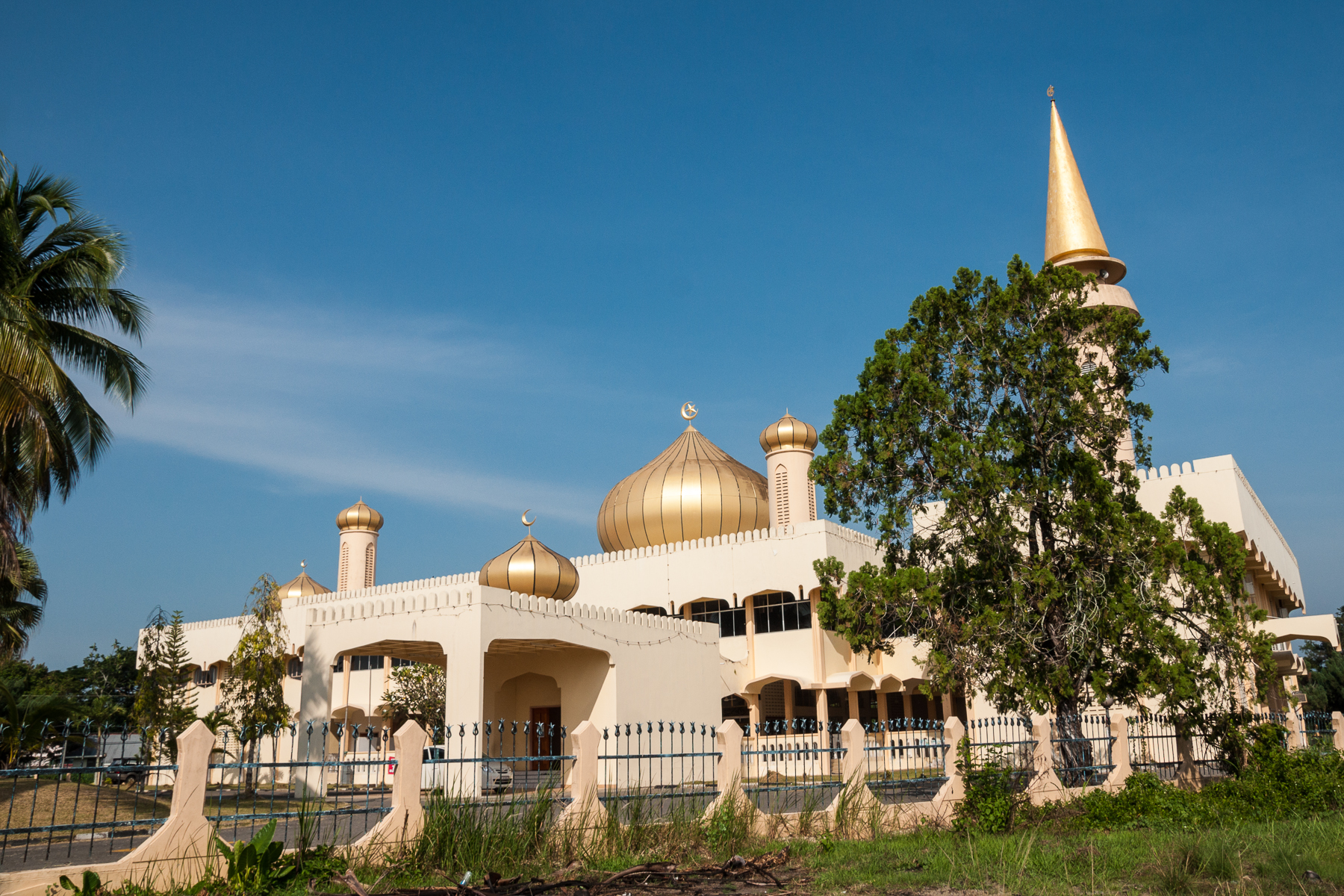
Papar District Mosque.

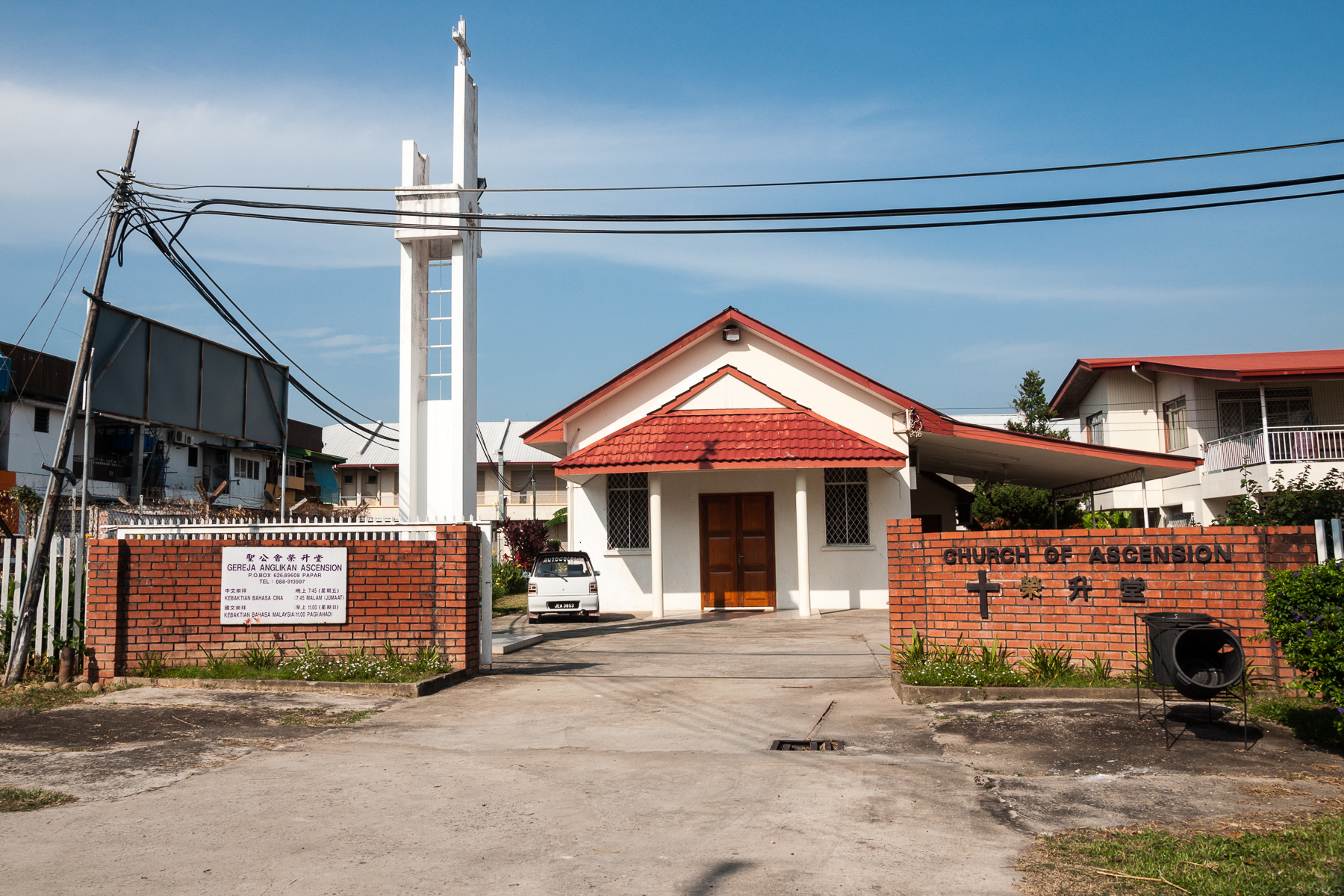
Papar Anglican Church of Ascension.

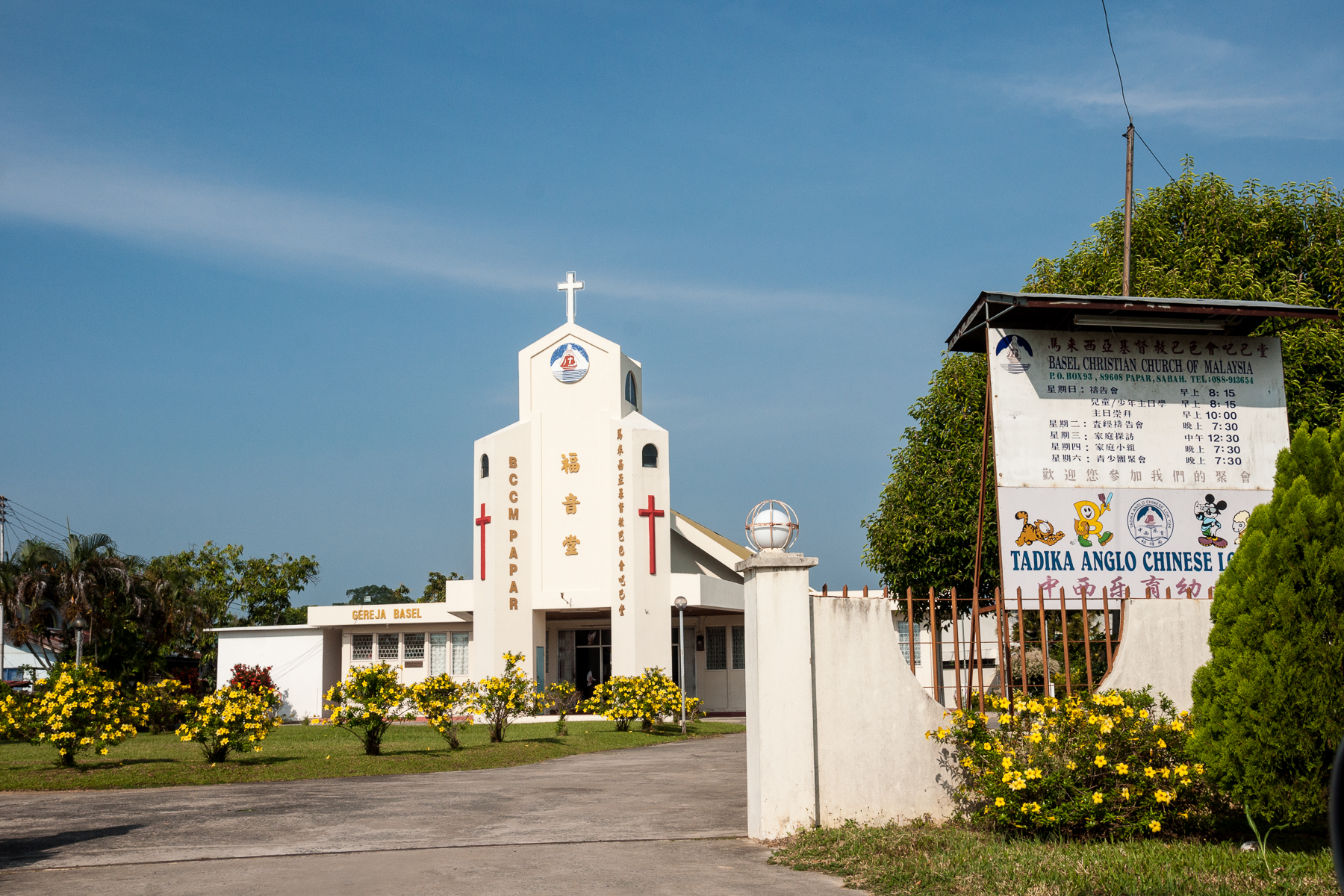
Papar Basel Church.

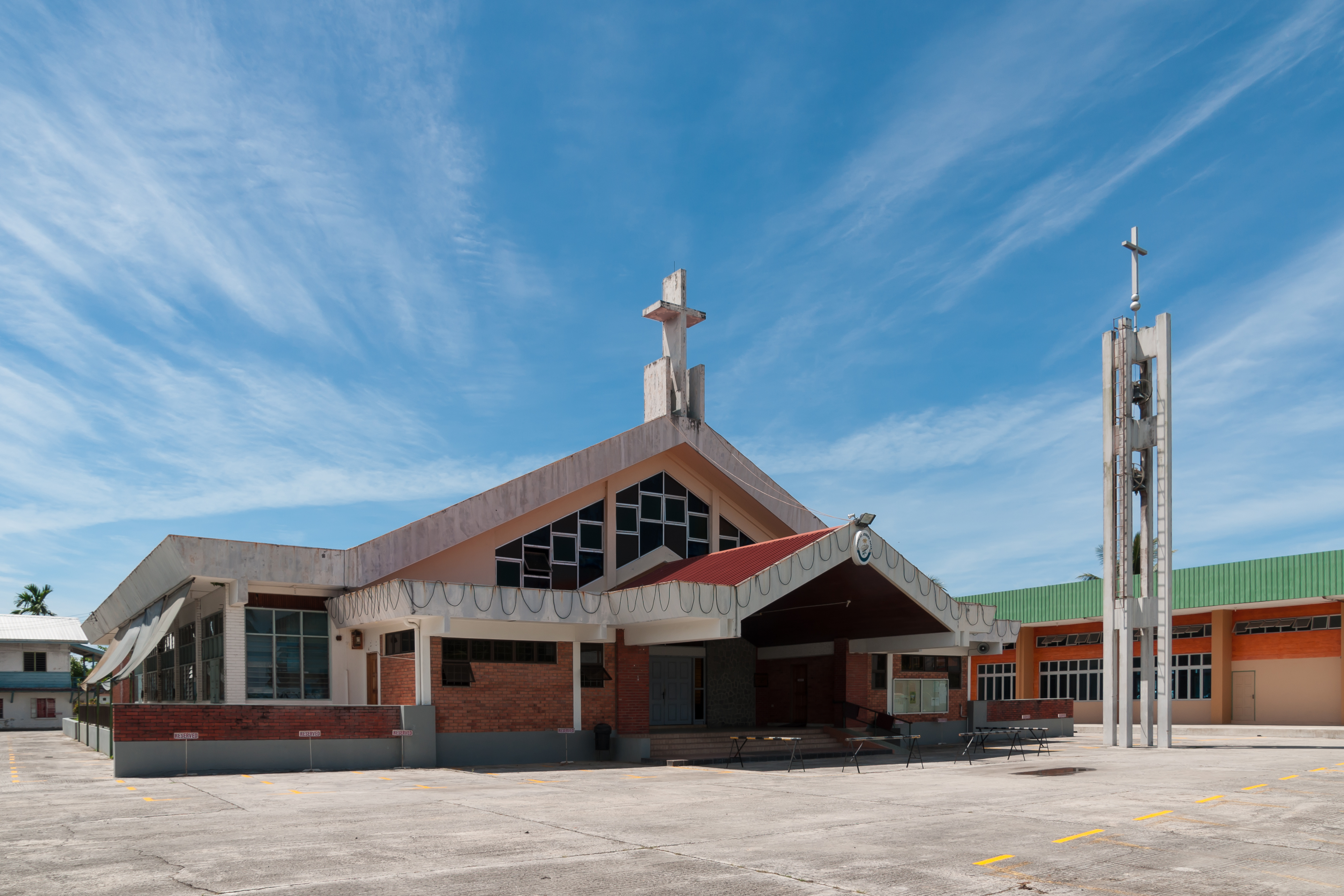
St. Joseph Catholic Church.

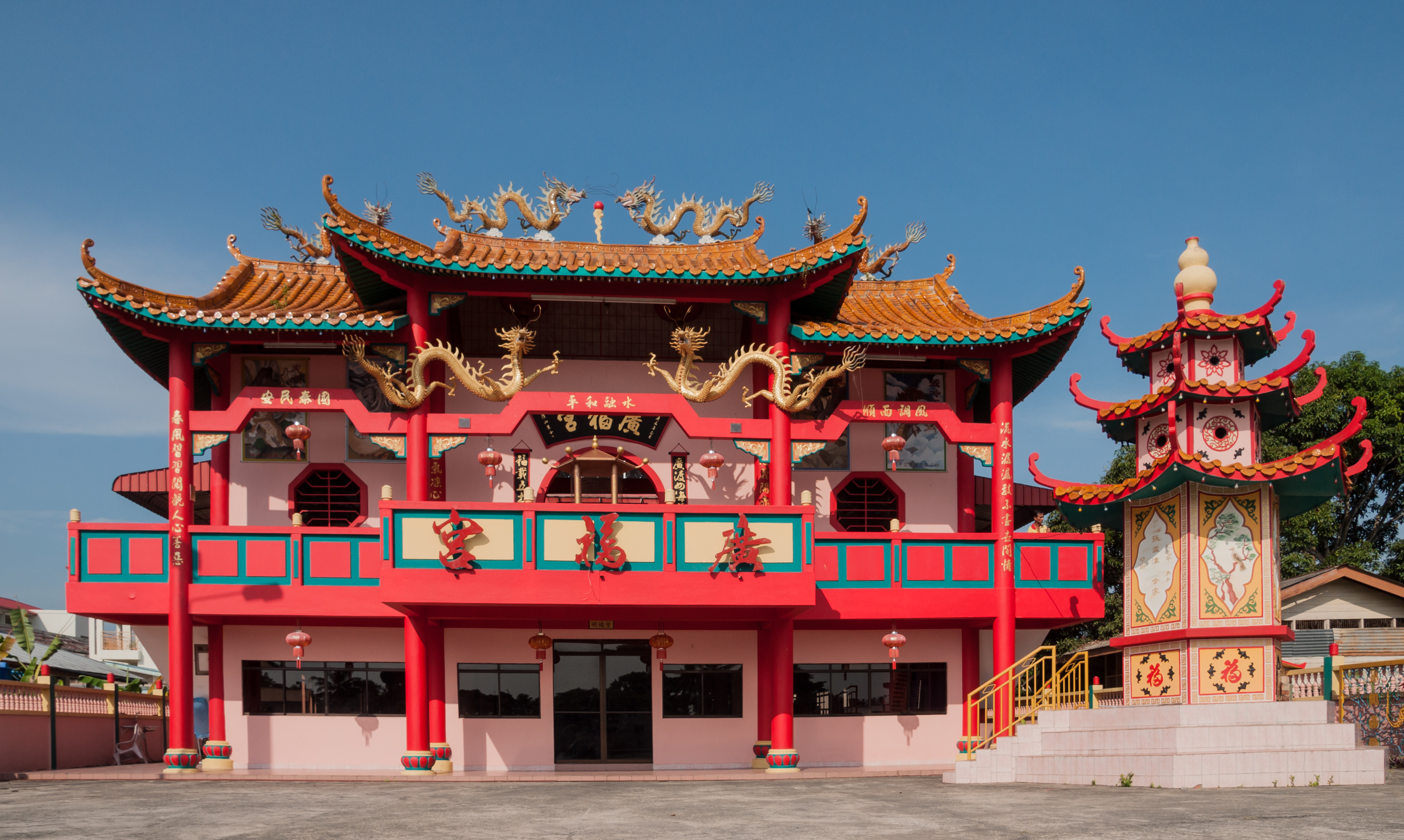
Kwong Fook Kung Temple.

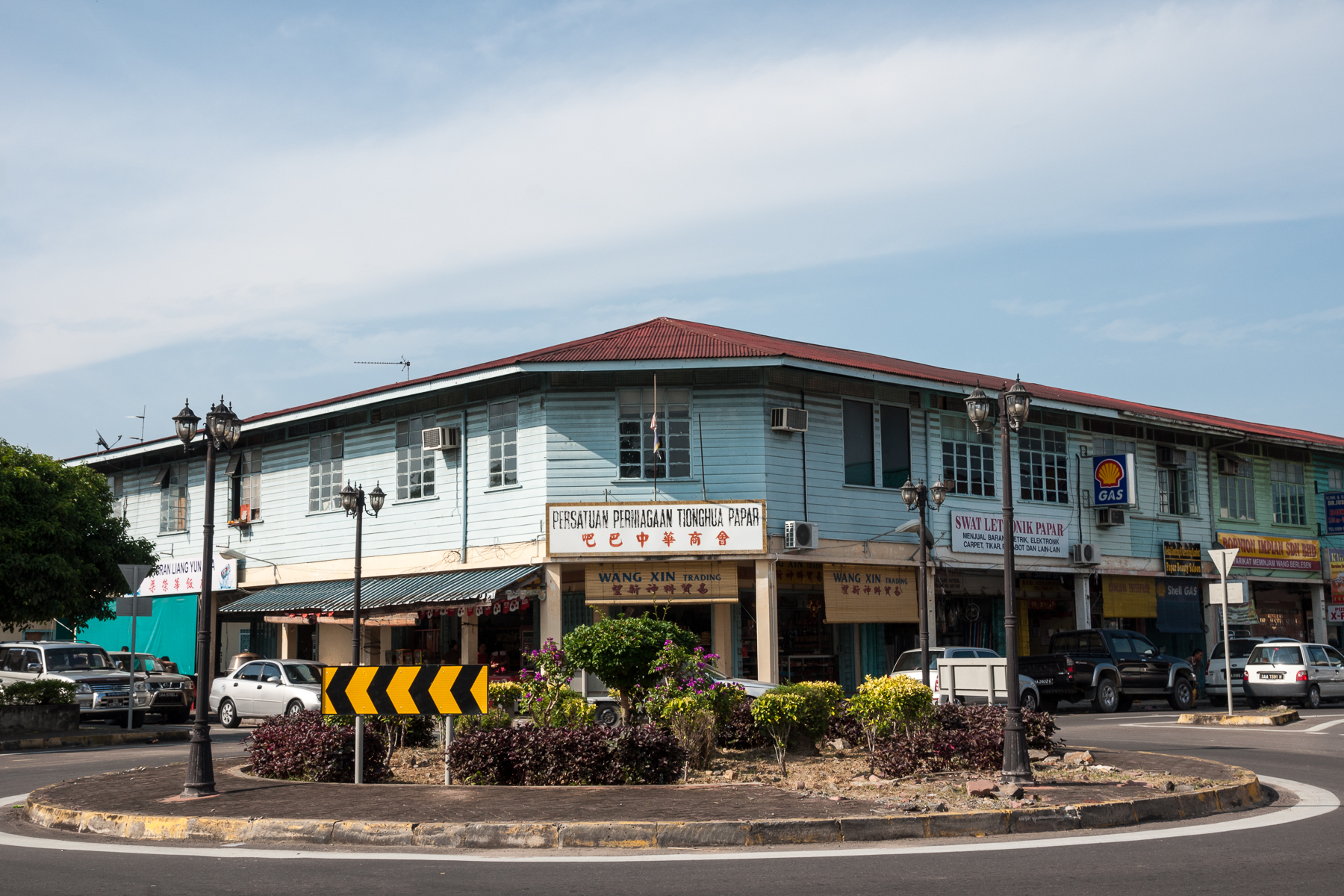
Papar town centre.

== See also ==
- Districts of Malaysia
