= Bangkuruan Island =

Island in Malaysia

- Interactive map of Bangkuruan Island

Geography
- Coordinates: 6°31′49″N 117°41′18″E

Administration
- Malaysia
- State: Sabah
- Division: Sandakan
- District: Beluran

Bangkuruan Island (Malay: Pulau Bangkuruan) is an island located near the Beluran district in Sabah, Malaysia. It has an area of approximately 1.8 hectares (4.4 acres; 0.018 km^{2}).

== See also ==
- List of islands of Malaysia
