= SMK Datuk Peter Mojuntin =

- SMK DPM

Location
- Jalan Datuk Peter Mojuntin, Kg. Guunsing/Hungab, 89507 Penampang; Sabah; Malaysia

Information
- Type: National secondary school
- Motto: Melangkah Dengan Gemilang
- Established: 27 February 1979
- School district: Penampang
- Principal: Harris Suffian Bali
- Teaching staff: 100+
- Form 1-5: Form 1- Harmoni, Amanah, Bersih, Cekap, Dedikasi, Efisien, Fasih, Gigih Form 2 – Harmoni, Amanah, Bersih, Cekap, Dedikasi, Efisien, Fasih, Gigih Form 3 – Harmoni, Amanah, Bersih, Cekap, Dedikasi, Efisien, Fasih, Gigih Form 4 – Science Stream (Harmoni), Sports Science (Amanah), Accounts/Rekacipta (Bersih), Geography (Cekap), Arts (Dedikasi), Arts (Efisien), Normal Class (Fasih), PVMA (Gigih) Form 5 – Science Stream (Harmoni), Sports Science (Amanah), Accounts/Rekacipta (Bersih), Geography (Cekap), Arts (Dedikasi), Arts (Efisien), Normal Class (Fasih), PVMA (Gigih)
- Enrollment: 1400+
- Houses: Red, Yellow, Blue, Green
- Student Union/Association: Majlis Perwakilan Murid, Pengawas, PRS, Majlis Ketua-Ketua Kelas, Pengawas Pusat Sumber
- Colours: Green, White, Blue, Yellow
- Yearbook: Citra
- Affiliation: Tallangatta Secondary College, Victoria, Australia
- Website: smkdpm.blogspot.com/

Sekolah Menengah Kebangsaan Datuk Peter Mojuntin (English: Datuk Peter Mojuntin National Secondary School; commonly known as SMK Datuk Peter Mojuntin or SMK DPM) is one of the secondary schools in Sabah which is located at Penampang, Kota Kinabalu, Malaysia. It is close to Sabah's capital city, Kota Kinabalu.

== History ==
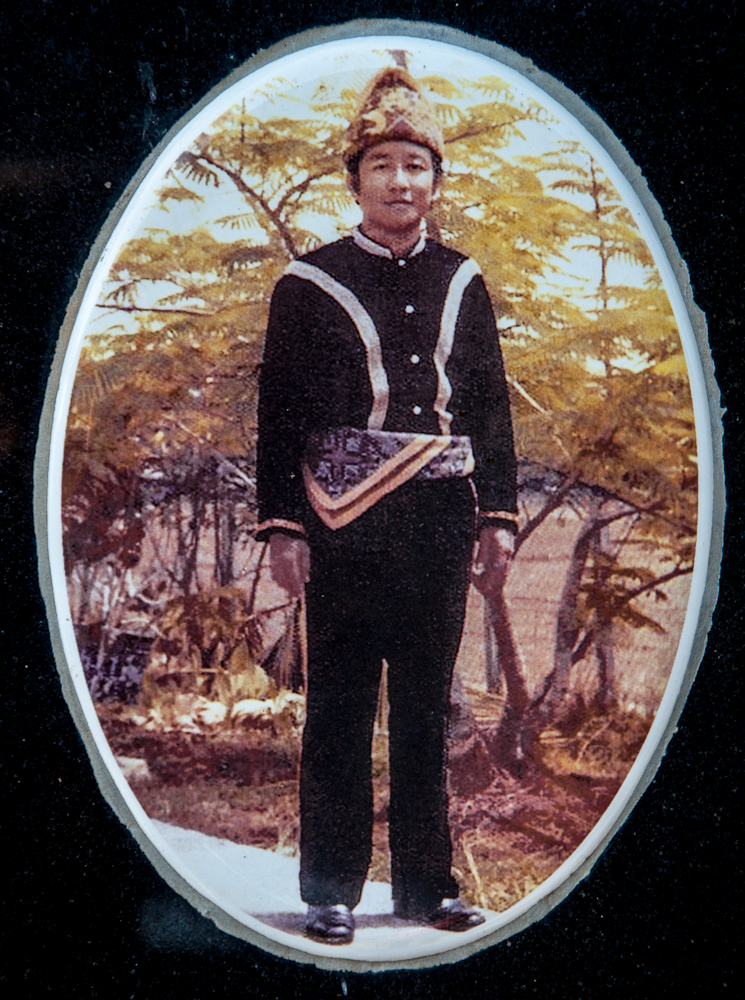
Datuk Peter Joinod Mojuntin, the 5th State Minister of Local Government and Housing, whom the school was named after.

The school was officially opened on 27 February 1979 by the then-Education Minister, Dato’ (now Tun) Musa Hitam, named after Datuk Peter Joinod Mojuntin, the 5th State Minister of Local Government and Housing, who was killed in June 1976 among with other Sabahan politicians due to a plane crash known as the Double Six Tragedy. He was a well-respected leader and was regarded as the Golden Son of the Kadazan.

A majority of the school's students are from Kadazandusun ethnic who come from the remote and semi-remote areas of Penampang district (Ulu Moyog/Ulu Papar region) like Buayan, Moyog, Babagon, Madsiang, Terian, Inobong, Tomposik, Putaton, Lutung, Timpoulon, Kibunut, Pongobonon, Timpangoh, Rugading, Longkogungan, Kolopis, Kipouvo, Kalanggaan, Sarapung and Pogunon as well as nearby villages within the school area such as Hungab, Babah/Bunduon, Hubah, Sukod (Suok/Kodundungan/Digot), Terawi, Guunsing/Novunsu, Mahandoi/Tulangis and many more within the Penampang region (from all villages on both halves of Penampang, Donggongon and Putatan, which are the nearest towns to this school).

SMK DPM has 3 central units - E-Management, Recreational School and Resource Centre Across School.

The E-Management is implemented to achieve a systematic management. The Information System used is the Students Information System, Discipline, Co-curricular, Fees, Attendance, NILAM, Audio Visual Aids, Information System for Malaysian Certificate of Education, Malaysian Higher certificate of education and Lower Secondary assessment (SPM, STPM and PMR (abolished; now PT3; also abolished)), Automation for the Resource Centre, Salary, Timetable and School Assessment System

Activities conducted by the Resource Centre of the school are:

- Focus Exhibition by every class.
- Mini library in each class.
- Corridors of information and knowledge.

The school building was repainted in stages which started in the year 2002 with the help and co-operation of the YB, community and the education department. A few buildings were erected namely the Open Hall, Squash Court, Hostel Dining Hall, Computer laboratory, the Grooming Room and the Rekacipta (Invention) Studio.
