= Bahang National Secondary School =

- Sekolah Menengah Kebangsaan Bahang

Location
- Jalan Penampang, 88200 Kota Kinabalu, Sabah; Malaysia; 5.92440°N 116.08846°E

Information
- Type: National secondary school
- Motto: Usaha Doa Jaya (Malay); Pray, Effort, and Success
- Established: 1994
- School district: Penampang
- Principal: Haji Mohamad Al-Beari Haji Binsin
- Staff: 120±
- Grades: Form 1 to Form 5 Special education
- Enrollment: 2000±
- Classes: Wawasan, Perdana, Bestari, Cemerlang, Dinamik, Dedikasi, Prihatin, Lestari, Kreatif, Harmoni
- Colours: Red; Yellow; Blue; Green; White
- Yearbook: Persada Bahang
- School code: XEA4128
- Postcode: 89507
- School song: Kami Anak Warisan
- Website: Official SMK Bahang Blog

Bahang National Secondary School (Malay: Sekolah Menengah Kebangsaan Bahang) is a secondary school in Sabah which is located at Penampang, between Donggongon Town and the city of Kota Kinabalu. The school is named after the village of Kampung Bahang, which is located near Kampung Koidupan and the KDCA (Kadazan Dusun Cultural Association). A majority of the students, including the staff, come from Penampang. Some of them however, are from Putatan, Luyang and even as far as from the central city of Sabah, Kota Kinabalu.

== History ==
SMK Bahang was established in December 1994 and was officially opened by the Prime Minister, Datuk Seri Mohd. Najib bin Tun Abdul Razak, who was then the Minister of Education Malaysia, with the motto "Together Realizing the Educational Excellence" (Bersama Merealisasikan Kecemerlangan Pendidikan). At the end of its of construction, the school had 24 classrooms.

On the opening day, six classrooms opened to accommodate 272 students from graduate students while a number of passed PMR students from other schools were placed here to further their studies in Form 4. In 1995, a special education class was established in January.

== Classrooms ==
Currently, SMK Bahang has 28 classrooms for the lower and upper secondary students, and four classrooms for special education. Each form has 10 classes that are named after nilai murni, or virtues. Students are arranged in their classrooms according to their grades and subjects.

As of 2024, SMK Bahang has been granted acceptance to implement the KRK (Kelas Rancangan Khas) program for students born in 2011 and later. However, the school has yet to commence the implementation process, as it is currently still accommodating more students for the program.

The list of classes, from top to bottom is: Wawasan, Perdana, Bestari, Cemerlang, Dinamik, Dedikasi, Prihatin, Lestari, Kreatif, and Harmoni.

As of 2024, the upper secondary students (Form 4 and Form 5) have 20 classrooms combined. The first 6 classes offers elective subjects while the other 4 classes follow the standard SPM syllabus.

As of June 2024, the principal has made initiatives for all Form 4 and Form 5 classes in 2025 to make Islamic Worldviews (Tasawwur Islam) and Visual Arts Education (Pendidikan Seni Visual) a mandatory subject. This is highly subject to change.

Wawasan:

- Additional Mathematics (Matematik Tambahan)
- Physics (Fizik)
- Chemistry (Kimia)
- Biology or Principles of Account (Biologi atau Prinsip Perakaunan)

Perdana:

- Business (Perniagaan)
- Computer Science (Sains Komputer)
- Home Science or Sports Science (Sains Rumah Tangga atau Science Sukan)

Bestari:

- Economy (Ekonomi)
- Sports Science or Agriculture (Sains Sukan atau Pertanian)
- Home Science or Computer Science (Sains Rumah Tangga atau Sains Komputer)

Cemerlang:

- Geography (Geografi)
- Visual Arts Education (Pendidikan Seni Visual)

Dinamik:

- Visual Arts Education or Islamic Worldviews (Pendidikan Seni Visual atau Tasawwur Islam)

Dedikasi:

- Visual Arts Education or Islamic Worldviews (Pendidikan Seni Visual atau Tasawwur Islam)

== Renovations and Infrastructure Upgrades ==
SMK Bahang has eight science labs; from Chemistry, Biology to Physics. There are two teacher's office. One located at Block A, and the other in Block C.

As of 2023, many renovations and new constructions were made by principal Haji Mohamad Al-Beari Haji Binsin, which are listed below:

- Renovations to the school hall.
- Renovations to the RBT workshop.
- Renovations to the school library.
- Repainting all the classrooms to white.
- Major repaint of the walls and floors of the school ground.
- Construction of a bengkel pastri (bakery).
- Construction of a makmal Sains Sukan (gym).
- Expansions to the parking lot.

Overall, many rooms were transferred to different blocks, such as the library to Block A.

As of 2024, the current principal Haji Mohamad Al-Beari Haji Binsin plans to renovate the school hall, as well as constructing a music room (bilik muzik).

== Fire of 31 December 2004 ==
On 31 December 2004, SMK Bahang had a tragedy where the highest floor of block A caught on fire. Prior to that, the school had another fire in 2002. This however, did not stop the school session of 2005. Computer labs, science labs and school canteens were used for teaching and learning process, even as far as starting their sessions 200 meters away in SK Bahang Penampang for Form 3.

== Former principals ==
From	Until	Principal name
1994	1994	Girlie Tan
1994	1997	Range Majikol
1997	1999	Haji Zainuddin bin Harun
1999	2004	Darman Shah Haji Asakil
2004	2004	Masly Wahip
2004	2007	A. Junaidah binti Yusuppu
2007	2009	Haji Bolong @ Mohammad Darwis bin Haji Cholle
2009	2014	Clari @ Clare Datuk Valentine Sikodol
2014	2016	Dennis Gompion
2016	2018	Ganasan Ramasamy
2018	2023	Margaret Chee
2023	Present	Haji Mohamad Al-Beari bin Haji Binsin
