= La Salle Secondary School, Kota Kinabalu =

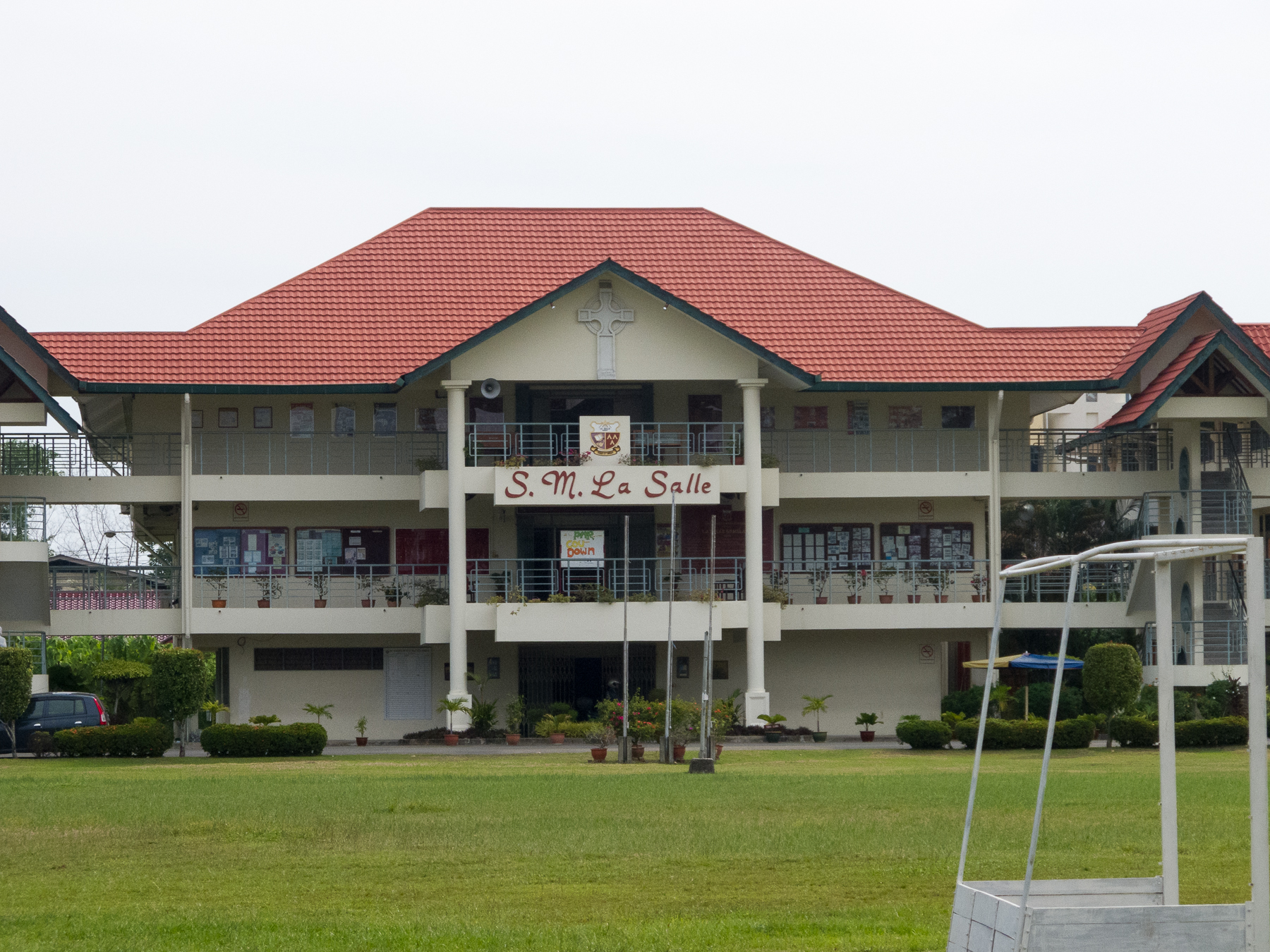
- SM La Salle, Kota Kinabalu

Location
- Murni Road, Tanjung Aru, Kota Kinabalu, Sabah; Malaysia
- Coordinates: 5.9530°N 116.0523°E

Information
- Other name: SMLS
- Type: Government-aided secondary school
- Motto: Fides et Opera (By Faith and Deeds)
- Established: 1953
- Authority: Kota Kinabalu District Education Office
- Oversight: Roman Catholic Archdiocese of Kota Kinabalu
- Principal: Mr. Vijayakumar Arumugam
- Grades: Form 1 to Form 5 and Pre-U (Lower and Upper 6)
- Enrollment: Roughly 1,070 students
- Classrooms: Junior Block: Vega, Rigel, Capella, Procyon, Agena; Senior Block: Science, Business, Technology, Arts-1, Arts-2
- Colours: Davies (Purple), Raphael (Red), Crowther (Yellow), Brendan (Green), Charles (Blue)
- Affiliation: La Sallian Educational Institutions
- Yearbook: La Sallian
- Website: www.lasalle.edu.my

La Salle Secondary School, Kota Kinabalu (Malay: Sekolah Menengah La Salle Kota Kinabalu) is a co-educational secondary school for boys and girls (mostly boys) and one of the oldest schools in Kota Kinabalu on the coast of Borneo in East Malaysia.

It was established in 1953 by Rev. Fr. Bernard Davies, a Mill Hill Missionary. Despite being an all-boys mission school, the students consist of all races regardless of religion.

The school is divided into two pieces of land. The Senior Block (Forms 4 to 6), that has been renovated since 2014, remains at its current location while its long-standing Junior Block (Forms 1 to 3) has been relocated to the new ground to accommodate the increase in student enrolment.

This single-session secondary school is located in Tanjung Aru and it is a few minutes walk from Pekan Tanjung Aru township. Next to the Senior Block is SM Stella Maris, an all-girls Catholic school under the oversight of the nearest area Catholic parish, Stella Maris, since this school is under the Sacred Heart Cathedral parish albeit located in the same area.

== History ==
La Salle Secondary School Kota Kinabalu was established in July 1903 as Sacred Heart Primary School by Father Van Der Heyden. By June 1913, the school had around 50 students which increased to 215 by the year 1923. Between 1941 and 1945, a wooden school building with eight classes was built on the site where the current Sacred Heart Primary School stands.

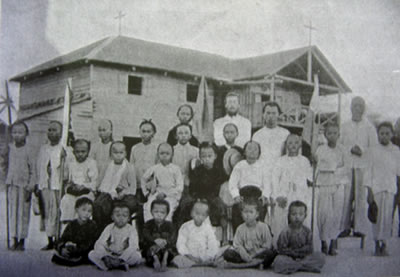
Father Van Der Heyden

In the early 1950s, the Catholic Mission started the Sacred Heart secondary school and Father Bernard Davies who served as its first principal. In 1953, the Catholic Mission obtained 3 hectares of land in Tanjung Aru and moved the school to its present location.

By 1958, the La Salle Brothers took over the management of the school with Brother Raphael Egan being the first principal. On 22 May 1958, Sacred Heart Secondary School was subsequently renamed La Salle Secondary School. This name was derived from the founder, Jean Baptiste de La Salle.

The school is affiliated to other Lasallian educational institutions in Malaysia.

== Principals ==
- Rev. Fr. Bernard Davies, M.H.M. (1953–1955)
- Rev. Fr. Arthur Crowther, M.H.M. (1955–1958)
- Bro. Raphael Egan, FSC (1958–1966)
- Bro. Brendan Dunne, FSC (1966–1968)
- Bro. Datuk Charles Michael O’Leary, FSC, PGDK (1968–1985)
- Mr. Stanley Liew Hyuk Hiong (1986–1999)
- Dr. Edward Miku Tionsu (2000–2003)
- Mdm. Katherine Philip (2004–2006)
- Mdm. Julia Willie Jock, ADK, ASDK (2006–2017)
- Mdm. Mary Macdalena A. Komuji (2017–2022)
- Mr. Vijayakumar Arumugam (2022–present)

== Notable alumni ==
- Bernard Dompok – former state chief minister
- James Wong – former Malaysian footballer
- Peter Mojuntin – late former state cabinet Minister who perished in the Double Six Crash
- John Lee – Emeritus Archbishop of the Archdiocese of Kota Kinabalu
- Richard Malanjum – Chief Justice of Malaysia from 2018 to 2019
- Salleh Sulong – late former state cabinet Minister who was also a victim of the Double Six Crash
- Donald Peter Mojuntin – former state cabinet Assistant Minister and Deputy President of the United Progressive Kinabalu Organisation since 2018
- Peter Rajah – former Malaysian goalkeeper
- Joseph Pairin Kitingan – former Chief Minister of Sabah
- Ahmadshah Abdullah – State Governor from 2003 to 2010
- Lee Wai Ming – former Malaysia rugby player
- Nestor Majin – former Malaysia rugby player
- Frankie Joilin – former Malaysia rugby Player
- Farish A. Noor – Malaysian academician, historian and political scientist

== See also ==
- List of schools in Sabah
- Lists of schools in Malaysia
