= SMKA Kota Kinabalu =

Kota Kinabalu Islamic High School
- Sekolah Menengah Kebangsaan Agama Kota Kinabalu

Location
- Jalan Sekolah Agama Kota Kinabalu, Bukit Padang; Kota Kinabalu, Sabah, 88300; Malaysia
- Coordinates: 5.9558°N 116.1095°E

Information
- School type: Government Boarding national religious secondary school
- Motto: Berilmu, Beriman, Beramal (Learning, Believing and Practicing)
- Religious affiliation: Islam
- Established: 1 January 1991
- Founder: Haidon Hadi Sapiri
- Status: Open
- Supervising body: State Education Department
- School code: XRA 4003
- Principal: Datin Hasnah Mohd. Yakob
- Grades: Form 1 to Upper Form 6
- Gender: Male and female
- Age range: 13–19
- Enrollment: 520 (2016)
- Classes offered: General knowledge, Islamic study, Science, Engineering and Accountancy
- Schedule type: Schedule
- Schedule: Normal schedule: 7.00 am - 1.00 pm Additional schedule: 2.00 pm - 4.00 pm
- Hours in school day: 6-8
- Classrooms: 24
- Houses: 4
- Nickname: SMKAKK
- Yearbook: Al-Qudwah
- Website: smkakk.bpi.edu.my

Kota Kinabalu Islamic High School (Malay: Sekolah Menengah Kebangsaan Agama Kota Kinabalu) (SMKAKK) is an Islamic schools in Kota Kinabalu. The school was formerly known as Sekolah Menengah Agama Kota Kinabalu or SMAKK.

== History ==
SMKA Kota Kinabalu was established on 1 December 1990. That year, the Founding Principal, Haidon Hadi Sapiri, named the school after the district where this school is situated. The school is located in Bukit Padang and, until the end of 2015, beside Sabah Science Secondary School. The school campus was originally the Sabah Campus of National University of Malaysia established in 1979 and dissolved years later.

Establishment of this school was intended by the Sabah State Education Director in order to increase the number of Islamic schools in Sabah. Originally, the school had 11 teachers, one clerk and 205 students of Form 1 and Form 4.

On 12 April 2011, SMKA Kota Kinabalu became a School Without Litter through a proclamation issued by Kota Kinabalu City Hall. In 2016, SMKA Kota Kinabalu becomes an SMKA with the status of Maahad Tahfiz (school of al-Quran memorisation) and, thus, offers Tahfiz programme to students.

== See also ==
- SMKA
