= SMK Matunggong, Kudat =

Sekolah Menengah Kebangsaan Matunggong
- Sabah; Malaysia

Information
- Type: National Secondary School
- Motto: Ilmu Iman Amal
- Established: 2004
- School district: Kudat
- School code: XEA5024
- Principal: Vasuthevan a/l S.Palanivulu

SMK Matunggong (Malay: Sekolah Menengah Kebangsaan Matunggong, Kudat) is a latest secondary school in Kudat, Sabah which was established in 2004. SMK Matunggong is located at Matunggong, Kudat and has a neighbour secondary school: SMK Pinawantai which only separated by a few kilometres.

== History ==
SMK Matunggong has been constructed on the site of 20 acres of land. The location of the school area is hilly in which it has been adjusted. It Is located about 500 meter from Matunggong town, 39 kilometres from Kota Marudu, 45 kilometres from Kudat and 195 kilometres from the city of Kota Kinabalu

This school has seven three-storey school block unit, a unit of administrative office, a canteen, 2 units of students' hostels, 24 units of houses for teachers.

The school construction was completed in early May 2003. However, this school is officially opened on 5 January 2004. The students who enroll as first-generation students of this school is Form One. Around 85% of these students come from a small area of Matunggong. Form Four students sign up for the second group of students of this school a week after the PMR results were announced.

As the school operating, the number of students is 356. 276 for Form One students' and 80 for Form Four students'. In the beginning, the school is operated by three persons, a coordinator and two assistants. Then, nine teachers are added and two non-teaching staffs.

Until the end of 2005, a total of 10 classrooms for teaching and learning has been used. Seven classrooms for Form One, two classrooms for the arts and a classroom for pure science. Number of teachers increased to 20 people (11 men and 9 women), five non-teaching staffs and the total number of students of 360 people.

== Principals ==
Name	From	To
Rosmih Jamari @ Jamal	2004	2009
Ramnan Saidun	2009	2014
Vasuthevan a/l S.Palanivulu	2014	present
