= SMS Sabah =

Sabah Science Secondary School
- Sekolah Menengah Sains Sabah

Location
- SABAH SCIENCE SECONDARY SCHOOL LOCKED BAG 116, 88999, KOTA KINABALU, SABAH, MALAYSIA. KOTA KINABALU, Sabah, 88999; Malaysia; 5.9583°N 116.1095°E

Information
- Other name: SMESH (abbreviation)
- Former name: Sekolah Berasrama Penuh Sabah
- School type: Fully Residential School; High Performance School
- Motto: Teguh, Setia, Budi ("Strength, Loyalty, Morality")
- Established: 1 January 1984
- Status: Open
- School code: XEA 4039
- Principal: Rokiah binti Abdullah
- Staff: 55 (academic); 20 (non-academic)
- Grades: Form 1 to Form 5
- Enrolment: 583 (2022)
- Classes: 4 (Alpha, Beta, Cygma and DLP (Dual Language Programme)) for each Form
- Classes offered: General knowledge and science
- Language: Malay, English, Arabic, Japanese, French and Mandarin
- Houses: Tun Ahmad Raffae; Tun Datu Mustapha; Tun Said Keruak; Tun Fuad Stephens
- Yearbook: SASILA
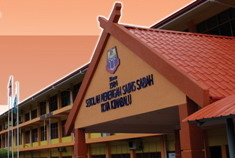
- Front entrance of the school

Sekolah Menengah Sains Sabah (English: Sabah Science Secondary School; abbreviated SMESH) is a fully residential school established in Malaysian state of Sabah. As the first fully residential school in East Malaysia and the 27th of its kind in Malaysia, SMESH was previously known as Sekolah Berasrama Penuh Sabah (SBPS). SMESH was established in 1978 but became fully operational on 1 January 1984. It has a 16-acre (65,000 m^{2}) permanent campus in Bukit Padang, Kota Kinabalu. Due to the unsafe state of the campus, SMESH is temporarily operated in a temporary campus in Tuaran.

== History ==
The idea of having a fully residential school in Sabah was initiated in 1970s. Although SBPS was established in 1978, SBPS started its operation on 1 January 1984 under the leadership of its Founding Principal, Mohd. Radzwan Mohd. Yusof with the assistance of one teacher, Abd Halim Ismail. The first group of SBPS students were enrolled on 26 May 1984. SBPS was renamed as SMESH by the Ministry of Education (MOE) on 12 April 1997. Prior to 2011, SMESH was made a Smart School and a Cluster of Excellence School.

On 26 May 2011, Education Minister Muhyiddin Yassin declared SMESH a High Performance School. As such, SMESH was given considerable autonomy powers from MOE. For many years, including in 2018, SMESH was ranked the best secondary school in Sabah based on public examination results achieved by students and the school. In 2014, SMESH became the second best school in Malaysia based on Malaysian Certificate of Education (SPM) 2013 results.

In 2015, Ministry of Works declared the permanent campus of SMESH in Kota Kinabalu unsafe. Consequently, SMESH was relocated to Tuaran. The old campus of Kent Teaching Education Institute was set up as the temporary campus of SMESH at the end of 2015.

In March 2018, Education Minister Mahdzir Khalid announced that RM 72 million was provided rebuild the permanent campus under Najib Government. Assistant Minister of State Jimmy Wong later revealed, in July 2018, that the real cost of rebuilding the permanent campus is RM 74.2 million and that the project is still at pre-implementation level.

In July 2018, SMESH was selected as the second school in Malaysia and the first in Sabah to go cashless by MobilityOne.

== Leadership ==
SMESH is led by a senior-grade Principal appointed by MOE. He is later assisted by a Management Council comprising all three Vice Principals and four Head of Departments.

Since the inception of SBPS/SMESH in 1984, six Principals took the helm of the school. Zaini Zair is the Principal of SMESH since 2008. The following principals preceded him were:

- 1984–1987: Mohd. Radzwan Mohd. Yusof
- 1987–1994: Adnan Ibrahim
- 1994-1996 : Ibrahim Hj Ahmad
- 1996–1997: Abbas Awang
- 1997–2005: Wahid Kapal
- 2005–2008: Rossminah Yamin
- 2008–2022: Zaini bin Zair
- 2023~: Rokiah binti Abdullah

== Achievements ==
Since 1984, SMESH has recorded numerous achievements at various fields and levels. In academic, SMESH was made the best school in Sabah for 2018 based on SPM 2017 results. In co-curricular activities, SMESH has been the top school in district-level Interschool Sports Championship. SMESH also received a gold medal in Fully Residential School International Symposium, the recent being in 2018. In administration and finance, SMESH was given a clean audit by the Auditor General.

== Alumni ==
Since 1984, SMESH has produced hundreds of notable alumni. One of them has been Isnaraissah Munirah Majilis who is Member of Parliament for Kota Belud and Deputy Minister of Energy, Technology, Science, Climate Change and Environment since 2018.

SMESH Kota Kinabalu

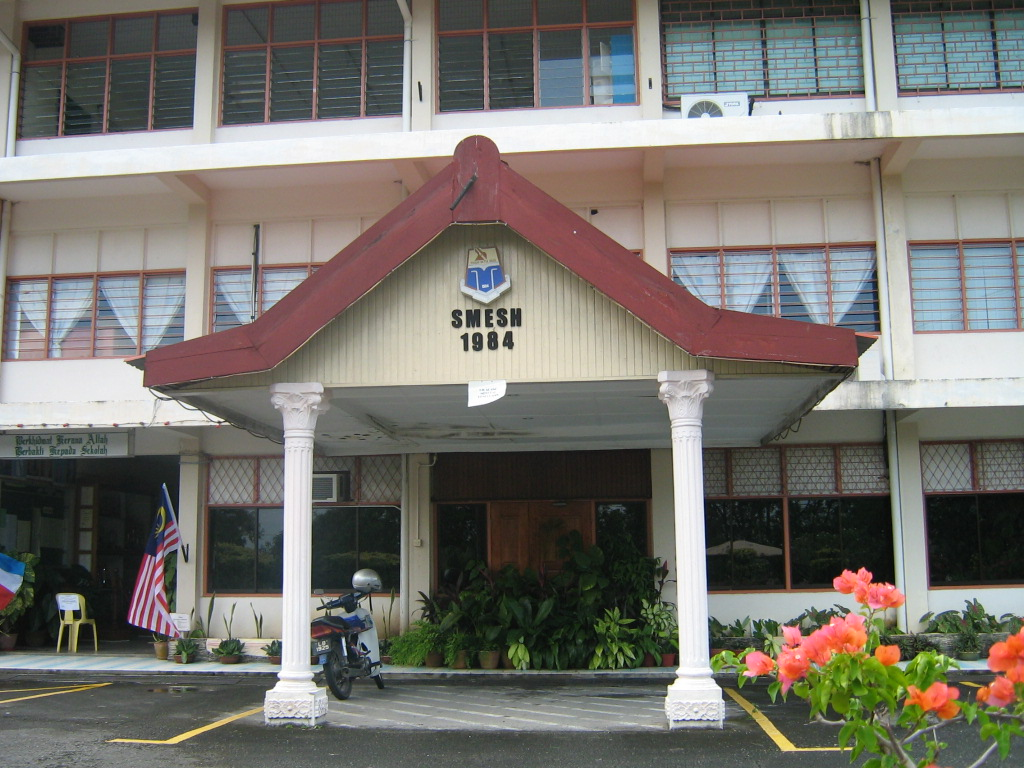
Old front entrance

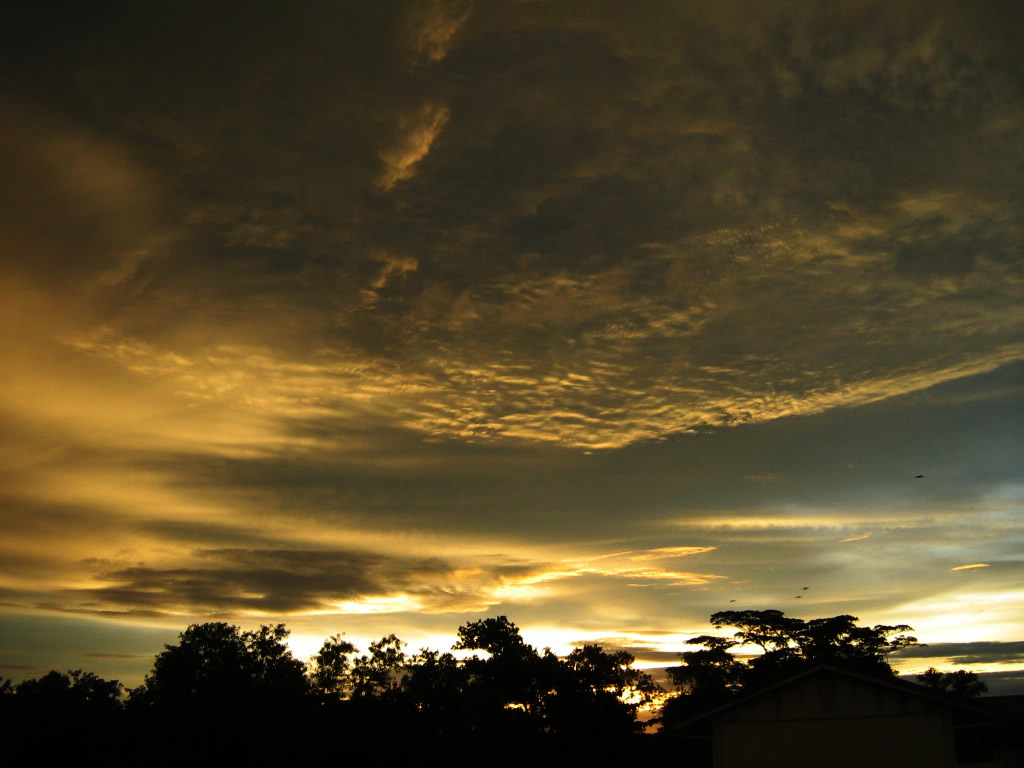
Sceneric view from Boys' hostel during dusk

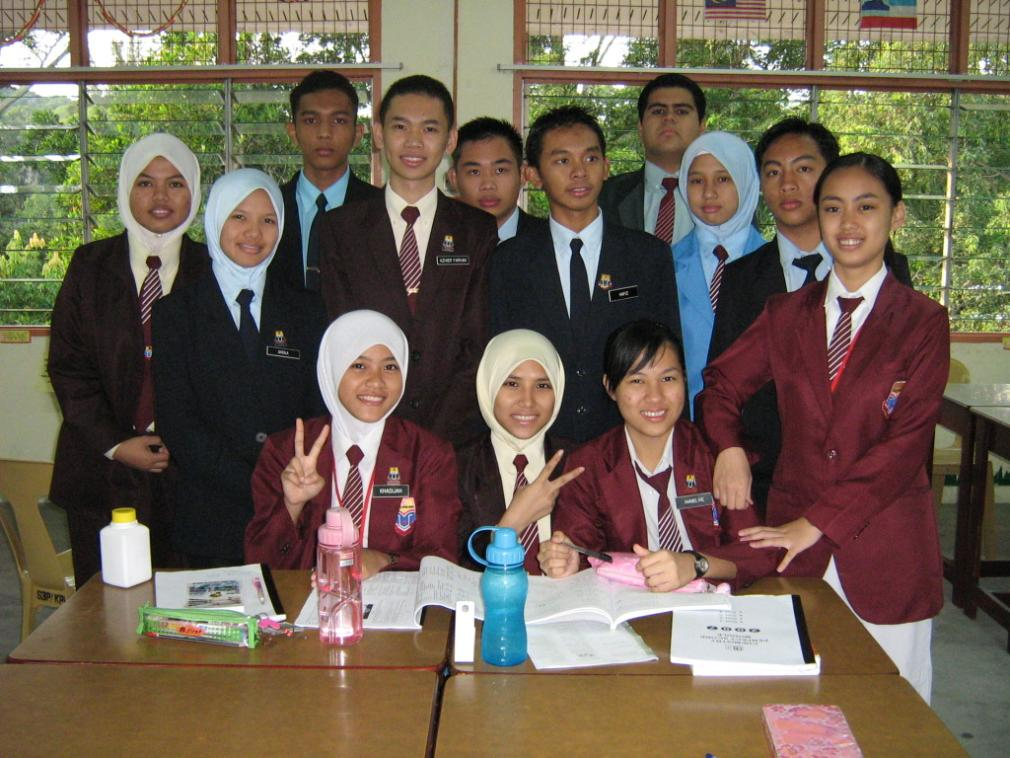
School's official uniform

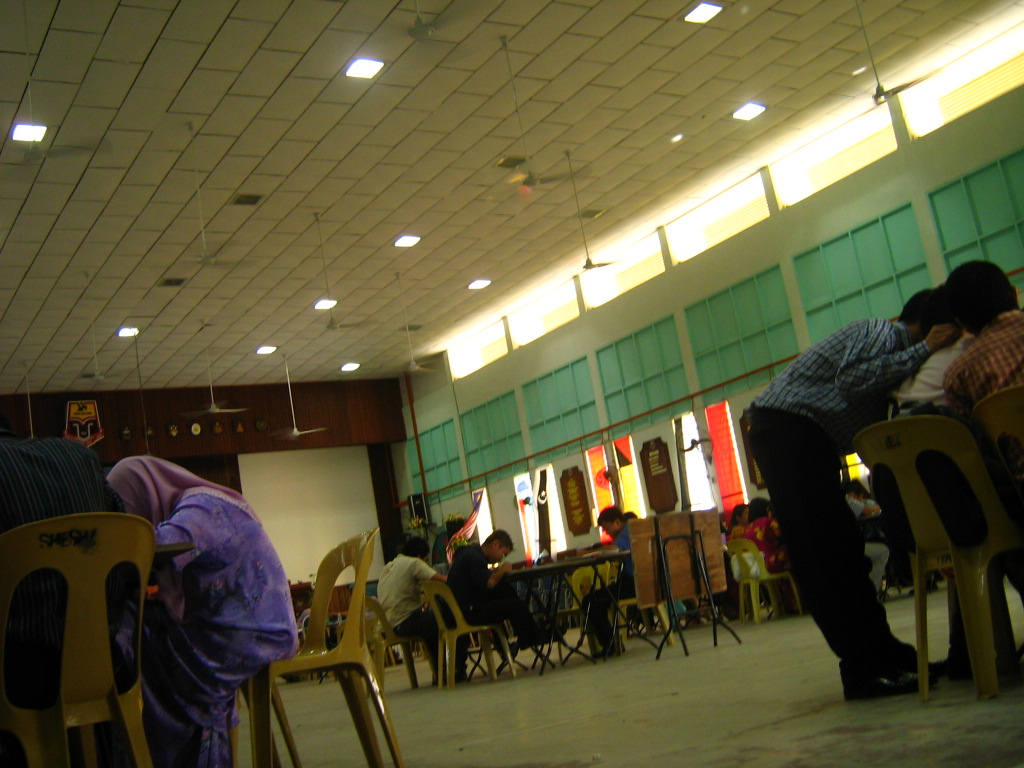
Group discussion in Sri Kinabalu Hall
