= SMK Majakir Papar =

Coordinates: 5°43′55″N 115°55′35″E

SMK Majakir

Location
- PO. BOX 110, 89608; Papar, Sabah; Malaysia

Information
- Type: Secondary School
- Motto: Kebijaksanaan Nilai Kemanusiaan
- Established: 1962
- School district: Papar
- Session: One session
- Principal: Pn. Zuraidah Binti Salleh
- Grades: Form 1 – Form 6
- Language: Malay language, English, Arabic
- Area: Papar, Malaysia
- Yearbook: Penghubung
- Information: Tel : 088-913554; Fax : 088-915494
- Website: www.majakir.net
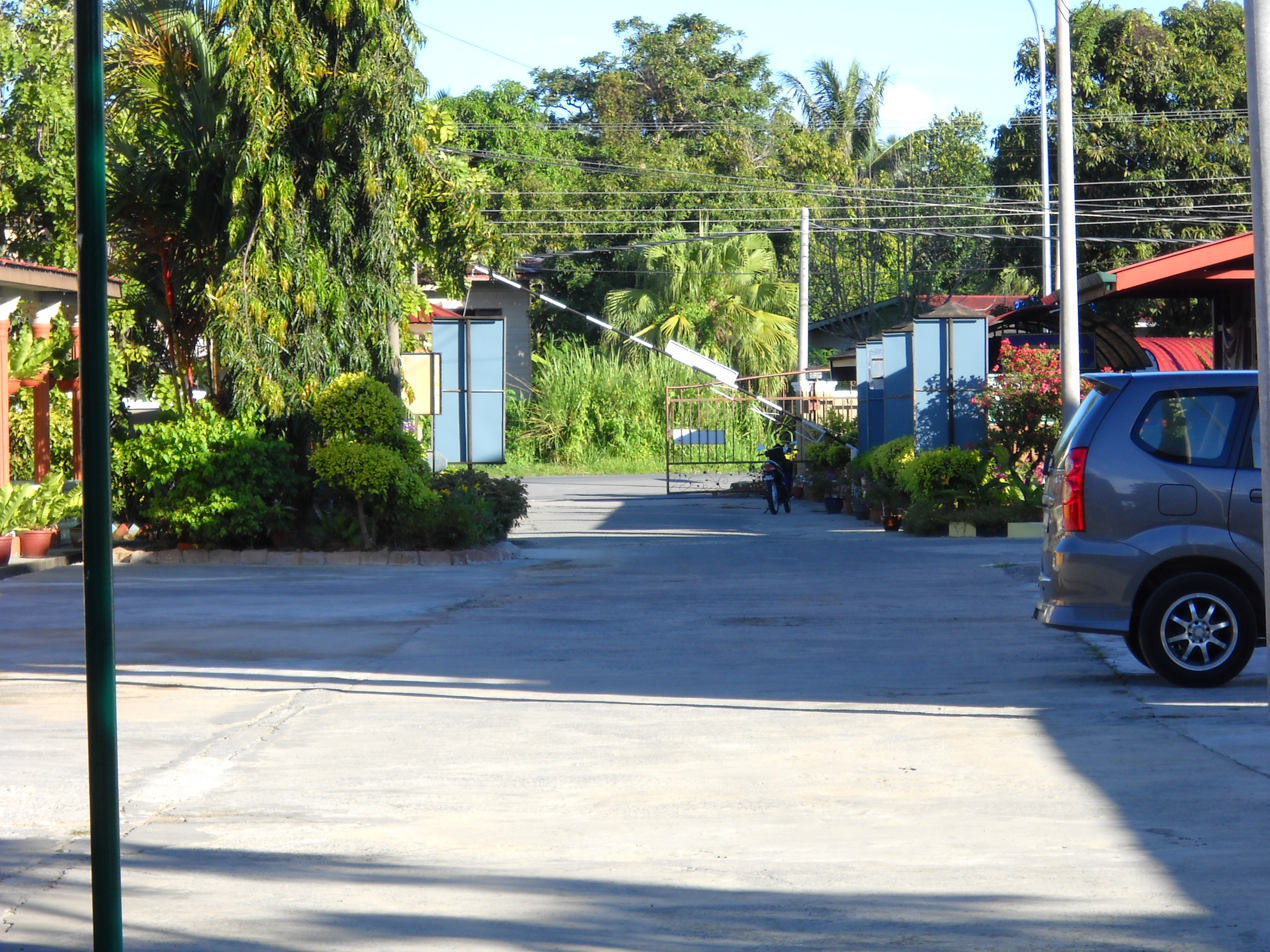
- The entrance of the school

SMK Majakir Papar also known as Sekolah Menengah Kebangsaan Majakir Papar (SMKMP) in Malay, is a Malaysian secondary school in East Malaysia established in 1962.

== History ==
In 1962, the school was established with as Government Junior Secondary School (GJSS) and had only 45 students who studied in Bridge 1 and two teachers. At that time GJSS borrow Sains Rumah Tangga Sekolah Rendah Kerajaan Pekan Papar room and school principals at that time was Mr. John Ganai.

By the year 1963, the school had to borrow Cheng Hwa School classroom and study time only in the afternoon only. There was only Bridge 1 and 2 only with the five teachers under the administration of Mrs. Ausan, followed by Lim Hsing Hui as a principal after that. Then borrow the school classroom in St. Joseph was to accommodate pupils from Bridge 1, 2 and Secondary I and II.

In 1966, the school building was completed and officially opened by Tun Mustapha. There are only four building blocks and a hall. But the school still borrow classrooms Cheng Hwa School and St. Joseph school. In this year the school was the first time following the Sabah Junior Certificate Examination. Decision is quite encouraging.

Dated 1 August 1975, the school name was changed to Sekolah Menengah Kebangsaan Majakir Papar based on the name of District Chief in that time OKK Mohd Zakir B. Awang.

== List of principals ==
Period of service	Name of principal
1963–1964	Mr. John Ganai
1965–1968	Mr. Lim Hsing Hui
1969–1972	Mr. P.M. John
1973–1978	Mr. Albert S.K. Chia
June 1978 – December 1979	Mr. Richard F. Tunggolou
1980–1988	Mr. Zakaria Jap
1989 – August 1995	Datuk Normah Gagoh
September 1995 – February 2000	Mr. Hj. Ag. Matussin B. Hj. Pg. Ahmad
June 2000 – October 2001	Mdm. Sherfah Fatimah Hayati Ismail
October 2001 – February 2002	Mdm. Salmah Abdullah
February 2002 – April 2007	Mdm. Jarah Abdullah Gad
April 2007 – December 2009	Mr. Loh Kok Cheang
December 2009 – September 2023	Mr. Hj. Abdul Aziz Mohamed Zain
September 2023 - present	Mdm. Zuraidah binti Salleh

== School Song ==
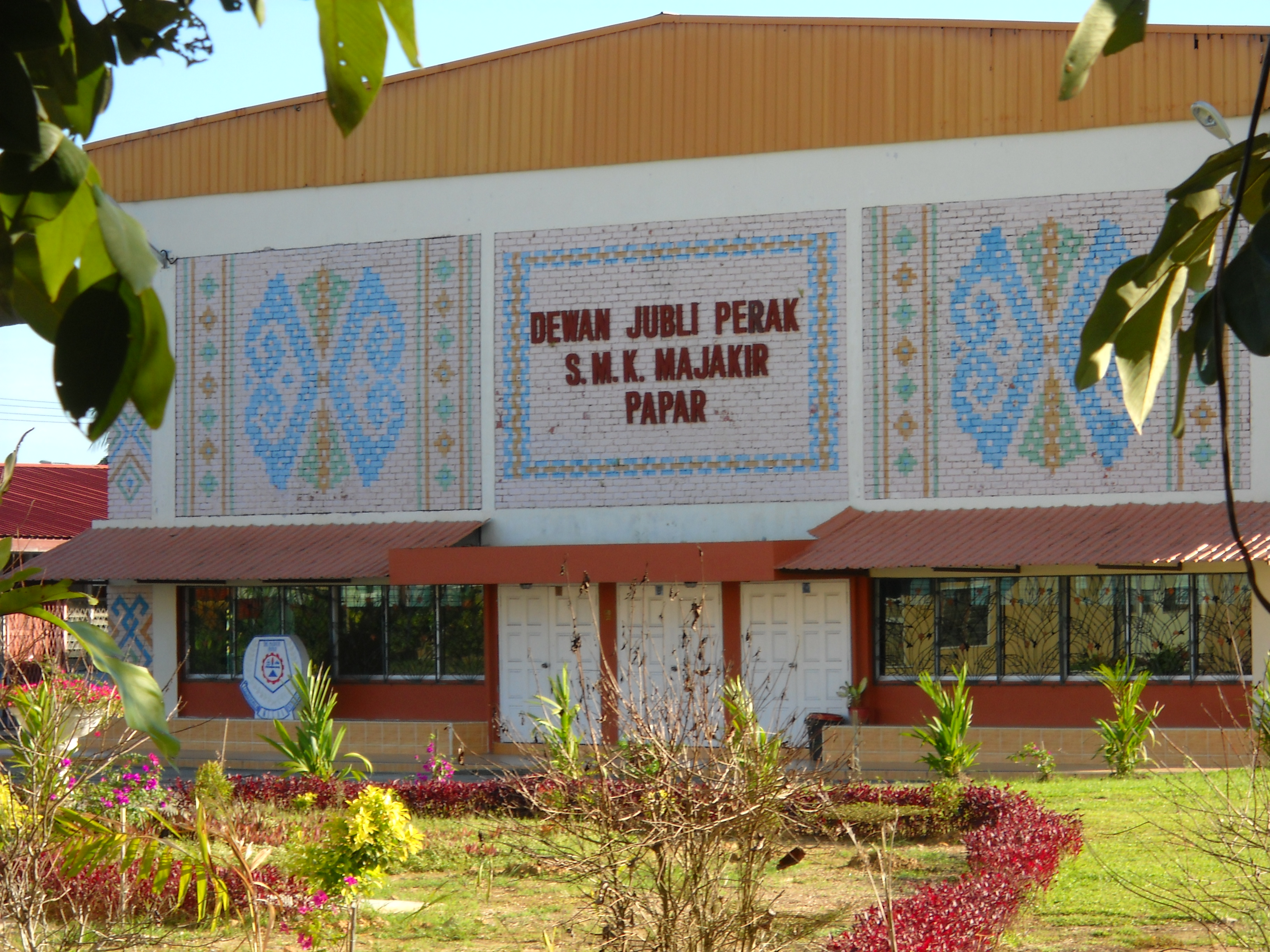
SMK Majakir Silver Jubilee Hall.

Di bawah lambang yang satu,
Belajar hidup untuk berjasa,
Ilmu pengetahuan ditambah,
Kebijaksanaan nilai kita.

Usaha jamin kejayaan,
Teguh sabar di semua bidang,
Imej sekolah tetap dijaga,
Sekolah Majakir maju jaya.

Marilah kita bersama-sama berjuang,
Membina masa depan yang gemilang,
Taat setia dan kejujuran,
Demi perpaduan bangsa.

=== English translation ===
Under the sign of one,
Learn to live for meritorious,
Increased knowledge,
The wisdom of our values.

Efforts guarantee success,
Robust forward in all areas,
Maintained a secular image,
Let's aspire our dearest school.

Let us jointly fight,
Building a brighter future,
Loyalty and honesty,
By the unity of the nation.(in Malay)

== School Magazines ==
The last school magazines were created is Penghubung, created in 2009.
