= Beluran =

Beluran Town Pekan Beluran
- Town and district capital
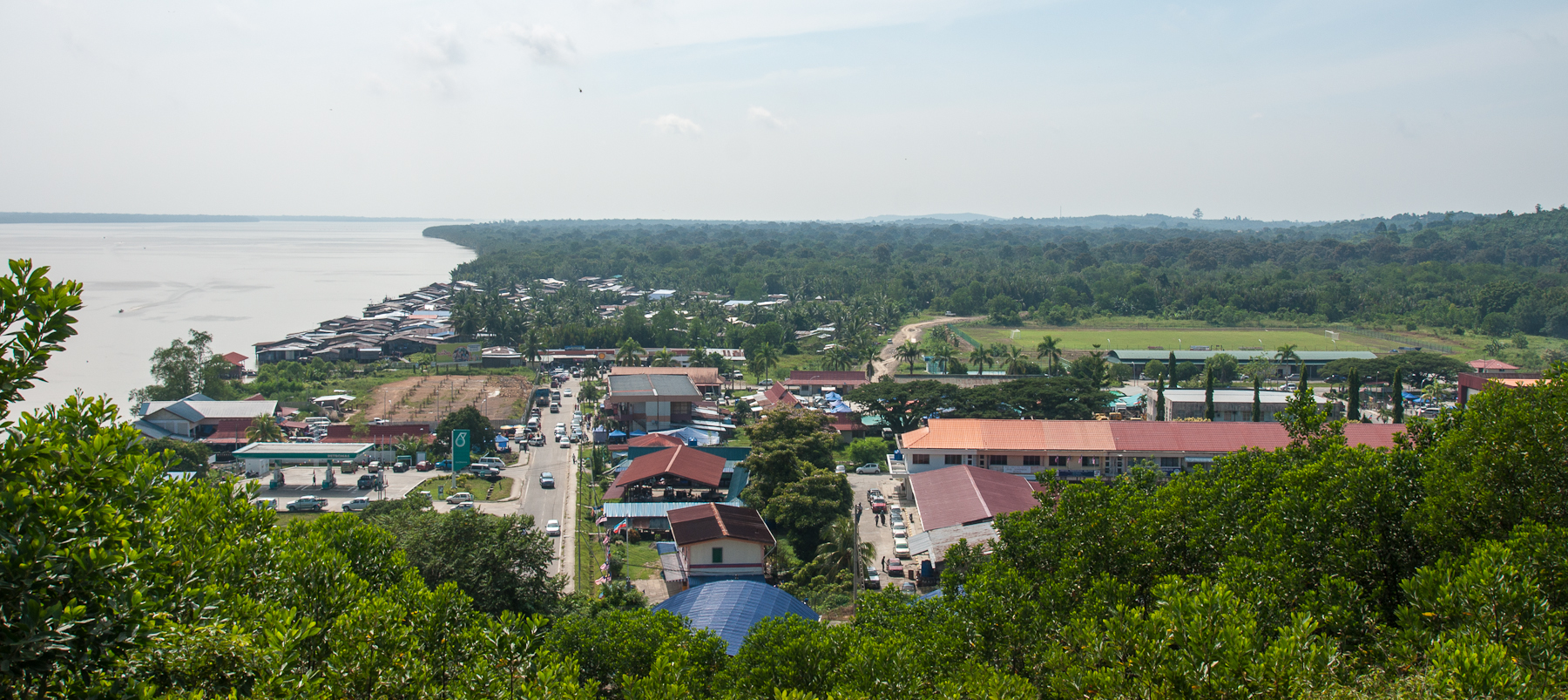
- Beluran town centre.

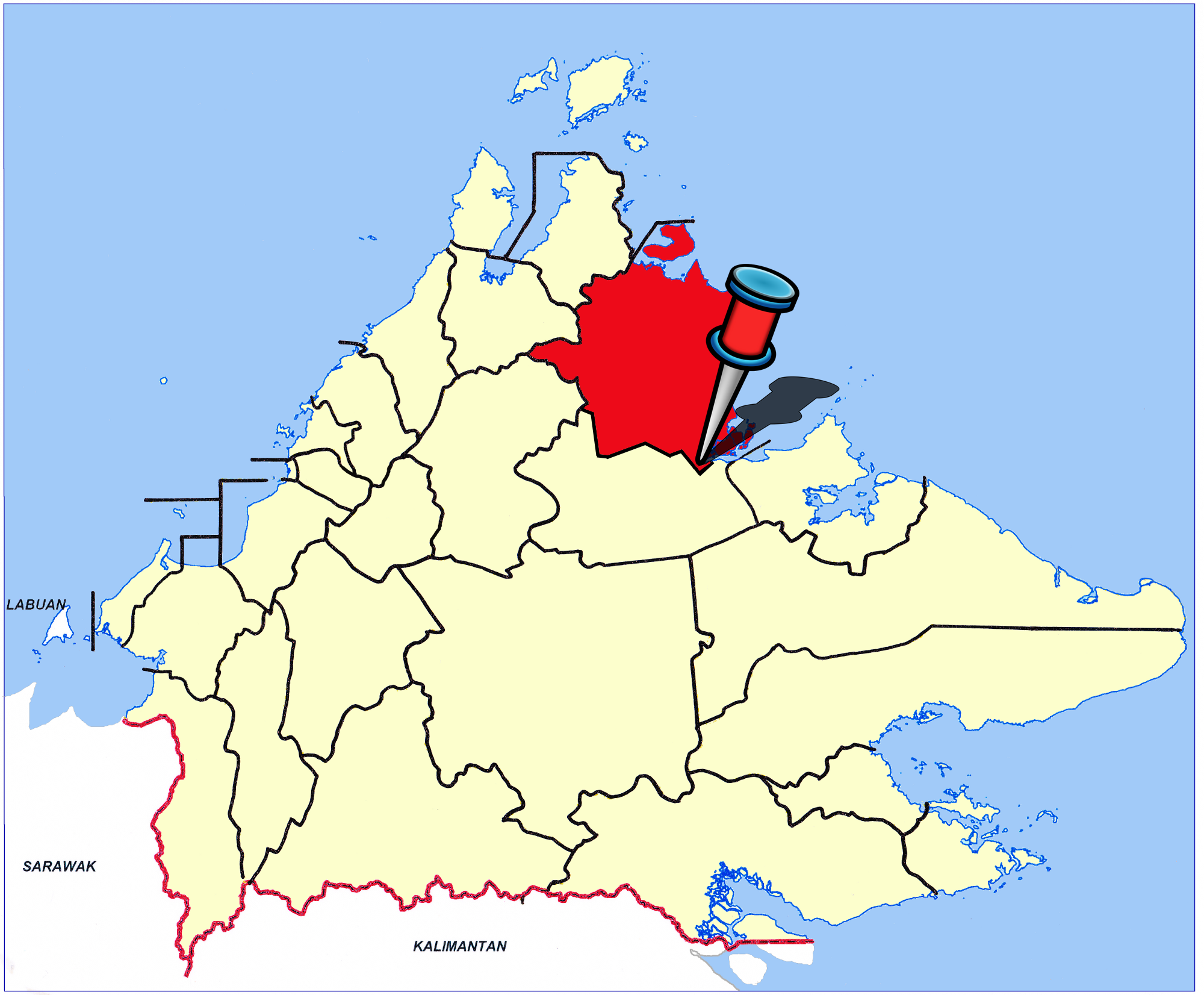
- Coordinates: 5°53′0″N 117°34′0″E
- Country: Malaysia
- State: Sabah
- Division: Sandakan
- District: Beluran

Population (2010)
  - Total: 3,132

Beluran (Malay: Pekan Beluran, Chinese: 比魯蘭), formerly Balmoral, is the capital of the Beluran District in the Sandakan Division in eastern Sabah, Malaysia.

== Demographics ==
Its population was estimated to be around 77,000 in 2020. The population is a mixture of many ethnic groups, with the Kadazan-Dusun, Tidong and Orang Sungai communities being the four largest components.

== Location ==
The town is located about 88 kilometres (55 mi) from Sandakan town (or along Sungai Sapi river).
