= Takis National Secondary School =

Coordinates: 5°43′31″N 115°55′53″E

- Sekolah Menengah Kebangsaan Takis

Location
- PO. BOX 486, 89608; Sabah; Malaysia

Information
- Type: Secondary School
- Motto: Ilmu Asas Kecemerlangan
- Established: 2001
- School district: Papar
- Session: One session
- Principal: Haji Mokhtar Haji Ibrahim
- Grades: Form 1 – Form 6
- Language: Malay language, English, Arabic
- Information: Tel : 088-915251; Fax : 088-911632
- Website: smktakis.webs.com

Takis National Secondary School (Malay: Sekolah Menengah Kebangsaan Takis) is a national secondary school located in East Malaysia's Papar district. This school was established in 2001.

== History ==
SMK Takis is the seventh school was built at the Papar District. The school was built on ten acres of land area and SMK Takis name was chosen because it coincided with the location of the village Takis, Papar. The construction took more than a year starting from July 1999 and completed in January 2001. The intake of students in the first place on 29 and 30 February 2001.

Initially a total of 38 trainers who have been placed at SMK Takis. Over 90% of the number of teachers are graduate teachers in various fields. In other words, SMK Takis capable of providing the various fields of knowledge to the students whether in the form of science and technology, vocational skills and arts and language consistent with the knowledge / expertise possessed by the teachers.

SMK Takis has 40 classrooms which can accommodate between 30 and 40 students. In addition there are various facilities such as Life Skills Workshop, Resource Centre, Computer Lab and other facilities are also available. In terms of area and place, the school is able to accommodate more than a thousand people in a school.

In 2006, SMK Takis has offered a Vocational subjects of Interior to give exposure to students on how to decorate the house building. This subject has offer to students in Form 4 and 5.

== List of Principals ==
Period of Service	Name of Principals
September 2001 – October 2003	Mr. Abidin Marjan
November – December 2003	Datin Aisah Jaman
January 2004 – January 2009	Datin Hjh. Nik Faridah Nik Mustapha
January 2009 – December 2014	Mr. Hj. Mokhtar Bin Hj. Ibrahim
2014 - 2022	Hajah Jainah
2022 - 2024	Mr. Sapri Jeffri
2024–present	Mr. Rafizi Matali
