= Refugees of the Philippines =

Mostly Moro conflict refugees to Sabah (Malaysia) and Indonesia

Displaced Filipinos
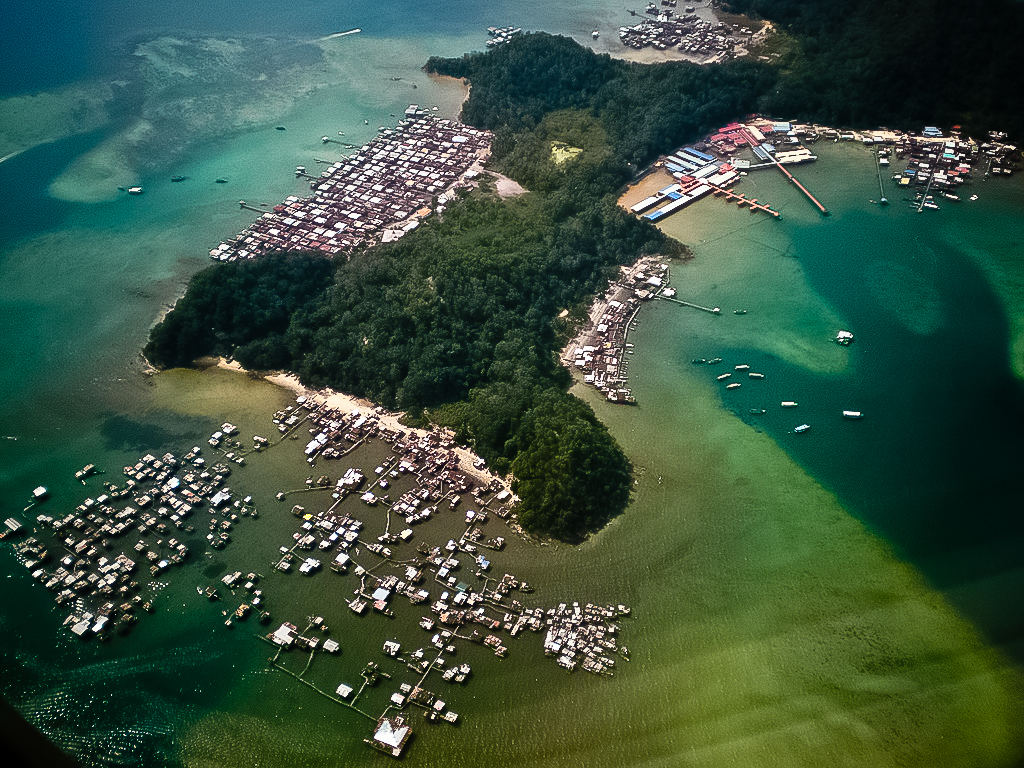
- Gaya Island features the large settlement of Pondo Village, one example of the legacy of Filipino refugees in Sabah who were fleeing the Moro conflict in their home country.

Total population
- ~80,000

Regions with significant populations
- Malaysia: 80,000 (UN estimate) (Note: 60,000 (2012), 73,000 (2013) ▼ down from 120,000 (1986) – 350,000 (1989) (Registered refugees))
- Indonesia: 544 (2014)

Filipino refugees are persons originating from the country of the Philippines. Following the Moro conflict and subsequent major military operation in the islands of Mindanao during the administration of President Ferdinand Marcos in the 1970s, thousands of Filipinos, mainly of Moro ancestry, have sought refuge in the neighbouring countries of Malaysia, Indonesia and Brunei, with the majority of them heading to the state of Sabah in Malaysia.

== Reasons for fleeing ==
In addition to armed conflict in the southern Philippines, many Filipinos flee due to economic factors and hope for a better life. Many are reluctant to return to their homeland that continues to be torn by violence and kidnappings.

== Host countries ==
=== Malaysia ===
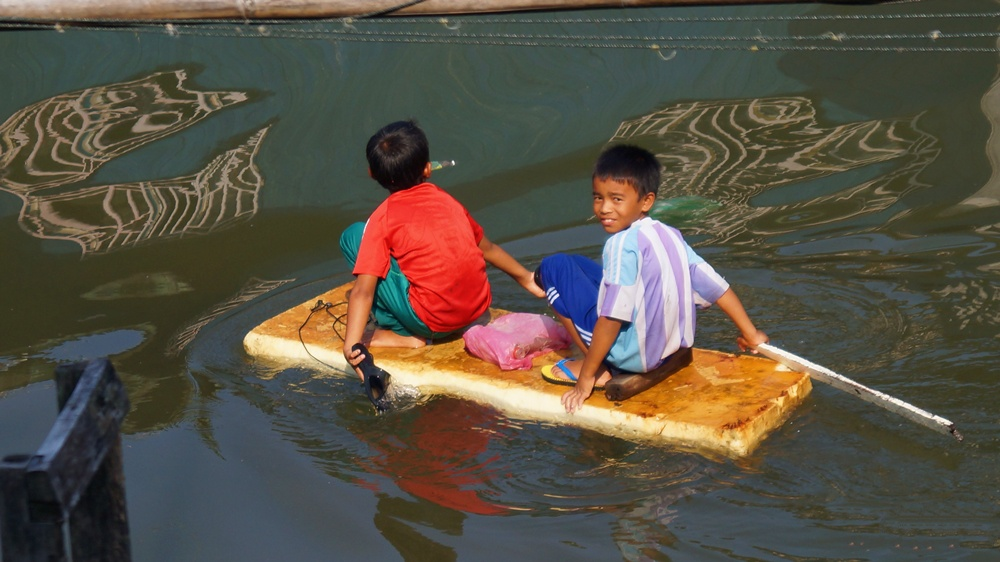
Tausug refugee kids in water

Since the 1970s, thousands of Filipino refugees have emigrated to the state of Sabah, forcing the need for maintenance of the refugees. As Malaysia is not a signatory to the 1951 UN Refugee Convention, the country has maintained that any newly arrived aliens are illegal immigrants rather than refugees. Although unlike the economically motivated illegal immigrants, the Filipino refugees have long been granted special permission to stay despite limited access to state employment, social services and public amenities.

The United Nations High Commission for Refugees (UNHCR) established its office in the state in 1977, with around $2.7 million having been allocated for the maintenance of the refugees' children's education, with most of it being allocated to the Sandakan area. Despite this, however, the Philippines side constantly accused the Malaysian side, especially the Sabah authorities, of victimising the refugees with the dismissal of their workers by Sabah businessmen.

The total of Filipino refugees was only 20,367 in the first quarter of 1970. By 1978, it increased to over 92,000, with a non-official estimate putting the total already at 140,000. The refugees rose to over 350,000 in 1989. As there was still no definite sign the conflict would permanently stop, the influx of Filipino refugees continued even after the peace agreement with the Moro National Liberation Front (MNLF) in 1976.

Following the government decision to issue residency visas and a special card known as the IMM13 to the refugees, the UNHCR closed its office in 1987 after operating for 10 years. To this date, the main office is being maintained in Kuala Lumpur.

=== Indonesia ===
As there is no official estimate of the total of Filipino refugees in Indonesia, the exact population is unknown. Recent findings in 2014 found there are at least 544 Filipino refugees (mostly from the Bajau community) taking shelter in Derawan Island, Berau Regency, East Kalimantan. It is believed their presence began in 2010, with some of the refugees claiming they are Malaysian citizens, although they were found with a special document released by the Malaysian government which stated they are not citizens of that country during an identity check-up by the Indonesian authorities. Responding to the report, Indonesian President Joko Widodo ordered them to be sent back to their country in the Philippines immediately, although it is still unknown whether the process of deportation has begun. Nunukan Regency in North Kalimantan also reportedly saw a large Filipino refugee presence as recently as early 2017.

== Aid ==
=== Issues ===
The UNHCR office in the Malaysian state of Sabah has been giving aid to the refugees for a period of 10 years; however, following the closure of its office, many of the refugees have been roaming in and around Sabah. Following the release of the report from the Royal Commission of Inquiry on illegal immigrants in Sabah (RCI), which stated many of the Filipino refugees have illegally obtained Malaysian citizenship, the UNHCR began monitoring the situation. However, since the UNHCR did not have any permanent presence in the state anymore, the monitoring capacity was limited.

As the Philippines never had the intention to establish its consulate in the Malaysian state of Sabah to look after the welfare of its citizens, the blame was also put on the Philippines side for its lack of co-operation, as the country continuously criticised the treatment towards its refugees without giving more of its efforts to help and solve the problems of its own citizens.

By the end of 2014, UNHCR Malaysia, together with UNICEF, plans to support local non-governmental organisations (NGOs) to conduct a workshop on birth registration which will involve different government agencies, such as the Malaysian National Registration Department, local legal practitioners, and relevant stakeholders. Filipino refugee children also have been enrolled in the recently established Alternative Learning Centre (ALC) that was set up by Filipino volunteers in Sabah in collaboration with various local NGOs.

By 2016, under the Philippines administration reform of President Rodrigo Duterte, the Philippine government began to sign a deal with the Malaysian government for the gradual repatriation of Filipino refugees in Sabah. The Philippines side also announced their plan to establish a consular office in the state along with the establishment of their own school and hospital to care for their nationals as had been recommended previously. However, according to Philippine Representative from Palawan Jose C. Alvarez, they are more interested in establishing a Palawan Business Office in the state than a Philippine Office that will also give the similar services like passport granting, renewal of travel documents and other requirements, as well as extend business assistance to the Filipino people when the need arises, giving excuses that it is only proper and logical to set up the main office if there are an increasing number of Filipino traders, especially from Palawan.

The Filipinos in the state expressed their hopes that more attention will be given from the Filipino consular services, especially on easy and better access to communication facilities, a more friendly attitude from embassy officials and staff and transparency in all official transactions, as they had repeatedly expressed their dissatisfaction over how the manner of consular missions was conducted with the presence of "middlemen", delays in deliveries of travel documents, difficulties in telephoning the main Philippine embassy in Kuala Lumpur and rudeness of some of the embassy officials and staff.

== Durable solution ==
=== Repatriation ===
The Malaysian government is criticised for its contrast policy in dealing with refugees, with different treatments having been compared between the non-Muslim Vietnamese refugees, which are quickly being repatriated, and the Muslim Filipino refugees, which are still being maintained in the country until this day. In defending the presence of Filipino refugees, Ghazali Shafie who is the Home Minister at the time justified their position with the support of Deputy Prime Minister Mahathir Mohamad:

Their presence will not have adverse effects on the peace and order of the country because they intended to go back whereas the presence of Vietnamese immigrants could have adverse consequences on the country as they had no intention of returning to their homeland after the war.

Ghazali Shafie, Malaysian Home Minister.

Most of the Filipino refugees are issued with IMM13 documents by the Malaysian government during the Mahathir administration, with many of them having been controversially naturalised as citizens.

Repatriation of Filipino refugees remains difficult due to the ongoing conflict in the southern Philippines. The latest peace deal between the Government of the Philippines and Moro Islamic Liberation Front (MILF) is a step towards peace and stability in the southern Philippines. The MILF have been welcoming the return of Filipino refugees from Malaysia as the peace is being gradually restored in their homeland. The International Monitoring Team (IMT) led by Malaysia has also been monitoring the ceasefire between the Philippine government and MILF since 2010 and hopes that the new administration of the Philippine government will put an end to the refugee issues which have been plaguing the bilateral relations between the two countries.

Groups such as the MNLF under Nur Misuari have recently staged violent attacks to oppose the peace agreement between the MILF and the Philippine government forces, with the latest major attack resulting in the Zamboanga City crisis in late 2013, which presents an obstacle to repatriation and led to another new wave of refugees. In March 2017, a Comprehensive Agreement on the Bangsamoro was initiated between the central government of the Philippines and the MILF, witnessed by Malaysia, for the establishment of Bangsamoro in the southern Philippines as a replacement of the Autonomous Region in Muslim Mindanao (ARMM) to establish a permanent peace within the region. Following the realisation, the MILF urged Filipino refugees in Sabah to return to redevelop their homeland.

== Hosting refugees ==
There are at least five camps for the Filipino refugees in Malaysia, such as in Kinarut in Papar, Telipok in Kota Kinabalu, Bahagia Village in Sandakan, Selamat Village in Semporna, and Hidayat Village in Tawau, with many Sabah local politicians having repeatedly urged the closure of the camps and repatriation of the refugees to their home country, as the camps have become the source of many criminal activities perpetrated by the refugees.

In late 2016, the Sabah state government submitted recommendations to the Malaysian federal government through the Main Committee on Management of Foreigners to move all the refugee placement schemes in the state to other more suitable locations far from the towns and industrial development areas. Further, in 2019, under a new Malaysian government, the IMM13 document for refugees from the southern Philippines is being replaced with the Temporary Sabah Pass (PSS) to solve the problems once and for all which have been ongoing since the 1970s, where the old document was misused by the refugees, subsequently posing threats to the security of the state.

== Criticism of refugee settlements and Malaysian authorities ==
The huge Filipino refugee settlements in Sabah have been mainly criticised by the locals there for contributing to the significant rise of rampant crimes, with the refugees' loyalty towards the country they are seeking refuge in also being questioned for the unstoppable crimes perpetrated from their own community, as a Filipino man was recently charged in court as recently as 2017 for supporting the extreme ideology of the Abu Sayyaf terrorist group.

The influx of Filipino refugees was also partly blamed on the Malaysian authorities since the latter support the insurgency in the southern Philippines, which subsequently caused the war and violence that destroyed many of the Moros' homes in Sulu and Mindanao, a violence arising out of the Moro conflict, an insurgency against the Philippine government which the Malaysian government publicly supported until the year 2001. Many in the Philippines also believed that this was done to counteract reconquest attempts by the presently defunct Sultanate of Sulu, which are partly supported by certain politicians in the Philippines. Malaysia is criticised for being responsible for the war in the Philippines since the confession by their previous prime minister, Mahathir Mohamad, yet they refuse to host refugees from the war they themselves caused. The Filipino refugees also feel trapped, as they were not considered as Filipino citizens by their origin country government, and the present country they are living in, Malaysia, refuses to grant citizenship to many such refugees, classifying them as a stateless people.

== See also ==
- Filipinos in Malaysia
- Moro conflict
- Cross border attacks in Sabah
- Illegal immigrants in Malaysia
- Philippine Refugee Processing Center
- Philippines and the Holocaust
- White Russian refugees in the Philippines
