= Filipinos in Malaysia =

Malaysians of Filipino origin
Total population
- 325,089

Regions with significant populations
- Sabah, Sarawak, Greater Kuala Lumpur, Penang & Perak

Languages
- Tausug, Chavacano, Sama-Bajaw languages, Tagalog, other Philippine languages, English, Malay

Religion
- Islam • Roman Catholicism

Related ethnic groups
- Filipinos, Austronesian peoples

The Filipino Malaysians consists of people of full or partial Filipino descent who were born in or immigrated to Malaysia. Filipinos in Malaysia comprise migrants and residents from the Philippines and their descendants living in Malaysia. Because of the short distance between the two nations, many Filipinos mainly from Mindanao have migrated to the Malaysian state of Sabah to escape from the conflict, poverty and in search for better lives. About 325,089 Filipinos live in Malaysia. Many of them are illegal residents while there are a smaller number of migrant workers and fewer permanent residents.

== History ==
Most of the Filipinos especially the Bajau had lived around the state of Sabah even since before the colonial period, while the Suluk had lived on the eastern part of Sabah from Kudat to Tawau as these areas was once under the influence of the Sultanate of Sulu. Others such as Ilonggo, Waray, Zamboangueño (living in Semporna since prior to the creation of Malaysia), Tagalog, Cebuano and Bicolanos then come to North Borneo (present-day Sabah) in 1920s and 1930s to work under the British government and various private companies. Many Filipinos in Malaysia are Moros.

== Labours ==
In December 2011, an estimated 325,089 Filipinos lived legally in Malaysia. By 2011, 55,828 Filipinos were recorded working on contracts in Malaysia. A majority of these workers come from the provinces of Basilan, Sulu, Palawan, Tawi-Tawi, and Zamboanga Peninsula. There are at least 25 Filipino community organisations in Malaysia.

== Illegal immigration and crime issues ==
The majority of undocumented Filipinos live in the Malaysian state of Sabah, with most of them coming from the Mindanao islands. They are frequently targeted by the Malaysian immigration for repatriation. In 2002, the first major crackdown on illegal immigration occurred, with around 64,000 Filipinos being repatriated. Around 4,000 to 6,000 Filipinos are deported each year for immigration offences, and the Philippine government says that there are many Filipinos detained in various immigration centres of Malaysia awaiting deportation. Some of these reportedly include children younger than 19 years old. Many of them are deported because of overstaying their visas, or being involved in crime. Nearly 72% of the foreign prison population in Sabah are Filipinos.

Since the attack by Kiram's in 2013, more Filipinos in the state facing an increase on discrimination and became the possible target for retaliation especially from the local Borneo tribes due to the killing of Malaysian police who mainly comprising the indigenous Borneo races.

== Notable people ==
Almost all figures in the list of the notable people Filipino descent in Malaysia are of mixed descent, particularly with the natives of Sabah. Mixed-marriage is a pattern which is shared with most of Filipino descent in Malaysia (excluding to the recently arrived migrants), after settling in the Malaysian soil after generations, assimilation process and the common Islamic background.

- Albert Nicomedes - Hairstylist
- Andrea Fonseka - Miss Universe Malaysia 2004. She is of mixed Sinhalese (Sri Lankan), Portuguese, Spanish, Filipino and Chinese descent.
- Arshad Zamir - Actor and the winner of MasterChef Malaysia All Stars.
- Bella Dally - Actress
- Hans Isaac - Actor. He is of Indian, Eurasian and Filipino descent.
- Iqbal Mazlan - Actor
- Julfekar - Composer
- Julylen Liew Gizelle - Miss Supranational Malaysia 2016
- Maria Farida - Actress
- Melinda Roos - Writer
- Scarlett Megan Liew Zi Ling - Miss Intercontinental Malaysia 2018. She is of Sino-Kadazan and Filipino descent.
- Valentino Bon Jovi Bong - Squash player
- Yazmin Aziz - Filipino Malaysian Singer, Songwriter and Recording Artist.

== See also ==
- Malaysia–Philippines relations
- Embassy of the Philippines, Kuala Lumpur
- Malaysians in the Philippines
