= Embassy of the Philippines, Kuala Lumpur =

Diplomatic mission of the Philippines in Malaysia

Embassy of the Philippines, Kuala Lumpur Pasuguan ng Pilipinas sa Kuala Lumpur Kedutaan Filipina di Kuala Lumpur

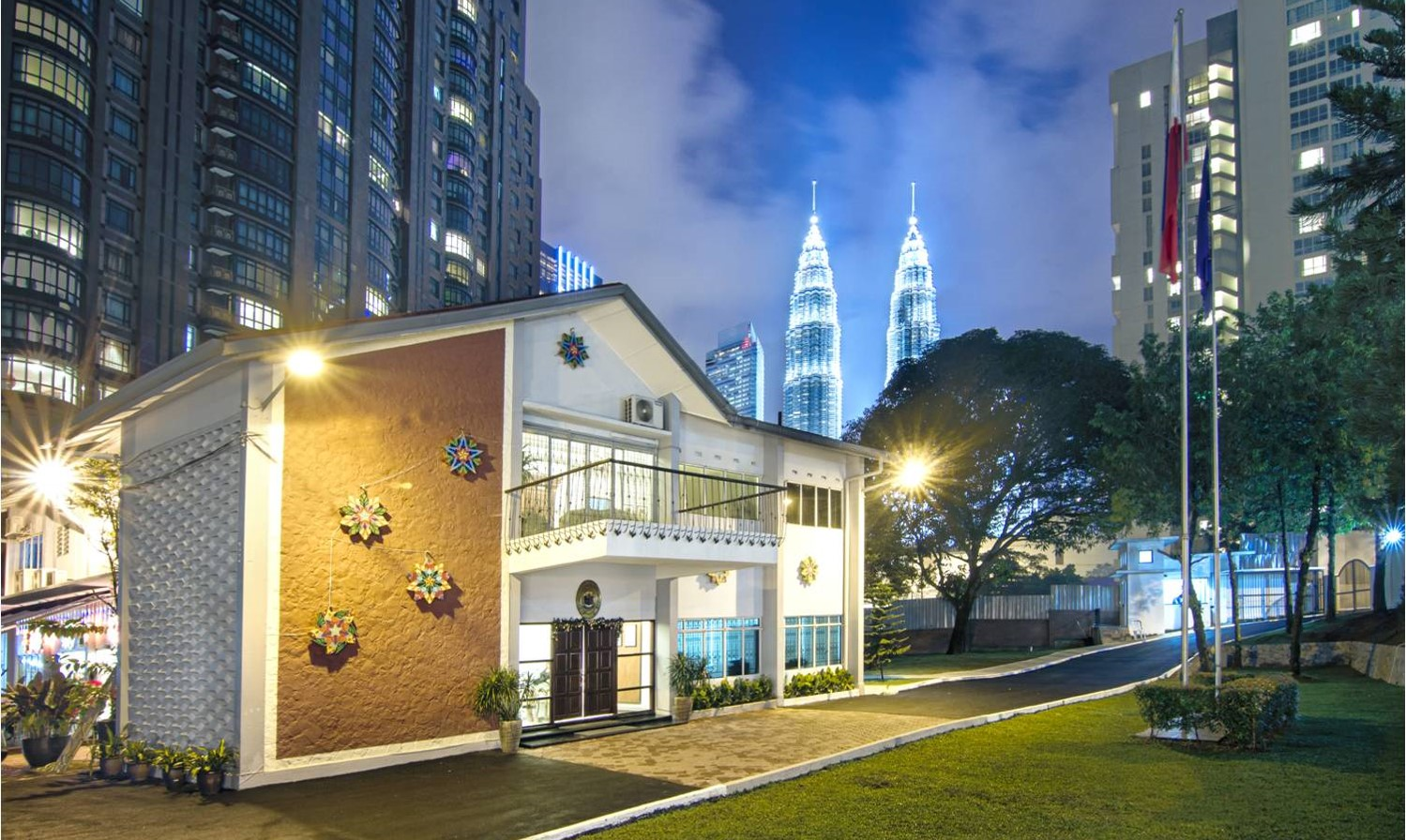
- Location: Kuala Lumpur
- Address: 1 Jalan Changkat Kia Peng
- Coordinates: 3°09′06.5″N 101°42′52.3″E
- Ambassador: Maria Angela A. Ponce
- Website: kualalumpurpe.dfa.gov.ph

The Embassy of the Philippines in Kuala Lumpur is the diplomatic mission of the Republic of the Philippines to Malaysia. It is at 1 Jalan Changkat Kia Peng in central Kuala Lumpur, near significant city landmarks like the Kuala Lumpur City Centre and Bukit Bintang.

== History ==
The establishment of a Philippine diplomatic presence in the then-Federation of Malaya was first called for in the second State of the Nation Address of President Carlos P. Garcia, which led to the opening of a legation later that year shortly after the country attained independence. The legation was later upgraded to a full embassy in 1961, with Yusup Abubakar, deployed at the time to the Philippine Embassy in Cairo, and who a decade earlier was appointed as consul to Singapore, Malaya and North Borneo by President Elpidio Quirino, becoming the first resident Philippine ambassador.

The embassy was ordered to close twice in the 1960s, both times because of the North Borneo dispute. In 1963, the Philippine government closed the embassy and recalled all its diplomats shortly after the formation of the Federation of Malaysia, aiming to force the Malaysian government to settle the dispute. Five years later, President Ferdinand Marcos ordered the Embassy to close again after Senator Ninoy Aquino exposed the Jabidah massacre, leading to Malaysia breaking off all diplomatic relations with the Philippines. The dispute has led to occasional demonstrations outside the embassy, most recently after the 2013 Lahad Datu standoff.

== Building ==
The current chancery of the Philippine Embassy in Kuala Lumpur is a two-story residential structure built in 1962. Previously the home of Tunku Abdul Rahman, Malaysia's first prime minister, the property was acquired by the Philippine government in 1987. Since then the chancery had been renovated three times: in 1993, 2011 and 2012, with the 2011 renovation entailing the replacement of the building's roof and electrical wiring, as well as the construction of a gazebo within the compound, although the property itself had never been truly renovated even before it came to the Philippine government's ownership.

The 2012 renovation, the most extensive of the three, entailed converting the building from its previous residential layout, which was said to look "undistinguished", to an open floor plan more suited to the office functions of an embassy, while still retaining the exterior of the historically significant property. Led by then Ambassador J. Eduardo Malaya and Malaysia-based Filipino architect Bart Vista, the renovation, which began in February 2012, included converting and expanding the former dining room into a new community hall, extensively replacing flooring and other features, updating the building's electric wiring and air conditioning systems, installing new stained glass and lighting fixtures, repainting the building's exterior, and redoing the compound's landscaping. Completed on June 10, 2012, just before Independence Day, the renovation, which cost ₱19 million, came at no cost to the government, with the bill footed by Vista, his contractors and suppliers, and other members of the Filipino community in Malaysia, including the Kuala Lumpur chapter of the United Architects of the Philippines.

The Congress of the Philippines, through House Resolution No. 34 dated 25 January 2017, commended Ambassador Malaya for his “proactive leadership” and Architect Bart Vista for his exemplary kindness and patriotism in relation to the renovation project. As cited in the Resolution, the embassy now features an open workspace concept which revitalized its atmosphere, improved the Embassy staff’s performance and esprit de corps, and made the premises more hospitable to its visitors, clients and the Filipino community in Malaysia.

Within the main chancery, the embassy's consular and assistance-to-nationals sections are located on the first floor, as is the community hall, while the political, economic and finance sections are located on the second floor, along with the ambassador's office and other administrative offices. The compound also has an annex building, where the offices of the embassy's service attaches are located.

== Staff and activities ==
The Philippine Embassy in Kuala Lumpur is headed by the Philippine ambassador to Malaysia, Maria Angela A. Ponce.

The embassy's activities center around providing to the needs and welfare of the large community of Overseas Filipino Workers and other Filipinos in Malaysia, a point made by those who have lived in the country. It continually monitors the situation of Filipino laborers entering Malaysia, particularly in the wake of the Lahad Datu standoff, while also warning those seeking employment in Malaysia to be vigilant against illegal recruitment. The embassy has also helped facilitate the legalization of Filipinos who may be in Malaysia illegally, and cooperates with the Philippine Bureau of Immigration and other government agencies to regulate the flow of OFWs to Malaysia.

In addition to providing consular assistance to the local Filipino community, the embassy has also facilitated the furthering of cultural and educational ties between the Philippines and Malaysia, including hosting art exhibits by Mindanao-based Filipino artists, organizing food-themed events, and even forging official links with the University of Malaya.

=== Activities in Sabah ===
Despite being located in Kuala Lumpur, the embassy also conducts extensive activities in Sabah, where there is a large Filipino population. In 2016, Ambassador Jose Eduardo Malaya III and two other embassy officials were awarded the Gawad Mabini for setting up alternative learning centers for Filipinos and other migrant children in Sabah.

Owing to the North Borneo dispute, the Philippine government has refused to set up a consulate there, as that would imply a recognition of Malaysian sovereignty over the territory. Instead, it has tried to set up a presence short of setting up a full consulate, although all attempts at doing so have been shut down by the Malaysian government. The most recent attempt at setting up a consular office in Kota Kinabalu, spearheaded in 2002 during the presidency of Gloria Macapagal Arroyo, was shut down by the Malaysian government in January 2003, while urging the Philippine government to set up a full consulate instead: something that DFA Undersecretary Lauro Baja called "too political". Instead, the embassy fields mobile teams to Sabah to provide consular services there.

== See also ==
- List of diplomatic missions of the Philippines
- Malaysia–Philippines relations
