= Malay language in the Philippines =

Minority spoken language

Malay (Filipino: Wikang Malayo; Malay: Bahasa Melayu) is spoken by a minority of Filipinos, particularly in the Palawan, Sulu Archipelago and parts of Mindanao, mostly in the form of trade and creole languages, such as Sabah Malay.

Historically, Old Malay existed prior to the Malacca Sultanate, as evidenced by the Laguna Copperplate Inscription of 900.

In the 16th century, Ferdinand Magellan used a Malay servant Enrique of Malacca to converse with the Visayans who lived in the central Visayan islands at the time.

Until the late of 18th century to the early 19th century, there are still many documents from Sulu and Mindanao that used Malay language such as The Sulu Treaties and the Royal Letters from The Sultanate of Maguindanao that were written in Malay language. The documents now are preserved in The British Library.

Even in predominantly non-Malay speaking communities, mostly in Muslim communities, titles of nobility such as datu (datuk), raja or rajamuda, which themselves originate from Sanskrit, are retained. Numerous loan words exist in Philippine languages today from Malay, with the greatest concentration being in the areas that have or historically had heavy contact and cultural exchange with native-Malay speaking states. These are, respectively, the south central, southwest and northwest areas of the country, with the languages Bahasa Sug, Sinama, Maranao, Iranun, Maguindanao, Kapampangan, Tagalog, Cebuano and Ilocano exhibiting numerous Malay or Old Malay loan words.

One variant of Malay spoken in the Philippines is Indonesian, which is spoken by Indonesians who have either settled or do business in the Philippines. It is also learned as a foreign language, by students and members of the armed forces.

== History ==
The use of Malay was a result of extensive interactions between the native kingdoms in the Philippines and the various ancient Malay world civilizations that existed in modern-day Brunei, Indonesia, and Malaysia as it was the trade language of the entire Maritime Southeast Asian region. The Laguna Copperplate Inscription, the earliest-known document found in the Philippines was written in a mix of Old Malay, Classical Tagalog and Old Javanese and in the Kawi alphabet which recorded interactions between the classical civilizations in Luzon with the Majapahit empire of Java and the Srivijaya empire of Sumatra.

The Old Malay spoken in the archipelago also reflected the religious nature of the region - the archipelago was inhabited by a mix of Buddhist, Animists and Hindus. Upon the arrival of Portuguese conquistador Ferdinand Magellan in Cebu, his slave, Enrique, a Malaccan-native had to speak on his behalf since he was a native-Malay speaker who acted as a translator between Spanish, Portuguese and Malay. Enrique likely perished in Mactan Island during the battle that killed Ferdinand Magellan in 1521.

The use of Malay in the Philippines reached its height with the introduction of Islam by Malay Muslim, Arab, Persian, Chinese Muslim and Indian Muslim preachers to the islands. However, this was in the form of Classical Malay, a dialect which originated from the Riau-Malacca region. Along with that, Arabic was also introduced as well as the introduction of the Jawi script, an Arabic-based alphabet for Malay. The dynasties of the Islamic sultanates in Mindanao were themselves of ethnic Malay descent with sprinkles of Arab ancestry (others possess some Persian and Indian blood) such as those of the Sultanate of Maguindanao. Malay became the regional lingua franca of trade and many polities enculturated Islamic Malay customs and governance to varying degrees, including Kapampangans, Tagalogs and other coastal Philippine peoples, particularly Tausūgs, Maranao, and Maguindanao people. According to Bruneian folklore, at around 1500 Sultan Bolkiah launched a successful northward expedition to break Tondo’s monopoly as a regional entrepot of the Chinese trade and established Maynila (Selurong) across the Pasig delta, ruled by his heirs as a satellite. Subsequently, Malay through Bruneian influence spread elsewhere around Manila Bay, present-day Batangas, and coastal Mindoro through closer trade and political relations, with a growing Kapampangan-Tagalog diaspora based in Brunei and beyond in Malacca in various professions as traders, sailors, shipbuilders, mercenaries, governors, and slaves. Intermarriages between native Muslims of Sulu Archipelago, Sultanate of Maguindanao, and Sultanate of Lanao and Kapampangan and Tagalog Muslims (called Luzones) even took place later.

With progress of Spanish conquest in the 16th century, the use of Malay among the Philippine natives quickly deteriorated and diminished as it was replaced by Spanish. It became non-existent among the Christian Filipinos. Malay remained much confined to the Muslim population of Mindanao and the Sulu Archipelago, who actively resisted Spanish rule and attempts by missionaries to convert them to Christianity.

During the late 19th century, with the deterioration of Spanish rule, a Pan-Malayan movement began in the Philippines, spearheaded by national hero José Rizal, who had a vision of "uniting the Malayan race" from the bondage of separation by colonial powers. He had actually tried learning the Malay language, having believed it to be an original of Tagalog. But Rizal's vision and movement did not move further when President Manuel L. Quezon chose Tagalog as the basis for the evolution and adoption of the national language of the Philippines on December 30, 1937.

Politicians in the Philippines had actually contemplated on renaming the country to "Malaysia", before the actual federation was named so. Some maps had also referred to the area now comprising Philippines, Indonesia and East Malaysia as "Malaysia" as a whole.

Malay is related to the native languages of the Philippines, both being Austronesian languages. Many words in the Tagalog and various Visayan languages are derived from Old Malay.

Although the history of Malay influence in Philippine history is a subject of conversation, no attempts have been made to ever promote Malay or even Spanish. The number of Malay-speakers in the Philippines is unknown; as a result of the 300-year Spanish rule, most are very confined to the southern parts of Mindanao (specifically in the Zamboanga Peninsula, where Spanish creole is natively spoken) and the Sulu Archipelago in a region known as Bangsamoro; Spanish creole is also spoken by some Muslim and Christian residents in Sulu Archipelago. This region, derives from the Malay word bangsa and the Spanish moro, the Muslim peoples of the Philippines refer to themselves Moro which comes from a Spanish word meaning "Moor". The lingua franca of the native residents of Bangsamoro are Tagalog/Filipino and Cebuano.

== Contemporary use ==
The treatment of the Muslim peoples of Mindanao by the Christian-dominated government in the Philippines during the 1970s also worsened any hopes of Malay ever being revived into nationwide use again. Today, Filipino and English are the official languages of the Philippines.

There are also misconceptions in the Philippines between Ethnic Malays and Malay race. While it is true that certain Filipino ethnic groups (namely the Visayans (including Tausūgs) and Maguindanao, with some Maranao) contain Malay ancestors, the ethnic Malays themselves are focused around the Malay Peninsula, eastern Sumatra, coastal Borneo and southern Thailand. The Malay race compasses a larger class of Austronesian ethnic groups in the entire Malay Archipelago. This results in false labels to pre-occupation rulers such as Lapu-Lapu, the famous native chief who killed Magellan as a Malay and a Muslim although he was ethnically Visayan who spoke old Cebuano and whose religious background is obscure.

The Indonesian language, which is the official dialect of Malay spoken in the Philippines' southern neighbor Indonesia, has a notable presence of speakers in Davao City since the city is home to the Indonesian School which caters to expatriates in Mindanao and aims to protect Indonesian language and culture among the expatriate community. Indonesian is also taught as a foreign language in the University of the Philippines.

Since 2013, the Indonesian Embassy in the Philippines has given basic Indonesian language courses to 16 batches of Filipino students, as well as training to members of the Armed Forces of the Philippines. The Indonesian Embassy in Washington, D.C., USA also began offering free Indonesian language courses at the beginner and intermediate level.

In an interview, Department of Education Secretary Armin Luistro said that the country's government should promote Indonesian or Malaysian, which are related to Filipino and other regional languages. Thus, the possibility of offering it as an optional subject in public schools is being studied. Bahasa Melayu and Bahasa Indonesia is also spoken as a third or fourth language by native Filipinos of the Maguindanao and Tausug tribes with some of Maranao tribe, especially those who have studied in Malaysia, Indonesia as religious students, migrant laborers or long time residents in Sabah, Malaysia. The dissemination of the Malay language was also through the usage of Malay books in the study of Islam.

== See also ==
- List of loanwords in Tagalog
- Malays in the Philippines
- Old Malay
- Laguna Copperplate Inscription
- Languages of the Philippines
- Malaysian language
- Indonesian language
