= Lok Kawi =

Township in Penampang, Sabah, Malaysia

Coordinates: 5°51′N 116°03′E

- Township and suburb of Penampang
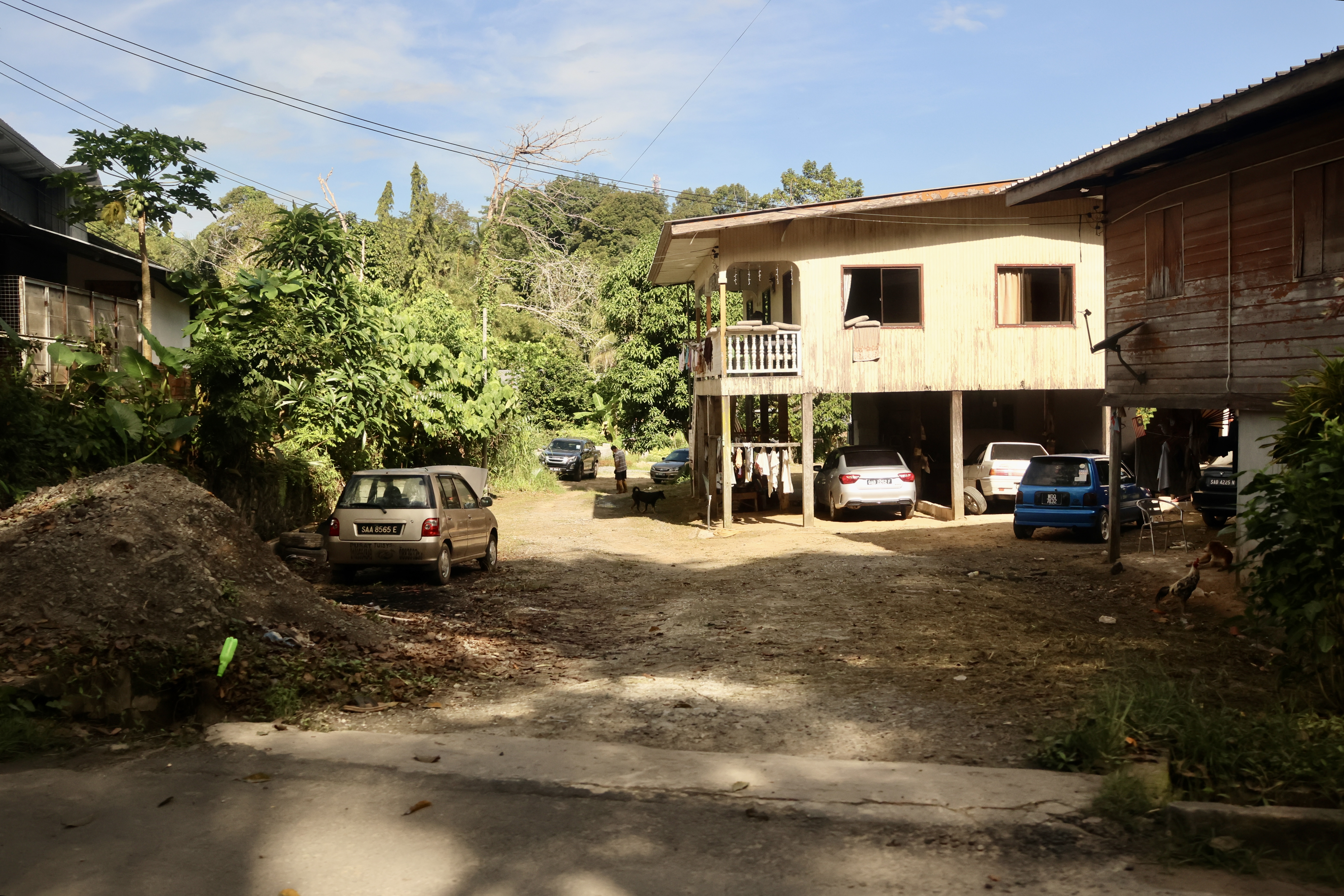
- Lok Kawi in 2023

- Location within Borneo
- Country: Malaysia
- State: Sabah
- Division: West Coast
- District: Penampang
- Elevation: 5 m (16 ft)
- Highest elevation: 288 m (945 ft)
- Time zone: UTC+8 (MST)

Lok Kawi is a township in Penampang District, Sabah, Malaysia, about 15 kilometres south of the state capital of Kota Kinabalu. Nearby towns include Putatan in the north and Kinarut in the south. The main route through the township is Federal Route 501.

Originally a small village, Lok Kawi now features a small industrial estate as well as modern residential developments. It is the site of the Lok Kawi Army Camp and the Lok Kawi Wildlife Park. Lok Kawi also features one of the few Hindu temples in Kota Kinabalu, the Sri Subramaniyar Temple.

In the 1920s, the author W. Somerset Maugham was a frequent visitor to Lok Kawi; his niece was married to the manager of Lok Kawi Estate.
