= Kinarut =

- Town cum suburb of Papar

Other transcription(s)
  - Chinese: 京那律
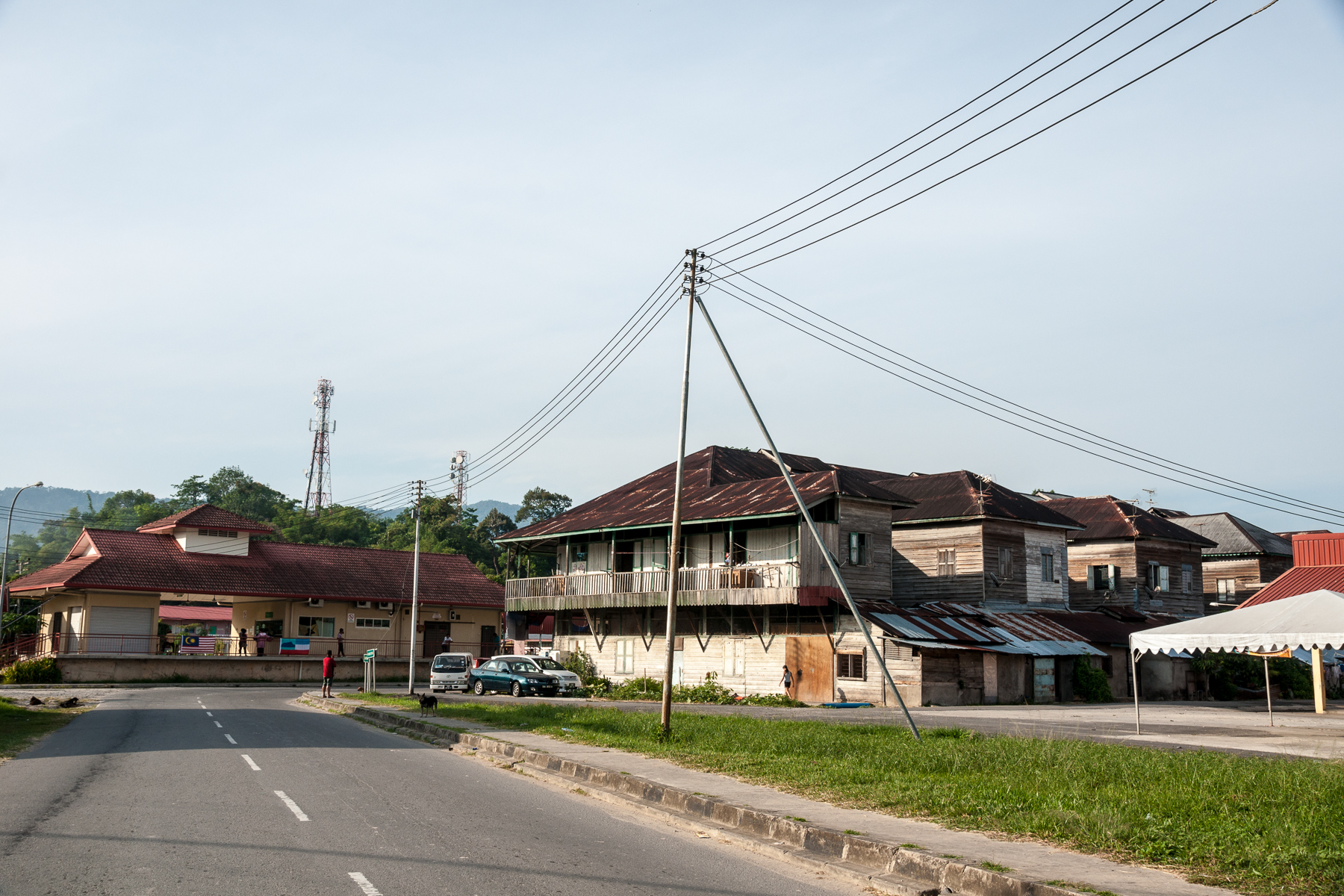
- Kinarut town centre and railway station
- Interactive map of Kinarut
- Coordinates: 5°49′0″N 116°03′0″E
- Country: Malaysia
- State: Sabah
- Division: West Coast
- District: Papar
- Administration: Papar District Council

Government
  - Body: Papar District Council

Population (2010)
  - Total: 18,029
- Time zone: UTC+8 (MST)
- Neighbourhood Area: Papar, Lok Kawi

Kinarut is a town in the state of Sabah, Malaysia. It is located about 20 kilometres south of the state capital, Kota Kinabalu, and Kinarut railway station is one of the stops on the Sabah State Railway. Kinarut is under the administration of the Papar District.

== Etymology ==
Several theories exist as to the etymological origins of the name 'Kinarut'. One such theory is that it refers to a street in the town which was formerly called China Road. Another theory is that it originated from the Dusun word Kinorut (Note: North Borneo Native Dusun Tindal dialect 'Kinorut' mean "serious thing". For example "when you have to put or tie a rope around something e.g. a tree more than once or at least ten times. This mean you made the tie seriously and you have the intention of letting it tied permanently or the knot is not easily loosened. In just a short meaning is that you just cannot afford to let go some precious item. When you tie one end of a rope with big wild buffalo on the other end onto a tree, you have to use this 'Kinorut' method so that your rope won't get loose from the tree with the precious commodity. An example of this word is that when a Dusun man bring in a buffalo to a bazaar, he'll tie one end of the buffalo rope on a tree and using 'Kinorut' method.) which means 'cutting using a knife'.

== History ==
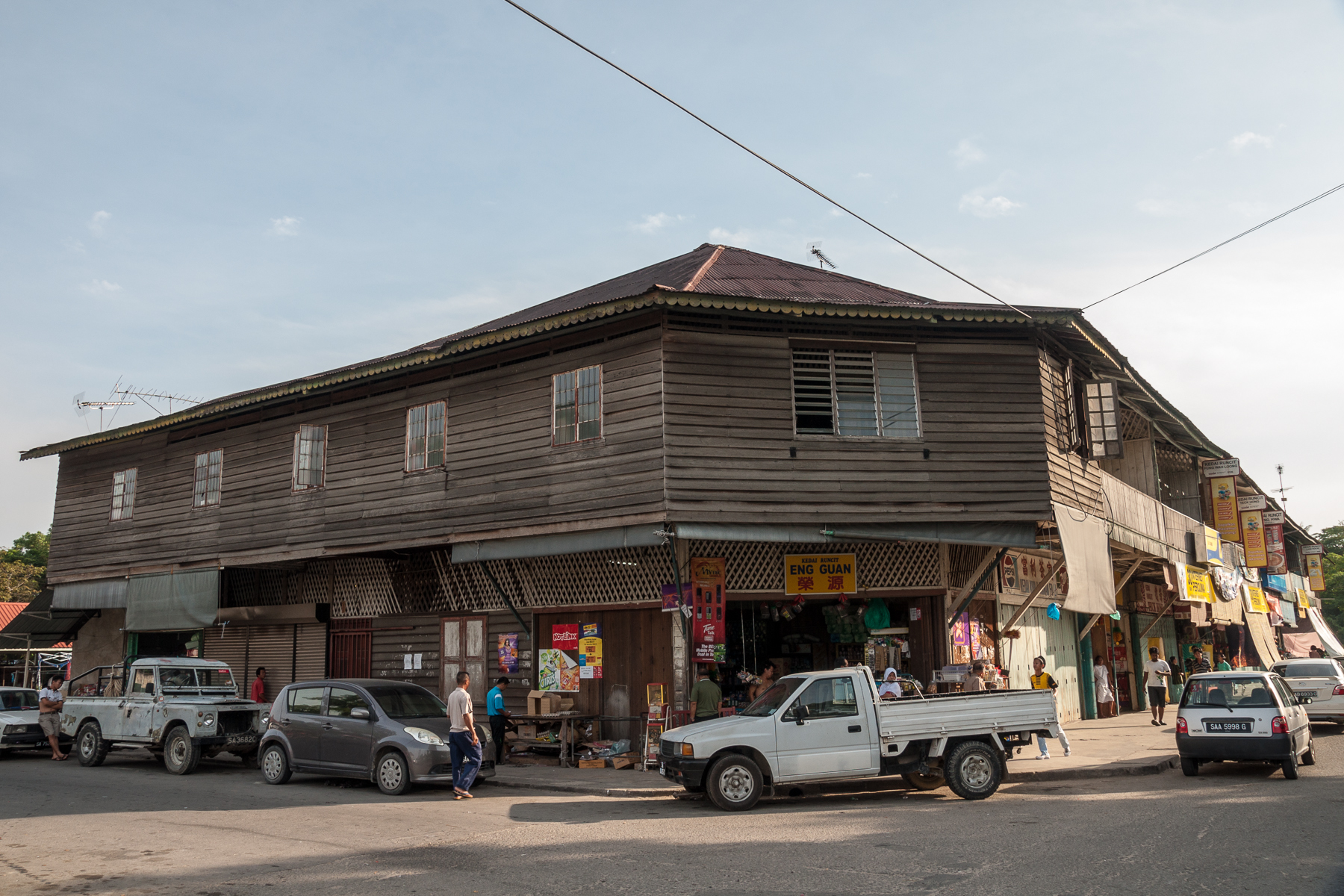
Colonial-era shoplots

Kinarut originally belonged to the Sultanate of Brunei. In the late 17th century, when Sultan Abdul Hakkul Mubin had to withdraw from Chermin Island (Pulau Chermin) during the Brunei Civil War, he built a base in Kinarut at a strategic location protected by two rivers. He remained there for ten years as the Sultan of Kinarut, during which incidents of piracy in the surrounding seas decreased significantly. With help from the local Bajau and Dusun people, he managed to counter several attacks from Sultan Muhyiddin.

== Demographics ==
A 2010 census estimated the population of Kinarut at 18,029. This population consists mainly of Bajaus, Bruneian Malays, Kadazans and Chinese (of whom most are Hakka Chinese) There is also a large Filipino refugee settlement in Kinarut, which has reportedly caused ethnic tension among locals.

== Attractions ==
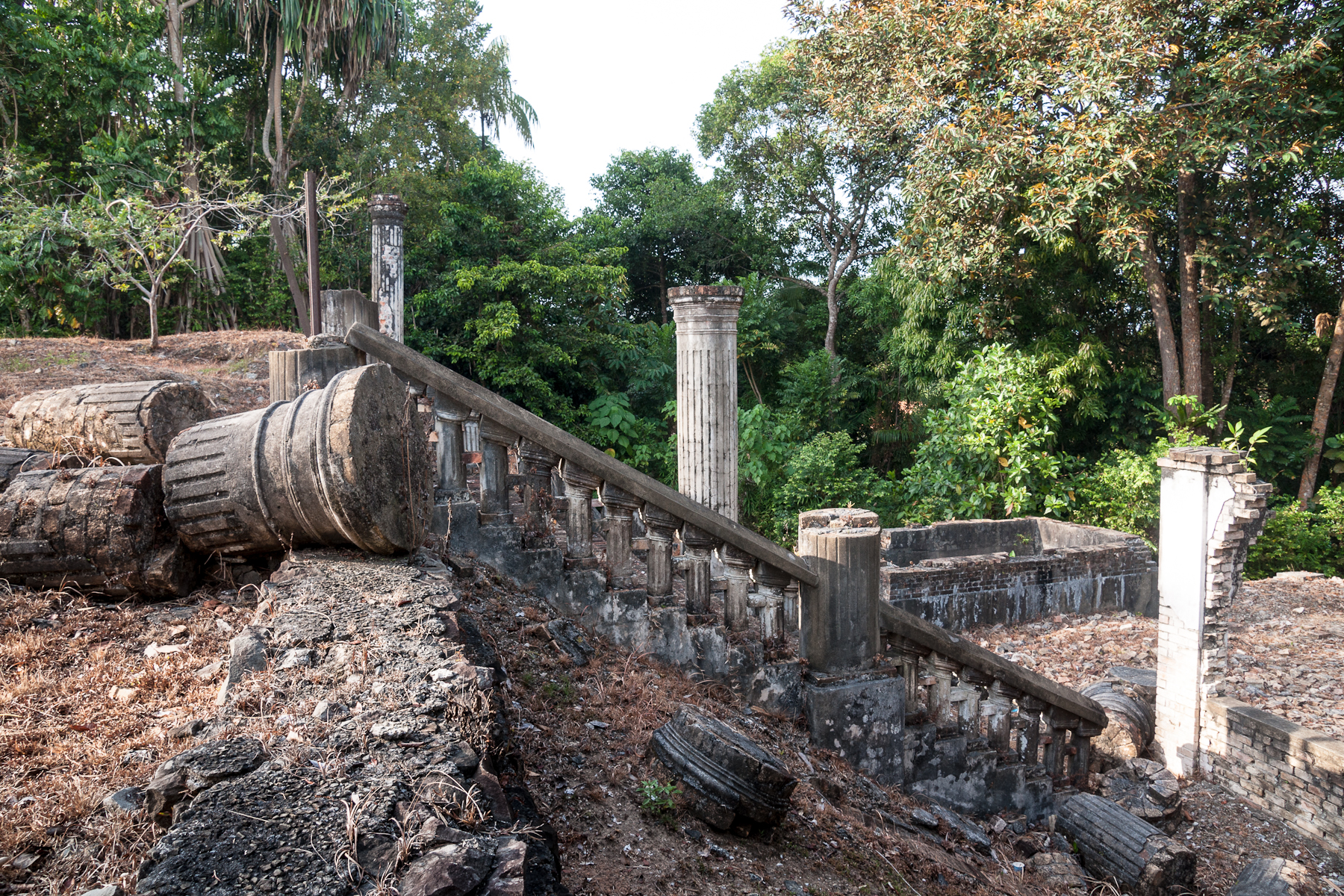
Ruins of Kinarut Mansion

Kinarut is noted for its weekly tamu, an open-air market dominated by native sellers which is held every Saturday. It is also close to Dinawan Island, Lok Kawi Wildlife Centre and the Kinarut Mansion ruins.
