= Kinarut Mansion =

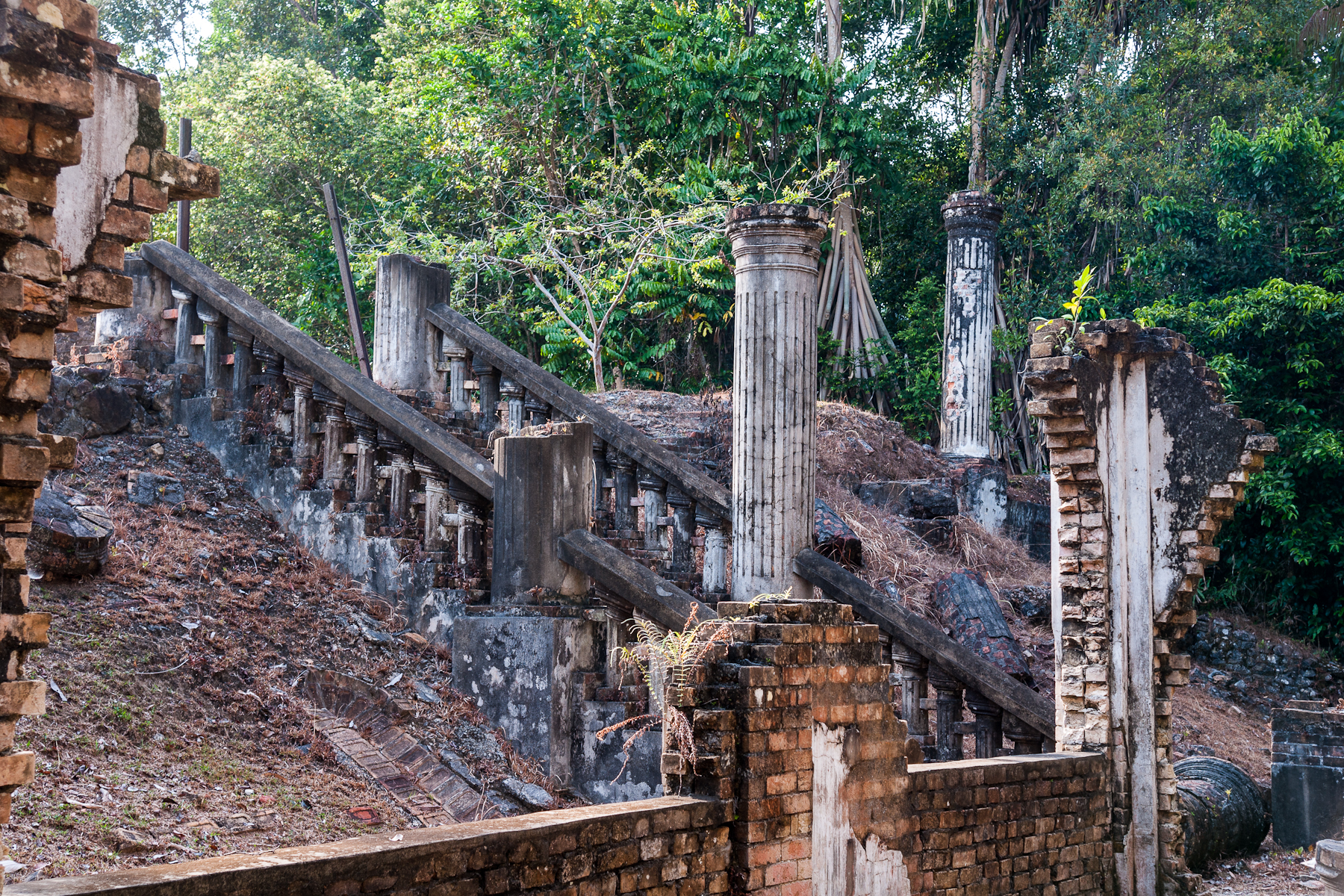
- Stone staircase entrance of the Kinarut Mansion.
- Interactive map of the Kinarut Mansion area

General information
- Status: Destroyed
- Type: Manor house
- Location: Kinarut, Sabah, Malaysia
- Coordinates: 5°48′00″N 116°00′29″E
- Construction started: 1910
- Completed: 1911

Technical details
- Floor count: 1

Kinarut Mansion (Malay: Rumah Besar Kinarut) is the ruins of a former manor house in the Graeco-Roman style near Kinarut in the Malaysian state of Sabah.

== History ==
The building was built in 1910 by German W.F.C. Asimont. Asimont was the first manager of a rubber plantation known as Kinarut Rubber Estate, where the British Society for Manchester North Borneo Ltd located. The plantation is the second largest after Sapong Estate's in the west coast of Sabah and was established in 1910–1911 with an area of more than ten square kilometres. Asimont died 1919 in Surabaya, Dutch East Indies and was buried in Singapore. Soon after, the abandoned house was destroyed by North Borneo Chartered Company authorities in 1923.

On 22 August 1994, it was included as one of the historical sites in Sabah. In 2015, the area of the mansion is currently being upgraded to become one of Sabah's main tourism attractions.

== Background ==
This former manor house is situated on a wooded hill near Kinarut above the Kawang River. Built from 1910 to 1914, the house was one of the few stone houses that existed in North Borneo. It was built of brick with white walls by an Indian architect, who use around 200–300 workers from Java. The manor house with its outdoor facilities spread over an area of about two acres. The main entrance led a 200-metre-long avenue of Greco-Roman columns. The house itself had 45 doors, 152 windows and was illuminated by 42 huge chandeliers.

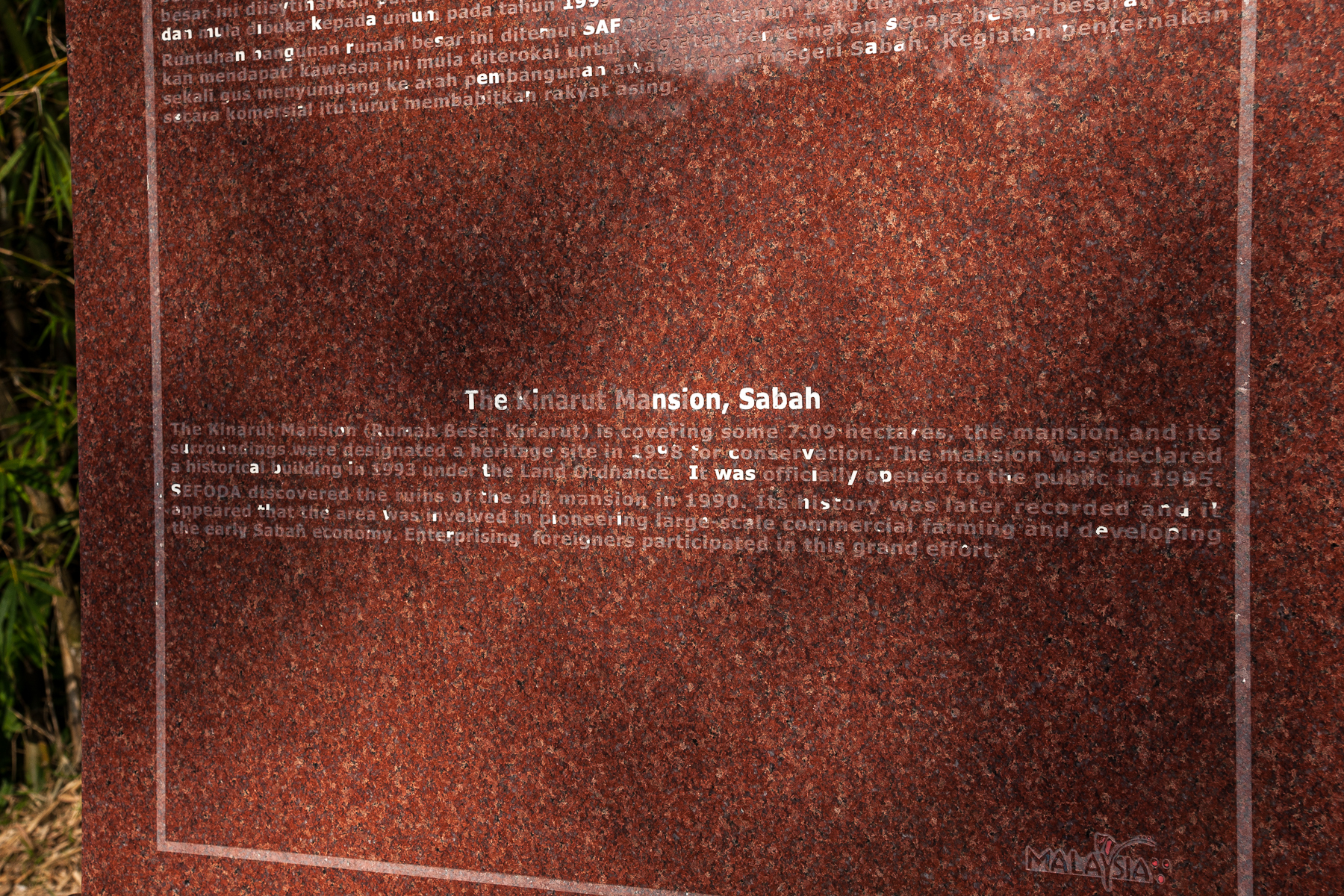
The mansion history inscription.

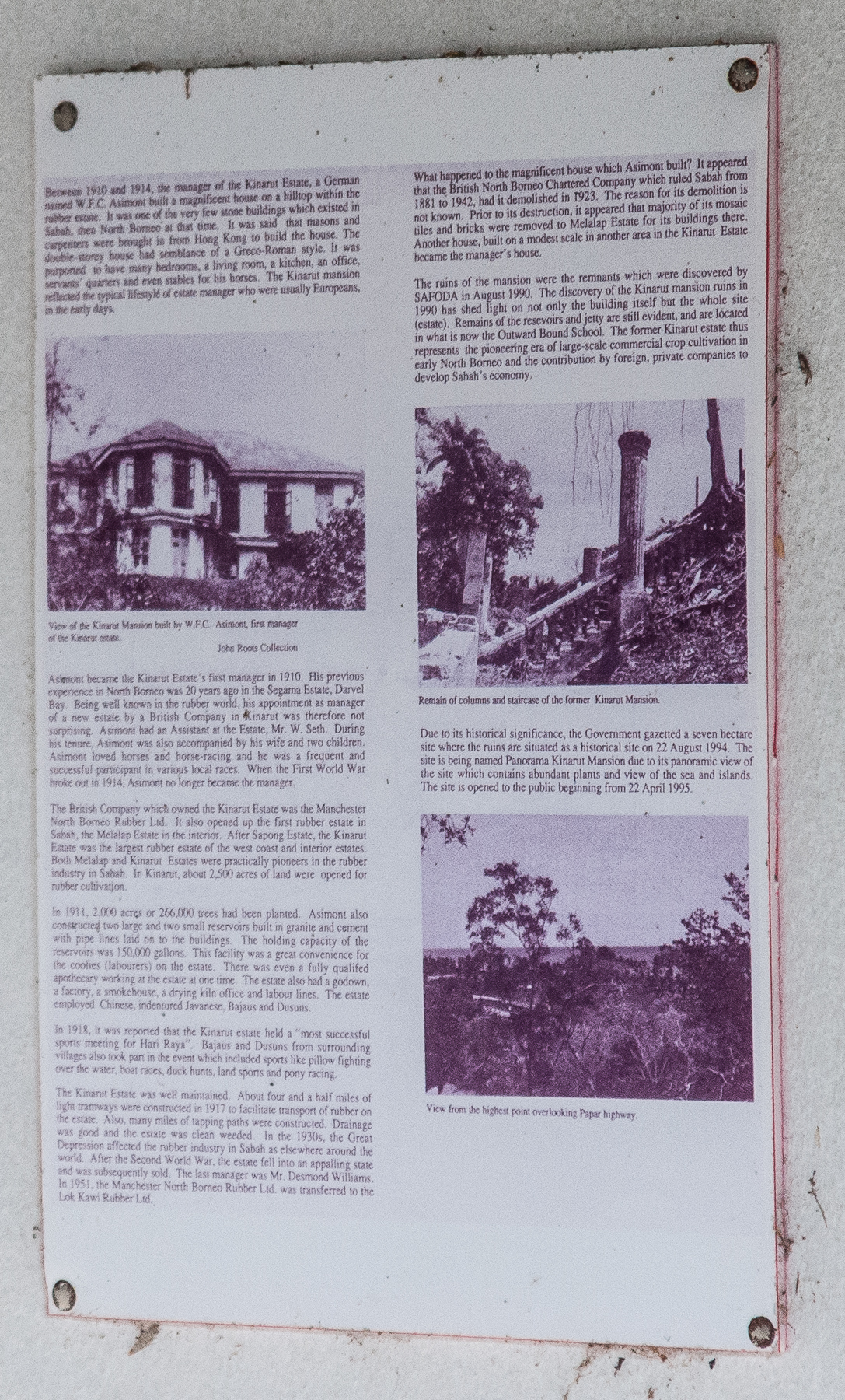
Inscription on the mansion further history.

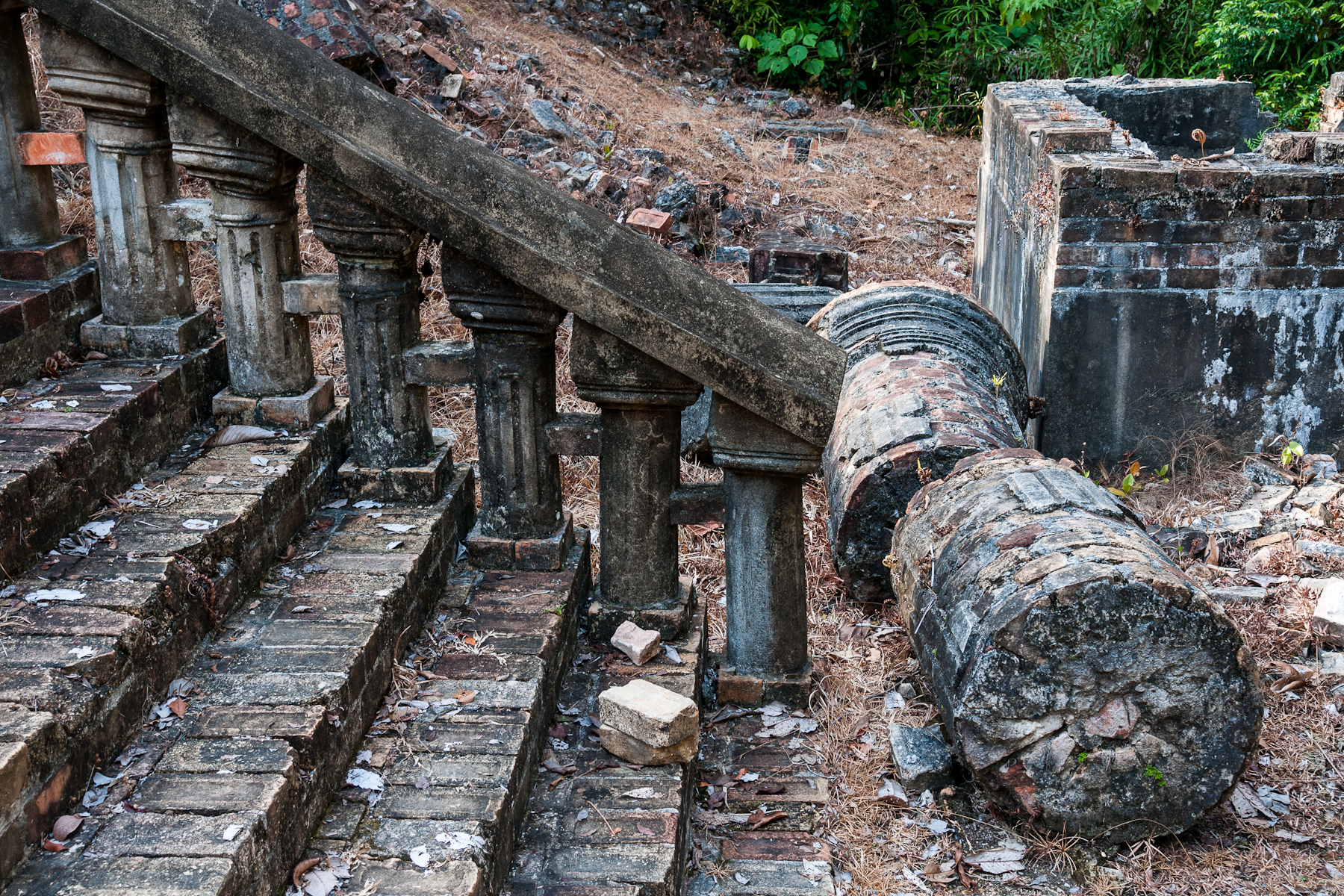
Remains of a Graeco-Roman column.

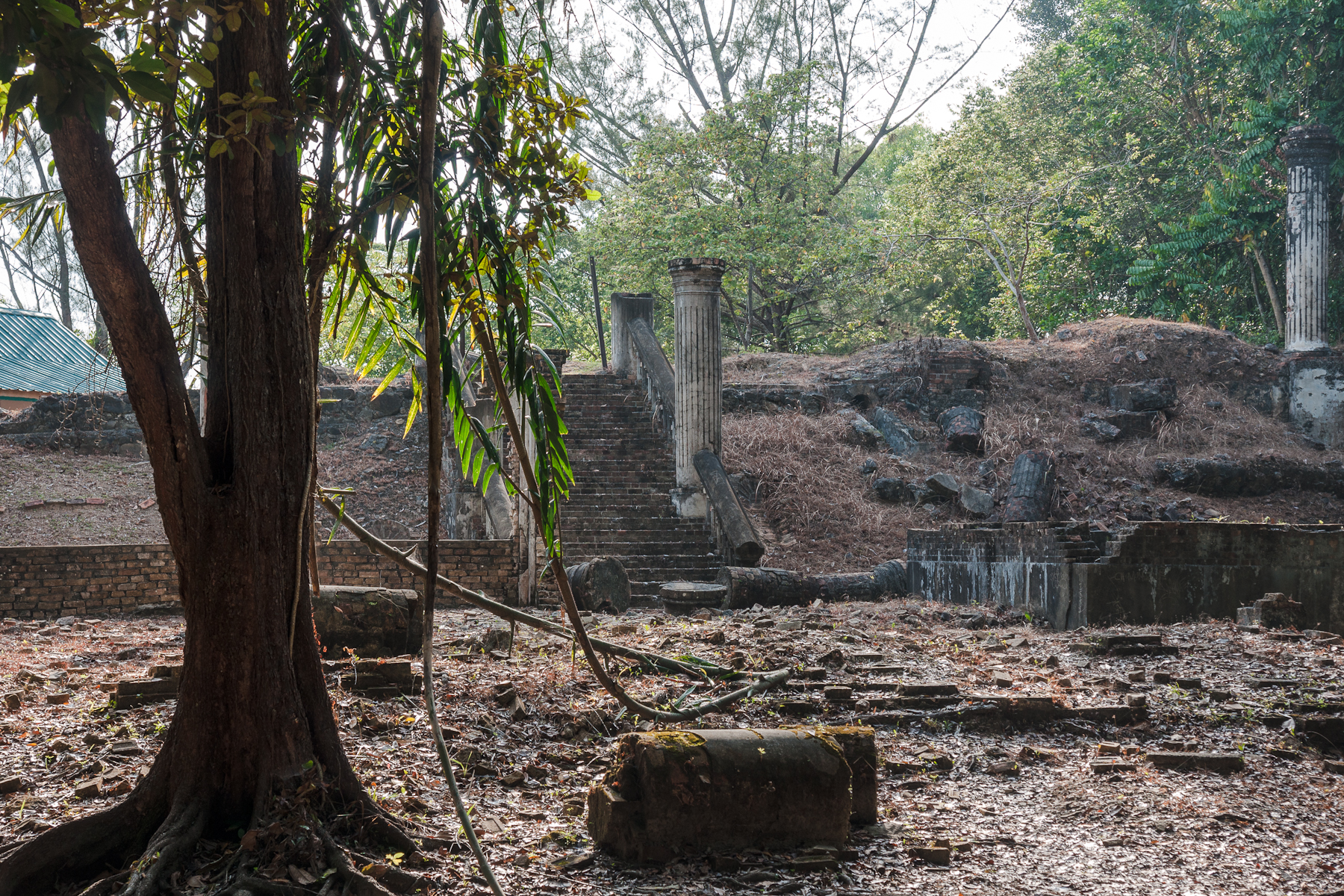
Stairs of the mansion ruins.

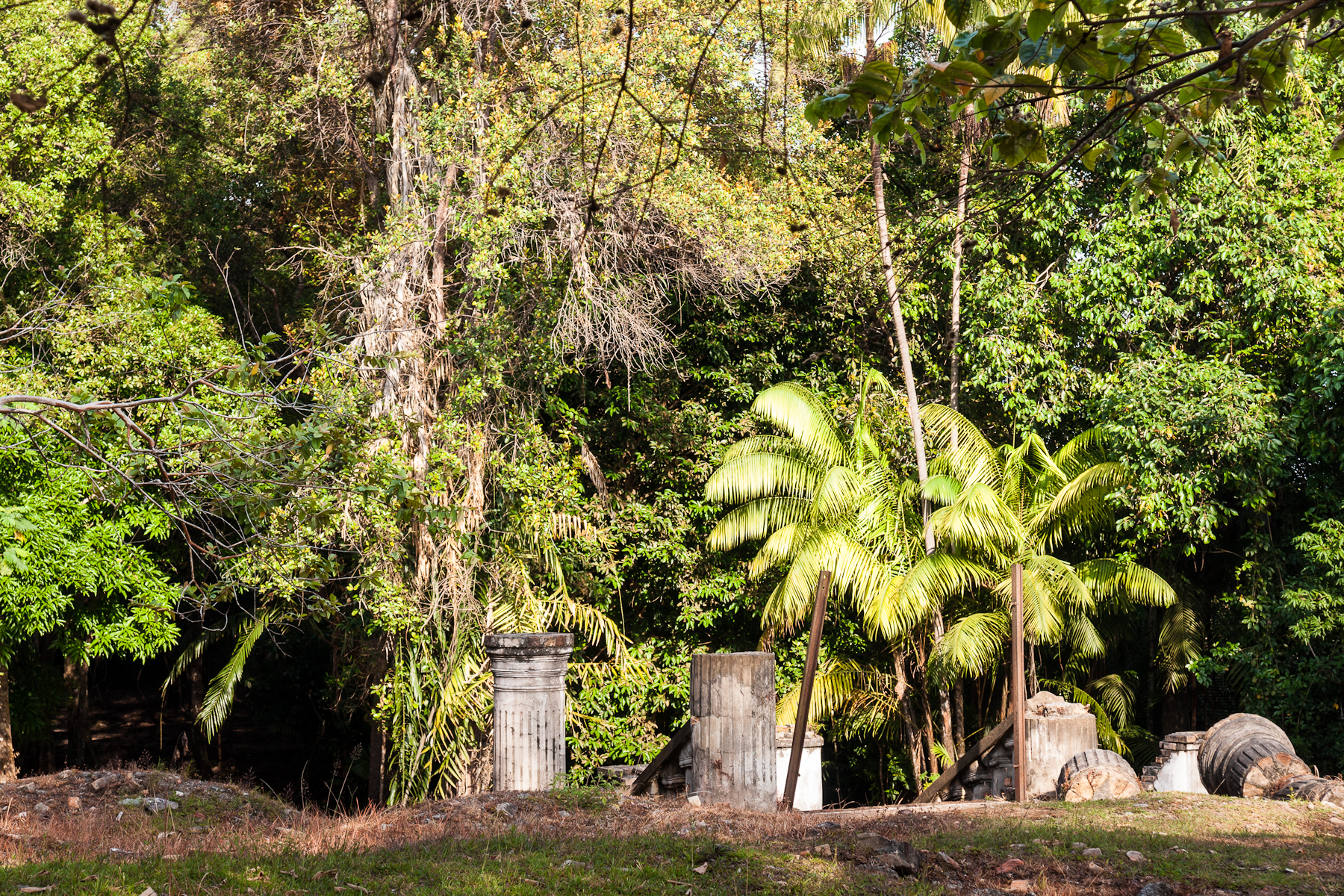
The mansion ruins covered with forest today.

== Haunted reputation ==
Locals living near the mansion area claimed the place is haunted with a "Hantu Tinggi", a type of Malay ghost in the form of a tall tree who is usually disguised as a normal tree in the heavily forested area. Other passersby claimed to have seen a fast moving apparition and hearing the eerie voice of a pontianak, a Malay female ghost at night. These claims were also supported by media crews who covered information about the mansion and mentioned that they felt "something" was following them through their walk in the area.
