= List of ambassadors of Malaysia to the Philippines =

Ambassador of Malaysia to the Philippines
- Incumbent; Norman Muhamad since 18 July 2019
- Style: His Excellency
- Seat: Manila, Philippines
- Appointer: Yang di-Pertuan Agong
- Website: www.kln.gov.my/web/phl_manila/home

The ambassador of Malaysia to the Republic of the Philippines is the head of Malaysia's diplomatic mission to the Philippines. The position has the rank and status of an ambassador extraordinary and plenipotentiary and is based in the Embassy of Malaysia, Manila.

== List of heads of mission ==
=== Ambassadors to the Philippines ===
Ambassador	Term start	Term end
Ibrahim Saad	28 June 2010	5 July 2012
Mohd Zamri Mohd Kassim	4 January 2013	21 January 2016
Raszlan Abdul Rashid	21 August 2016	31 December 2018
Norman Muhamad	18 July 2019	Incumbent

== See also ==
- Malaysia–Philippines relations
