= Filipinos of Malay descent =

Ethnic group

Malays in the Philippines Orang Melayu di Filipina Malay sa Pilipinas Malayu lu sa Pilipinas Malayu ha Pilipinas
Regions with significant populations
- Luzon, Mindanao, Visayas, Sulu Archipelago

Languages
- Old Malay (historically), Malay (Philippine Malay), Visayan languages, Arabic, Maguindanao, other languages of the Philippines, Chavacano, Filipino language, Ilocano, Cebuano

Religion
- Islam, also Animism, Hinduism, Buddhism, Sikhism and Christianity

Related ethnic groups
- Malays, Moro people, Visayans

Malays played a significant role in pre-Hispanic Philippine history. Malay involvement in Philippine history goes back to the Classical Era with the establishment of Rajahnates as well as the Islamic era, in which various sultanates and Islamic states were formed in Mindanao, the Sulu Archipelago, and around Manila.

Malays made large contribution to Philippine history, and influenced modern-day lifestyles of Filipinos. The Malay language was the lingua franca of the archipelago prior to Spanish rule due to the religious history of the Malay Archipelago.

Although the modern Philippines does not have a huge majority or minority of ethnic Malays today, (Filipinos who identified as ethnic Malay make up 0.2% of the total population), the descendants of ethnic Malays have been assimilated into the wider related Austronesian Filipino culture, characterized by Chinese and Spanish influence, and Roman Catholicism, with others into the Moro Muslim population. Malay cultural influence is still strong in the culturally conservative regions of Mindanao, southern Palawan, the Sulu Archipelago, and to some extent in rural of Luzon and the Visayas, where much Malay involvement and intermixing came during the classical era.

In the modern day, the closest cultural population to Malays are the Moro peoples, the native Islamized populations of the Philippines that inhabit Mindanao, Sulu Archipelago, south Palawan, parts of Visayas and Metro Manila and its environs. They follow a culture and lifestyle somewhat similar to Malays (predominantly in dress code and religion), although this culturally differs in the areas that these groups follow traditions native to or unique to the Philippines, such as cuisine, traditional music, and language (which belong to the Visayan, Danao, and Sangiric branches of the Philippine languages, and the Sama–Bajaw languages). At present, Malay is spoken by a minority of Filipinos, particularly in Palawan, Sulu Archipelago and parts of Mindanao as a second language, mostly in the form of trade and creole languages, particularly Sabah Malay.

There is an often a lot of confusion in the Philippines between "ethnic Malays" and "Malay race", a term coined for brown-skinned Austronesian natives of not only the Philippines, but also of Brunei, Indonesia, Malaysia, Singapore, and Southern Thailand. The country had its own Malay nationalism, un-associated with the anti-colonial struggle in the British and Dutch East Indies. The Philippine nationalism occurred towards the end of Spanish occupation and was spearheaded by José Rizal. Unlike the Malay nationalism and "Malayness" in Indonesia which was defined by the ethnic group, and in Malaysia which was defined by Islam as well as being of the ethnic group, Rizal's movement was that of a secular vision to unify the natives of the Malay Archipelago and the Malay Peninsula, believing them to have falsely been divided by colonial powers.

== History ==
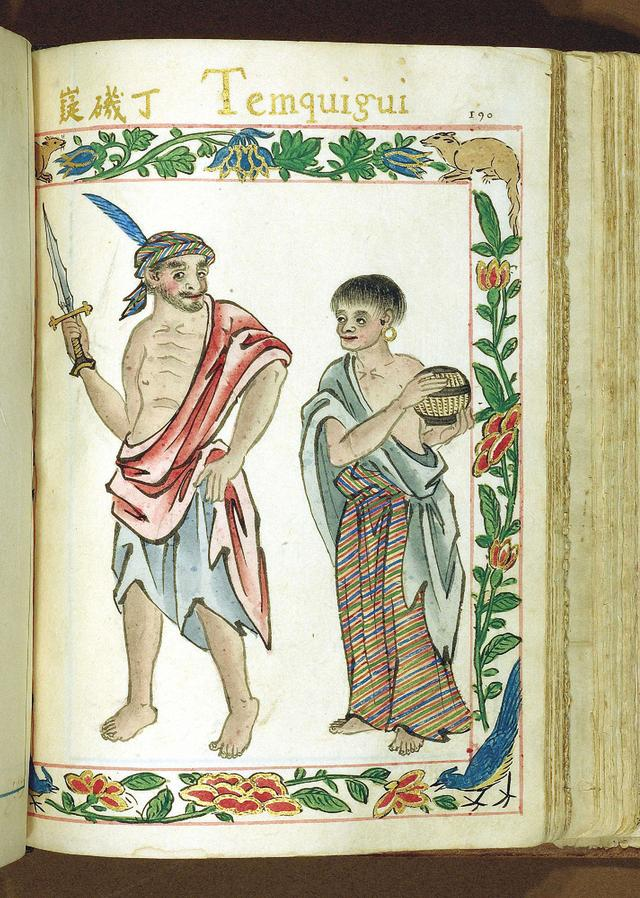
Malays from Terengganu in the Philippines, c. 1590 Boxer Codex

Interaction between the natives of the Philippines and the Malay Srivijaya Kingdom (as well as the Javanese kingdoms of Majapahit and Medang) are recorded by the Laguna Copperplate Inscription, which dates approximately 900 A.D. This steel plate was written in a mix of Old Tagalog, Old Malay and Javanese. Among the Malays, the classical Philippine kingdoms also interacted with other native peoples of Indonesia, including the Minangkabau and Javanese.

The first-recorded Malay in Philippine history was Sri Lumay, although accounts him are mostly in Visayan folklore. Sri Lumay was born in Sumatra, an island in Indonesia with a high Malay-population, and was of mixed Malay and Tamil descent. He settled in somewhere in modern-day Visayas. Sri Lumay established the Rajahnate of Cebu. His sons also ruled nearby regions and kingdoms.

The name "Visayas" originates from the name "Srivijaya", the name of the aforementioned ancient Malay kingdom of the same that was centered in Sumatra and the Malay Peninsula.

Upon the Islamization of the southern Philippines, Sri Lumay was known to have resisted the Islamic expansion, and enacted a scorched-earth policy for the Moro raiders.

In the 16th century, the Islamization of the Alam Melayu (literally "Malay realm") was near-complete and its influence had spilled into the Philippines. Sharif Kabungsuwan, a native of Johore migrated to Mindanao where he preached Islam to the inland natives - and established the Sultanate of Maguindanao. His descendants provided Mindanao with a fierce resistance to Spanish occupation, one of his descendants, Muhammad Dipaduan Kudarat is known as a national hero in the Philippines.

The late 15th century and through 1521 is filled with preachers of Islam, particularly Malays, along with Arabs, Persian, Chinese Muslim and Indian Muslims spreading Islam in the southern Philippines. During the reign of Sultan Bolkiah of Brunei, the Bruneian armies attacked the Kingdom of Tondo and established the Kingdom of Selurong, or Seludong where modern-day Manila is located. This was a Bruneian satellite state, and was placed under the rule of Rajah Sulayman, a native Muslim from the Manila area.

Rajah Sulayman came from a long line of rulers, of mixed Tagalog and Malay descent. His grandfather for example, Salila, was a descendant of the Bolkiah family from Brunei.

Malay became the regional lingua franca of trade and many polities enculturated Islamic Malay customs and governance to varying degrees, including Kapampangans, Tagalogs and other coastal Philippine peoples. According to Bruneian folklore, at around 1500 Sultan Bolkiah launched a successful northward expedition to break Tondo's monopoly as a regional entrepot of the Chinese trade and established Maynila (Selurong) across the Pasig delta, ruled by his heirs as a satellite.

Bruneian influence spread elsewhere around Manila Bay, present-day Batangas, and coastal Mindoro through closer trade and political relations, with a growing overseas Kapampangan-Tagalog population based in Brunei and beyond in Malacca in various professions as traders, sailors, shipbuilders, mercenaries, governors, and slaves.

The Sulu Archipelago was an entrepôt that attracted merchants from south China and various parts of Southeast Asia beginning in the 14th century. The name "Sulu" is attested in Chinese historical records as early as 1349, during the late Yuan dynasty (1271–1368), suggesting trade relations around this time. Trade continued into the early Ming dynasty (1368–1644); envoys were sent in several missions to China to trade and pay tribute to the emperor. Sulu merchants often exchanged goods with Chinese Muslims, and also traded with Muslims of Arab, Persian, Malay, or Indian descent. Islamic historian Cesar Adib Majul argues that Islam was introduced to the Sulu Archipelago in the late 14th century by Chinese and Arab merchants and missionaries from Ming China. The seven Arab missionaries were called "Lumpang Basih" by the Tausug, and were Sunni Sufi scholars from the Ba 'Alawi sada of Yemen.

Around this time, a notable Arab judge, Sunni Sufi and religious scholar Karim ul-Makhdum (Note: Also Karimul Makhdum, Karimal Makdum or Makhdum Karim among others. Makhdum came from the Arabic word makhdūmīn, which means "master".) from Mecca arrived in Malacca. He preached Islam, particularly the Ash'ari Aqeeda and Shafi'i Madh'hab as well as the Qadiriyya Tariqa, and many citizens, including the ruler of Malacca, converted to Islam. A sultan of Brunei, Sultan Bolkiah married a princess (dayang-dayang) of Sulu, Puteri Laila Menchanai, and they became the grandparents of the Muslim prince of Maynila, Rajah Matanda. Manila was a Muslim city-state and vassal to Brunei before the Spanish colonized it and converted it from Islam to Christianity. Islamic Manila ended after the failed attack of Tarik Sulayman, a Muslim Kapampangan commander, in the failure of the Conspiracy of the Maharlikas, when the formerly Muslim Manila nobility attempted a secret alliance with the Japanese shogunate and Bruneiean sultanate (together with her Manila and Sulu allies) to expel the Spaniards from the Philippines. Many Tausugs and other native Muslims of Sulu Sultanate already interacted with Kapampangan and Tagalog Muslims called Luzones based in Brunei, and there were intermarriages between them. The Spanish had native allies against the former Muslims they conquered like Hindu Tondo which resisted Islam when Brunei invaded and established Manila as a Muslim city-state to supplant Hindu Tondo.

In 1521, Ferdinand Magellan arrived in Visayas where he encountered Rajah Humabon, one of Sri Lumay's descendants. Humabon accepted Roman Catholicism, and urged his rival Lapulapu to allow Europeans. Magellan used his Malay servant, Enrique of Malacca to converse with the natives. Magellan perished in the Battle of Mactan although Enrique's fate was unknown.

=== Pan-Malayan movement ===
Throughout the 300 years of Spanish colonization, any sort of Malay identity was lost in assimilation, even in the Muslim south where Arabic was the favored and promoted language over Malay. José Rizal, an avid pan-Malayan nationalist spearheaded a movement to "re-unite" the natives of the archipelago with that of its southern neighbors in what would today become the countries of Malaysia, Indonesia, Brunei, Singapore and Thailand.

This type of "Malayan" movement was significantly different than the one that took place in British Malaya and the Dutch East Indies. While those movements were focused on the lone ethnic group originating from Sumatra and the Malay Peninsula, Rizal envisioned a larger pan-Austronesian nation, what would later become coined as the Malay race. Rizal's movement was known as the "Indios Bravos", ("Brave Indians"). Rizal had actually tried to learn Malay, but he was executed in 1896, therefore never getting a chance to fully revive the Malay language in the Philippines; President Manuel L. Quezon chose Tagalog as the basis for the evolution and adoption of the national language of the Philippines on December 30, 1937.

Wenceslao Vinzons, a Filipino politician and guerrilla leader during World War II, was another noted pan-Malayan nationalist. He found the Perhimpoenan Orang Melayu ("Pan Malay Alliance") at the University of the Philippines.

It is for this reason that definition of "Malay" in the Philippines differ from that of its southern neighbors, therefore making it difficult to get an accurate estimate of who contains descent from the actual ethnic group. As for "Malay race", this would cover approximately 90,000,000 natives in the Philippines.

== Religion ==
Historically, the Malays in the Philippines followed the religious trend of Maritime Southeast Asia. They followed a mix of Animism, Hinduism, Buddhism and Paganism. They were introduced to cultural influences from the Indian subcontinent.

In the late 15th century throughout the 16th century, the Islamisation of the Malay realm also influenced the Philippines. Sharif Kabungsuwan, a Johor-born native of Malay and Arab descent introduced Islam to the archipelago. Rajah Sulayman, the ruler of Seludong, was a Muslim convert.

During the Spanish occupation, a small minority of Malays were converted to Christianity, Roman Catholicism to be specific. Enrique of Malacca, a Malaccan Malay who accompanied the Portuguese conquistador Ferdinand Magellan to Cebu, was a convert to Roman Catholicism, though he wasn't converted in the Philippines and was already a Catholic convert upon arrival. Rajah Humabon, a descendant of Sri Lumay, as well as Lakan Dula of Tondo, both converted to Catholicism and were given the names "Carlos".

== Modern misconceptions ==
It is understood in Indonesia and Malaysia that Malays, as in the ethnic group, are those who speak Malay as a native language.

In Indonesia, Malay and Indonesian are regarded as two different languages. The Malay race, on the other hand, is not the same as the ethnic group, and simply refers to the Austronesian natives of Maritime Southeast Asia, though the ethnic Malays are part of the bigger Malay race.

In the Philippines, there is misconception and often mixing between the two definitions. Filipinos consider Malays as being the natives of the Philippines, Indonesia, Malaysia and Brunei. Consequently, Filipinos consider themselves Malay when in reality, they are referring to the Malay race. Some Filipinos in Singapore would like to be categorised as Malay, contra Singaporean policy.

This leads to misconceptions about the ancient rulers of the Philippines. Lapulapu for example is sometimes claimed to have been a Malay Muslim, though he was most probably ethnically Cebuano and his religious background most probably animist like his neighboring ruler Rajah Humabon. Though the Bangsamoro follows a Malay-influenced culture, they are also mistakenly called Malays by the majority of Christian Filipinos.

José Rizal, the Philippines' most regarded national hero is often called the "Pride of the Malay Race". The pride of the Malay race, a biography of José Rizal This gave rise to a political concept known as Maphilindo, a proposed confederation that would consist of Philippines, Indonesia and Malaysia. With the creation of ASEAN, this proposal never manifested.

== Notable people ==
- Sri Lumay - founder of the Rajahnate of Cebu, was said to have come from Sumatra of Malay descent
- Rajah Salila - king of Tondo, descendant of the Bruneian royal family of Bolkiah
- Rajah Sulayman - also known as Rajah Sulaiman III, descendant of Salila, of mixed Bruneian and Tagalog descent
- Lakan Dula - brother of Rajah Sulayman
- Rajah Humabon - descendant of Sri Lumay and rajah of Cebu, made contact with Ferdinand Magellan and embraced Roman Catholicism, of mixed Malay and Cebuano descent
- Sharif Kabungsuwan - founder of the Sultanate of Maguindanao, born in Johore of Malay and Arab descent
- Muhammad Kudarat - grandson of Kabungsuwan, halted Latinization of Mindanao by Spanish conquerors
- Jamalul Kiram III - claimant heir to the Sultanate of Sulu, though the majority of his descent was Tausūg, he claimed to have a common ancestor with Brunei's current sultan Hassanal Bolkiah. This was however been denied by the Bruneian counterparts.

== See also ==
- Ethnic Malays
- Malay language in the Philippines
- Old Malay
- Islam in the Philippines
- Indonesians in the Philippines
- Laguna Copperplate Inscription
- Moro people
- Brunei–Philippines relations
- Indonesia–Philippines relations
- Malaysia–Philippines relations
- Rajahnate of Cebu
- Kingdom of Maynila
- Sultanate of Maguindanao

== Sources ==
- Abinales, P. N.; Amoroso, Donna J. (2005). State and Society in the Philippines. Rowman & Littlefield. pp. 43–45. ISBN 978-0-7425-1024-1.
- Donoso, Isaac (2022). "The Qur'an in the Spanish Philippines". In García-Arenal, Mercedes; Wiegers, Gerard (eds.). The Iberian Qur'an: From the Middle Ages to Modern Times. De Gruyter. pp. 499–532. doi:10.1515/9783110778847-019. ISBN 978-3-11-077884-7.
- Gunn, Geoffrey C. (2011). History Without Borders: The Making of an Asian World Region, 1000–1800. Hong Kong University Press. pp. 91–95. ISBN 9789888083343.
- Saleeby, Najeeb Mitry (1908), The History of Sulu, Bureau of Printing
