= Albert Nico =

Filipino-Malaysian hairstylist

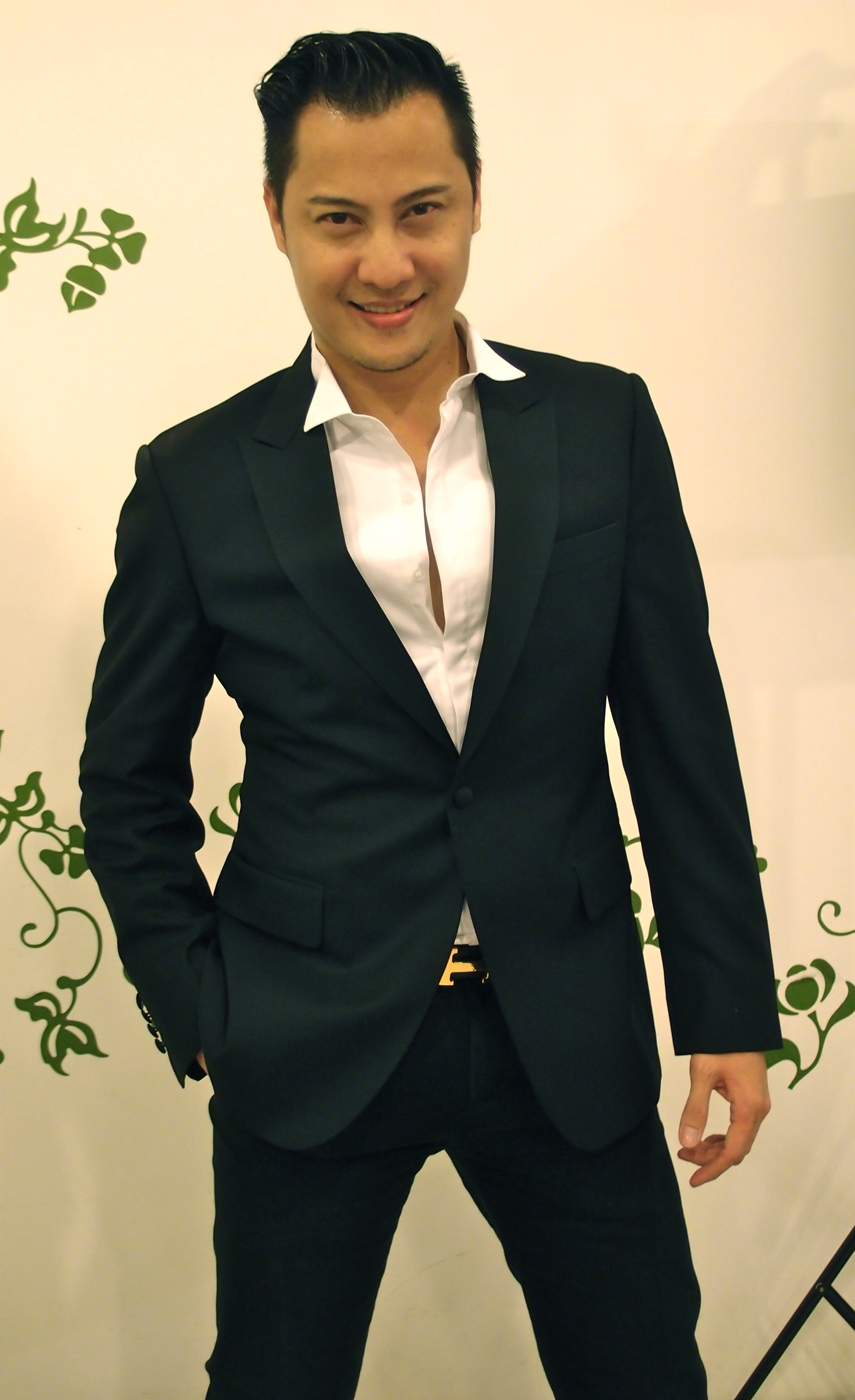
- Occupation: Hairstylist
- Board member of: Malaysian Hairdressing Association, Vice President
- Website: www.albertnico.com

Albert Nico is a Filipino-Malaysian hairstylist. His clients have included members of the royal families of Malaysia, as well as local celebrities and socialites.

== Career ==
At the age of 15, Nico worked as a shampoo boy at a local hair salon called Hotheads Salon and then picked up basic hairstyling skills.

In 1980, when Nico was 20 years old, he took over the business at Hotheads Salon. He also financially supported himself through part-time modeling to pursue formal hairstyling education in Hong Kong.

Nico conducted various hairstyling seminars and was invited to be one of the judges at international hairstyling competitions that were held locally and globally. His exposures include demonstrating hairstyling at hairdressing events globally.

He is also one of the L’Oreal Professionel Artistic Ambassadors.

Nico received the Estetica Cover Award 2000 by Estetica Magazine in Italy. In year 2008, Hotheads salon rebrand to Albert Nico Boutique Salon, located in Kuala Lumpur, Bukit Bintang. His work has been published in Vogue Italia.

== Publication ==
In 2012, Nico issued a self-published book, When Dreams Come Alive, containing his memoirs, quotes, testimonials, and photographs. The book has a foreword by Datuk Dr. Paddy Bowie.

== Philanthropy Interest ==
In 2009, Nico provided haircuts at the Seri Setia Old Folks Home, together with the rest of his trainees. Nico also collaborated with his friends to include a manicure and pedicure sessions for the elderly too. Nico also participated in the 'Hairdressers Against Aids' campaign by L'Oreal.
