= Malaysia–Philippines relations =

- Malaysia: Philippines

Diplomatic mission
- Malaysian Embassy, Makati: Filipino Embassy, Kuala Lumpur

Envoy
- Ambassador Raszlan Abdul Rashid: Ambassador Charles C. Jose

Malaysia–Philippines relations (Malay: Hubungan Malaysia dan Filipina; Filipino: Ugnayang Malaysia at Pilipinas) refers to the bilateral relations between Malaysia and the Philippines. The Philippines has an embassy in Kuala Lumpur, and Malaysia has an embassy in Makati and a consulate general in Davao City. The people of the two neighbouring countries have a long history of cultural and political relations.

They are both founding members of the Association of Southeast Asian Nations, both countries are of Malayo-Polynesian stock, and both are important trading partners. The two countries have participated in joint conservation and security measures in the Sulu Sea, which lies between the two countries.

Malaysia has assisted in peacekeeping efforts in Mindanao, although in the past the attempt of President Ferdinand Marcos to retake eastern Sabah under the claim of the Sultanate of Sulu by forces through "Operation Merdeka" failed badly. Following the arrest of Nur Misuari in 2001, Malaysia Prime Minister Mahathir Mohamad said in a statement that they previously funded and supported the insurgencies in Mindanao, to fight against the Philippines, which also economically devastated the Moro people, but now have ceased doing so. Both countries are now involved in the ongoing disputes over ownership of the Spratly Islands and parts of Sabah.

== History ==
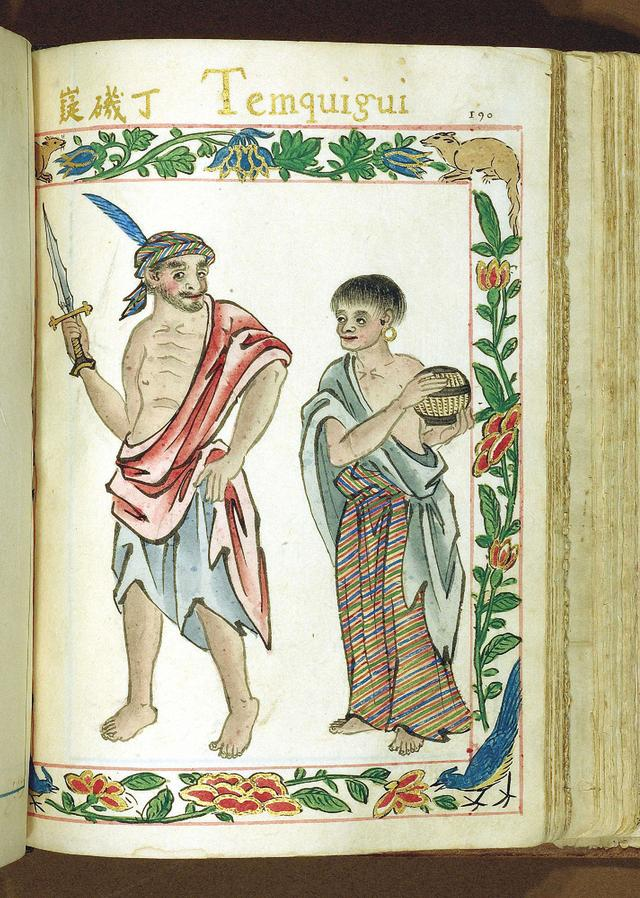
Malays from Terengganu in the Philippines, c. 1590 Boxer Codex

Both Malaysia and the Philippines was once part of the Maritime Jade Road. In the precolonial era, before Portugal then the United Kingdom conquered Malaysia and before Spain then the United States conquered the Philippines, the Malaysian and Philippine kingdoms had Datus, Rajahs and Sultans who intermarried with each other and were related. In the Philippines, the Kedatuan of Madja-as were founded by Datus from the collapsing Malay Peninsula and Sumatra centered Srivijaya Empire which extended even to Brunei (At their colony in Vijayapura at Sarawak), was a rump state of Srivijaya in the Visayas islands at the Philippines, the Rajah Makatunao whom the Visayan 10 Datus of the Kedatuan of Madja-as rebelled against was said to be Rajah Tugao, leader of the Melanao nation in Sarawak. Then the Rajahnate of Cebu, otherwise known as the Hindu nation of Sokbu (束務) in ancient Chinese records, which had a Sanskrit-Tamil named capital: "Singhapala" (சிங்கப்பூர்) meaning "Lion-City" which is the same root word as Malaysia's neighbor, Singapore, was founded by a half Malay and half Tamil from Sumatra named Sri Lumay; while the founder of the Sultanate of Maguindanao (کسلطانن ماڬيندناو), Sharif Kabungsuwan, who ruled in the Philippines, was born from what is now the Malaysian state of Johor ( کسلطانن جوهر ); The Sultans and Rajahs of Malacca, Johor, Brunei, Banjar, and Sambas in what is now Malaysia and the Sultans of Sulu, Maguindanao, Lanao and Manila, as well as the Rajahs of Cebu and Butuan at the Philippines, also intermarried each other. Migration wasn't one-way though, Malaysia also had Filipino immigrants, some of whom were called Luzones and they had administrative positions and commercial networks, as in the case of Regimo Diraja who was a Governor/Temenggong (تمڠݢوڠ) in the Sultanate of Malacca, another Filipino, was Surya Diraja who was a shipping magnate based in Malacca that sent 175 tons of pepper to China annually. There is also Mjmjam in Northwest Malaysia (Now the state of Perak), which hosted a colony of Luzones (Filipinos). The Portuguese noted that Lução (Filipino) soldiers were in every garrison of Malaca, prized for their seamanship and ferocity in skirmishes with the Johor fleet. And it was written in Gaspar Correia's, Lendas da Índia (Acad. das Ciências de Lisboa, 1858–64) Vol. 1, pp. 312–318 (Livro III, cap. LV) Malacca restoration (1526): "When the Sultan of Malacca fled, he took refuge with a Luções chieftain; fifty Lução ships then returned him to power, fighting their way through Johor’s blockade." There were lively commercial and population exchanges between what is now the Philippines and Malaysia during the precolonial period, however, the onset of Western colonization broke the trade and political links between the nations of the two areas as Malaysia fell under Portuguese and then British Imperialism while the Philippines fell to Spanish rule.

Eventually, the Latin American Wars of Independence inspired the revolt of Andres Novales as Latin American immigrants and military exiles to the Philippines: from Mexico, Colombia, Venezuela, Peru, Chile, Argentina and Costa Rica, supported Andres Novales' revolt against Spain, which though defeated, inspired the successful Philippine Revolution against the Spanish Empire which created the First Philippine Republic. However, it was crushed by an invasion of the United States. Nevertheless, the Philippines was eventually granted by the United States the status of independence after the devastation of the Japanese occupation. The Malaysians on the other hand, supported by Chinese and Indians, also fought for their independence from British rule during the Malayan Emergency. The British thereafter promised eventual independence in the aftermath of the Japanese invasion.

In 1959, shortly after, the Federation of Malaya, the predecessor state of Malaysia, became independent, the Philippines established a legation in Kuala Lumpur. Both countries are current members of the Association of Southeast Asian Nations, and the Asian Union. In 1961, the Philippine legation was elevated into an embassy. On the same year, then Philippine President Carlos P. Garcia made a state visit to Malaya where he discussed the formation of an Association of Southeast Asian Nations (ASEAN) with then Malayan Prime Minister Tunku Abdul Rahman. The ASEAN was founded on 8 August 1967 by five Southeast Asian states including then Malaya and the Philippines.

Together with the Indonesia, the two countries were also members of Maphilindo, a short-lived nonpolitical union formed during a summit in Manila from 31 July to 5 August 1963. The organisation was dismantled after one month, partly due to Indonesia's policy of Konfrontasi with Malaysia. The two countries co-operate closely in many areas.

== Diplomatic relations ==
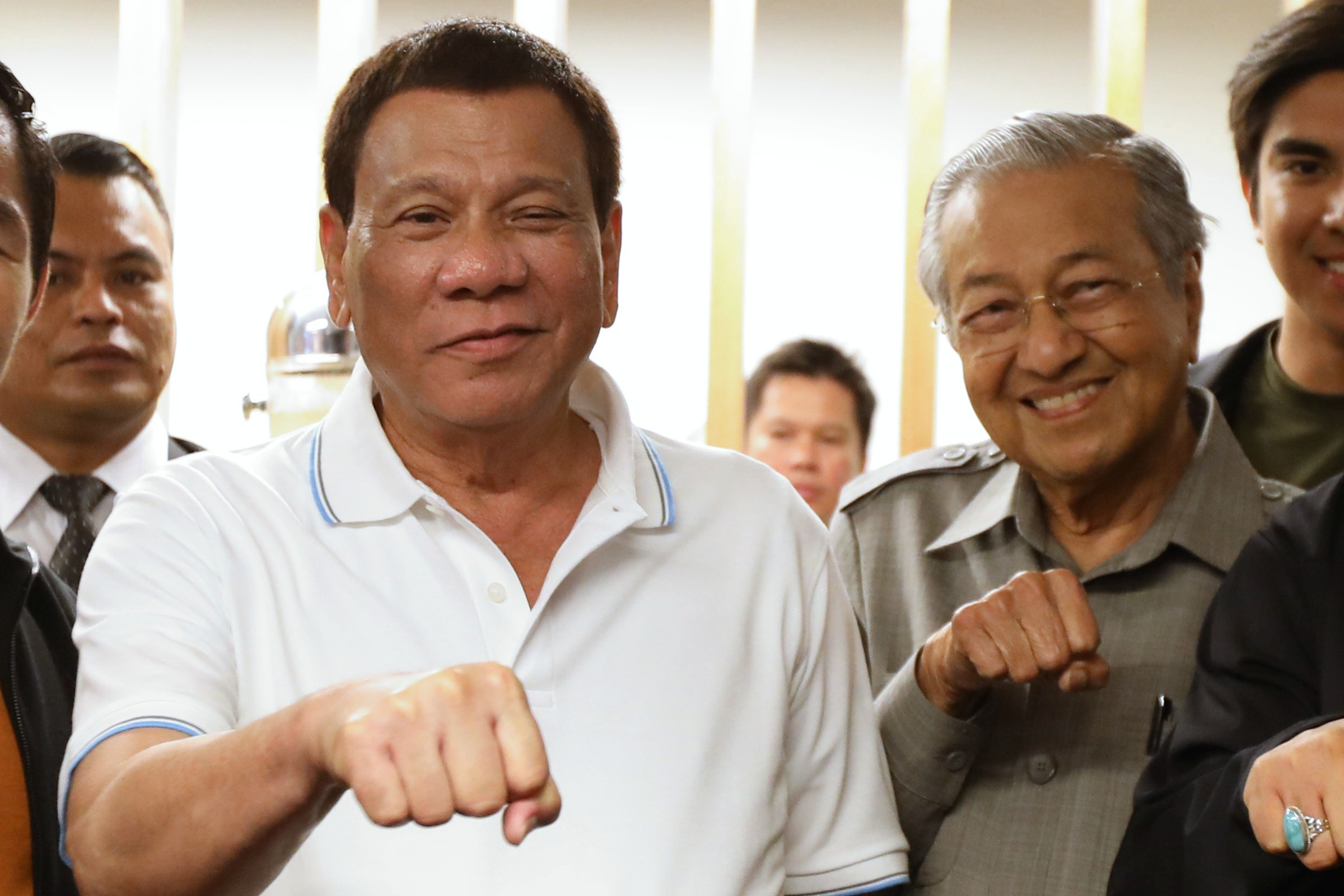
President of the Philippines Rodrigo Duterte and Prime Minister of Malaysia Mahathir Mohamad in Kuala Lumpur, 15 July 2018

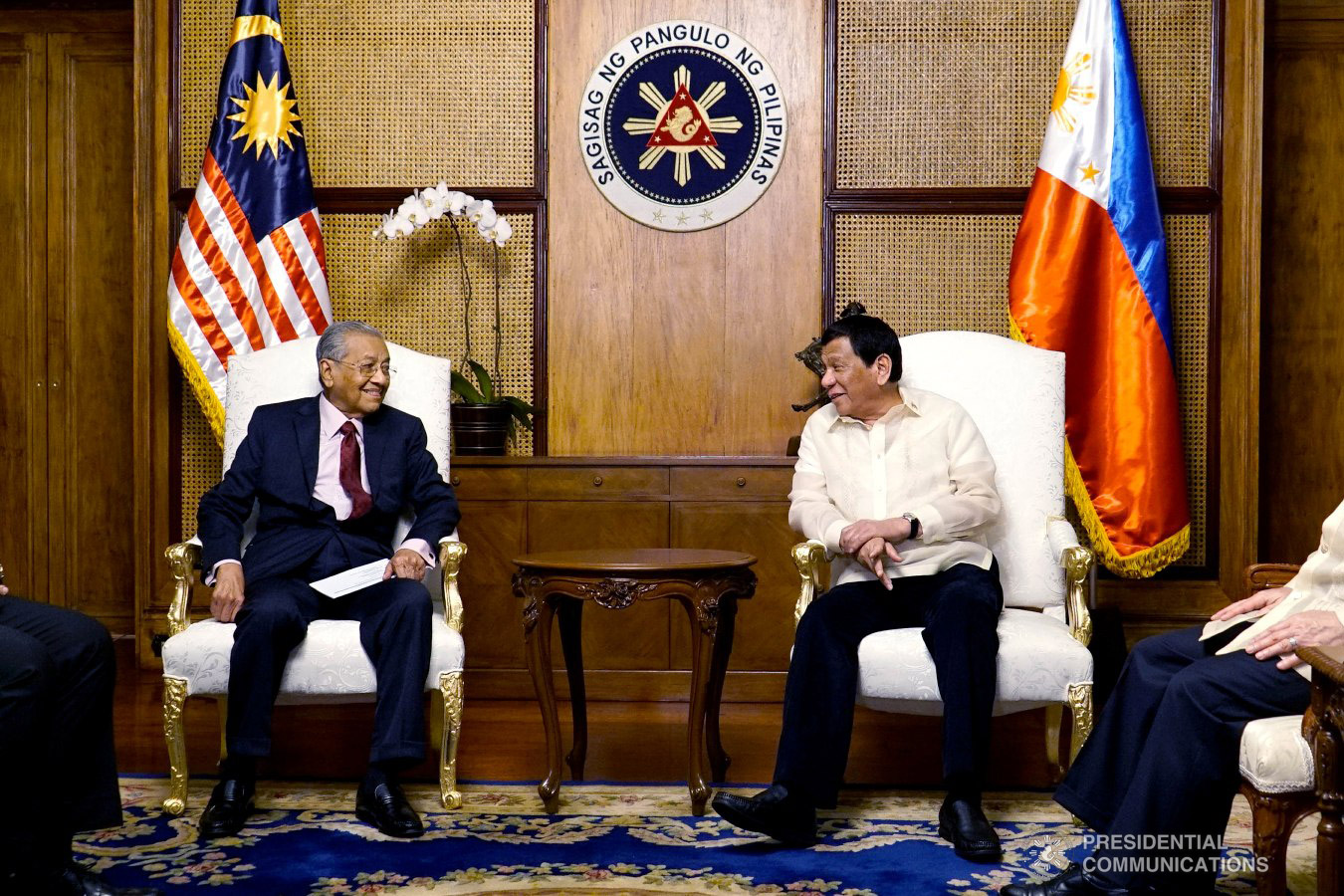
Mahathir meets with Duterte in Malacañang Palace, 7 March 2019

=== Cultural ===
The people of the island complex that includes Malaysia, Indonesia and the Philippines are ethnically similar, with most speaking closely related Malayo-Polynesian languages. Both countries also have large Chinese minorities, who often maintain close cross-border ties.

=== Economic ===
Malaysia and the Philippines are important trading partners. In 2002, the Philippines was the 16th largest export market and the 9th largest import market of Malaysia. Malaysia on the other hand is the 7th largest export market and 8th largest import market of the Philippines. Malaysia is also second main source of foreign investments for the Philippines among all of the members of the ASEAN countries. There is also a Malaysia Philippines Business Council.

=== Labour and domestic workers ===
Most Filipinos near the border have been traditionally engaging in barter trade with the coastal people in eastern Sabah since the Sultanate of Sulu period and maintains close relationship between them with a constant movement of people from the southern Philippines to Sabah. The barter system was stopped in 2016 when Malaysia close its border prior to the persistent kidnapping of its tourists and citizens by militant groups based in the southern Philippines. There are many transient workers from the Philippines in Malaysia, subject to periodic expulsions by Malaysia due to overstaying and involved in crimes.

=== Marine conservation and security collaboration ===
Malaysia and the Philippines have participated in joint conservation measures in the Sulu Sea, which lies between the two countries. Both countries, together with Indonesia are working together to secure Sulu Sea against piracy and extremist militant groups based in the southern Philippines such as the Abu Sayyaf.

=== Aid from Malaysia ===
During the 2013 Bohol earthquake, the Malaysian Government has donated a total of MYR100,000($31,000) for children affected by the disaster. While after the Typhoon Haiyan hit Philippines, the Malaysian Defence Minister Hishammuddin Hussein has quickly contacted the Philippine Defense Secretary Voltaire Gazmin to determine the aid required. Malaysian Filipinos communities also help to collect relief items to be sent to the country. By 13 November, the Malaysian Government has donated a total of $1 million along with the sending of essential items such as food and medicines worth $310 thousand using the RMAF Charlie C-130 aircraft. One of Malaysian major commercial bank Maybank also contributed to donate $330,000 to the Philippine Red Cross along with the arriving of the Malaysian disaster relief team. While on 22 November, the Malaysian Red Crescent has raised a total of $55,000 donations from the Malaysian citizens and deploy a Rapid Deployment Squad to the Philippines. In 2014, the Malaysian state of Sarawak also had delivered P1.32M to help the Yolanda (Haiyan) typhoon survivors to continue their lives.

Malaysia also become the main facilitator for the Framework Agreement on the Bangsamoro to create peace and establish the Bangsamoro area in Southern Philippines, but the peace process was put on hold in 2015 after the killing of 44 Special Action Force Filipino soldiers by Islamic insurgents.

Following the Battle of Marawi, the Malaysian Armed Forces mulling to send humanitarian relief for the civilians in the city. Through the country RMAF A400M, food and medical supplies are being sent for the city internally-displaced residents, with more humanitarian aid are being promised as the situation worsened.

== Disputes and diplomatic incidents ==
=== Sabah dispute ===
The Philippines objected to the inclusion of North Borneo in a proposed federation with Malaya, claiming it had sovereignty over parts of North Borneo due to inheriting the claims of the Sulu Sultanate. Under the July 1963 Manila Accord, Malaya committed to ensuring that the federation had support within North Borneo. A United Nations factfinding mission concluded that federation did have local support, and the federation of Malaysia was created on 16 September 1963. The next day, the Philippines objected at the United Nations to a delegate from "Malaysia" sitting in the seat of "Malaya". The Philippines broke off ties, and did not recognise Malaysia.

Between September 1963 and May 1964, diplomatic relations between the two countries were suspended. Relations were suspended again, due to the same issue, between 1968 and 1969.

In February 2013, a group of armed men claiming to have been sent by Jamalul Kiram III, a self-proclaimed Sultanate of Sulu have landed in Sabah which led to an armed clashed with the Malaysian security forces. During the standoff, at least 56 Sulu forces were killed including 6 civilians and 10 Malaysian forces. His desperate action were widely criticised by both Sabah residents and Filipino migrants and expatriates in Sabah as the main cause for the increase of Anti-Filipino sentiment, negative perceptions and discrimination towards Filipinos in the state. This discrimination was a result of Filipino immigrants to Sabah fleeing the violence of the Moro conflict which destroyed their homes in Mindanao and Sulu; a conflict originated from the atrocities committed during Ferdinand Marcos dictatorship in the 1970s under his Martial Law, which include massacres and abuses towards the Muslim community in Southern Mindanao. Albeit Martial Law was only a response to the formation of the MNLF insurgent group supported by the Malaysian government, to declare terrorism against the Philippines. Filipino refugees also feel trapped as the Malaysian government refuse granting citizenship to many such refugees, classfying them as a stateless people.

The Philippine government offered numerous attempts to Malaysia to resolve the dispute through an International Court of Justice (ICJ) ruling in the United Nations, although recent Philippine government attempt for intervention on the Ligitan and Sipadan dispute between Malaysia and Indonesia on the basis of its claim to Sabah was rejected by the ICJ in 2002. In 2016, Malaysia officially closed its Sabah borders from the Philippines, effectively rising the cost of goods in three provinces in the southern Philippines, namely, Tawi-Tawi, Sulu, and Basilan prior to the infiltration of illegal immigrants and persistent kidnapping by militant groups based in the southern Philippines. In the same year, the Filipino President Rodrigo Duterte announced in a live telecast that his new administration will pursue the Philippine claim on eastern Sabah through a peaceful dialogue with the Malaysian government. However, prior to the recent meeting between Malaysian Prime Minister Najib Razak and President Duterte in late 2016, both leaders have agreed to set aside the issues on "back burner" as President Duterte want to focus more to the social condition improvements of Filipino migrants in Sabah. Both leaders have reach an agreement to establish a school, hospital and a consulate in Sabah to make an easy contact with the Philippine central government for any problems facing by the Filipino community in the state, while deporting "problematic and undocumented Filipino refugees and immigrants" that has long been a thorn in bilateral ties for both countries.

=== Claim over Spratly Islands ===
Malaysia and the Philippines both claim a portion of the disputed Spratly Islands, some or all of which are also claimed by Vietnam, the People's Republic of China, and the Republic of China. The Philippines have had a claim on the islands, officially since independence in 1946, though they have only actively pursued the claims since 1956. In 1979, they said they only wanted seven of the islands that were under their control. Malaysia has staked a claim since 1976, claiming the southern islands which is nearest to them as part of their country under the Law of the Sea regarding continental shelf. But unlike the Philippines and Vietnam, which have internationalised the dispute due to Chinese aggression, Malaysia has taken a weaker stance, as the country receives large infrastructure investments from China and cannot press its claims more aggressively.

=== Sabah attacks and Mindanao conflict ===
It is believed that the Philippine government under Ferdinand Marcos were once planning an attack to "destabilise" Sabah through an operation known as the "Operation Merdeka". As a consequence, the Malaysian government were once supporting the insurgency in Mindanao, although recently Malaysia has assisted in the peacekeeping efforts. The threats were continued until today when some Filipino politicians seems supporting militants raids over Malaysia, which threatening ties between the two countries. Due to the frequent threats and attacks, the Royal Malaysia Police and the Malaysian Deputy Prime Minister has made a proposal to ban barter trade between Malaysia and the Philippines as it was seen only benefited to one side and threatening the security of the state. This was enforced then although facing numerous opposition from the Malaysian opposition parties and Filipino resident on the nearest Philippine islands due to the raise of the living cost in their region after the ban, while receiving positive welcomes by Sabahans residents and politicians. The barter trade activity was resumed on 1 February 2017 with the increase of security surveillance and enforcement from both Malaysia and the Philippines authorities to jointly secure their borders. Despite the return of barter trade activity, the state of Sabah has maintained they will always be cautious on their trade with the Philippines.

== See also ==
- Malaysia–Philippines border
- Filipinos in Malaysia
- Filipinos of Malay descent
