= Yazmin Aziz =

Filipino-Malaysian singer-songwriter

Yazmin
- Born: Yazmin Aziz; 10 September 2001 (age 25); Kuala Lumpur, Malaysia
- Genres: Pop, R&B, soul, Lofi
- Occupations: Singer-Songwriter, Content creator
- Years active: 2017–present

Yazmin Aziz (born 10 September 2001) is a Malaysian-Filipino Singer, Songwriter and Content creator.

== Education ==
Yazmin studied Musical. While a student she was working part-time in a theater production. She speaks English, Tagalog, and Bahasa Malaysia. She completed her Diploma in May, 2021 and is currently studying Bachelor of Communication (Media Studies) (Hons) at HELP University.

She provided vocal performance at the 2020 Virtual World Championship of Performing Arts, and is a Silver and Industry Awardee in vocal performance at the 2017 World Championship of Performing Arts in Long Beach, California, the 2019 Karaoke World Championship in Tokyo, Global Pinoy Idol, and Hurr.tv's Bakat Ohsem Malaysia.

== Other Work ==
Yazmin Aziz's first single Lihatlah. She worked with some artist on the lyrics, which she both sings and raps. The song was picked up by Warner Music for distribution.

Yazmin has had performances in Philippines and Malaysia including appearing on ASAP Chillout. singing music she wrote, along with the beatbox performance of Michael Pacquiao and has also charted nationally with her single Cold Rainy Days and Soul Connection on the Hitz Met10. Her other single “Paradise”, a collaboration with Filipino-American artist, Bobby Skyz, also charted on Rakita.

Yazmin also joined Hitz: Homegrown for the month of November 2020.

Yazmin has collaborated with artists JayR and Kris Lawrence, as well as Libyan producer Debani.

Inspired by the pandemic, Yazmin released her latest song, Soul Connection

Yazmin was also a contestant on TV3 (Malaysian TV channel)'s Lagu Cinta Kita Season 2, a reality TV duet competition.

Yazmin’s most recent song releases are produced and composed by Malaysia’s award-winning composer, Sharon Paul. These include “Bosan” and “Crush” which are both featured on TV3’s drama, Cinta Amnesia. Yazmin is also the singer of “Kita Rockstar”, the official theme song for Mobile Legends Professional League 2022.

Yazmin is currently a contestant competing on Astro’s Big Stage Season 4, a reality TV singing competition.

== Works ==
- Pencuri Hati, 2022
- Crush, 2021
- Bosan, 2021
- Ruling Game, 2020
- Cold Rainy Days, 2020
- Heart & Soul, 2020
- Lihatlah, 2018

== Filmography ==
=== Film ===
Year	Title	Role	Notes
2022	Bunga dan Kayu	Pretty	First appearance
