= Putatan =

Putatan Pekan Putatan
- Town and district capital
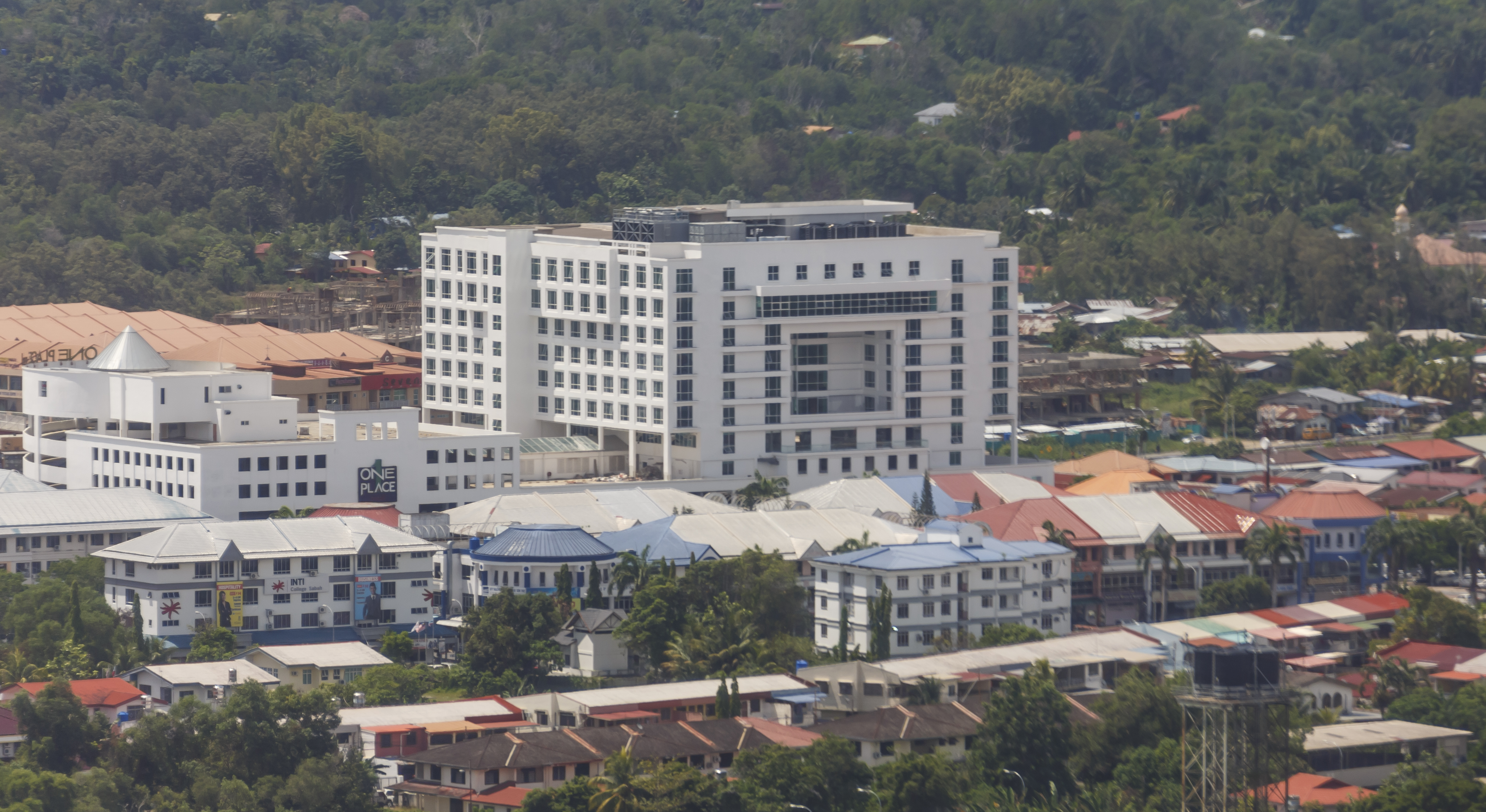
- Putatan Mall (formerly One Place Mall) in Putatan

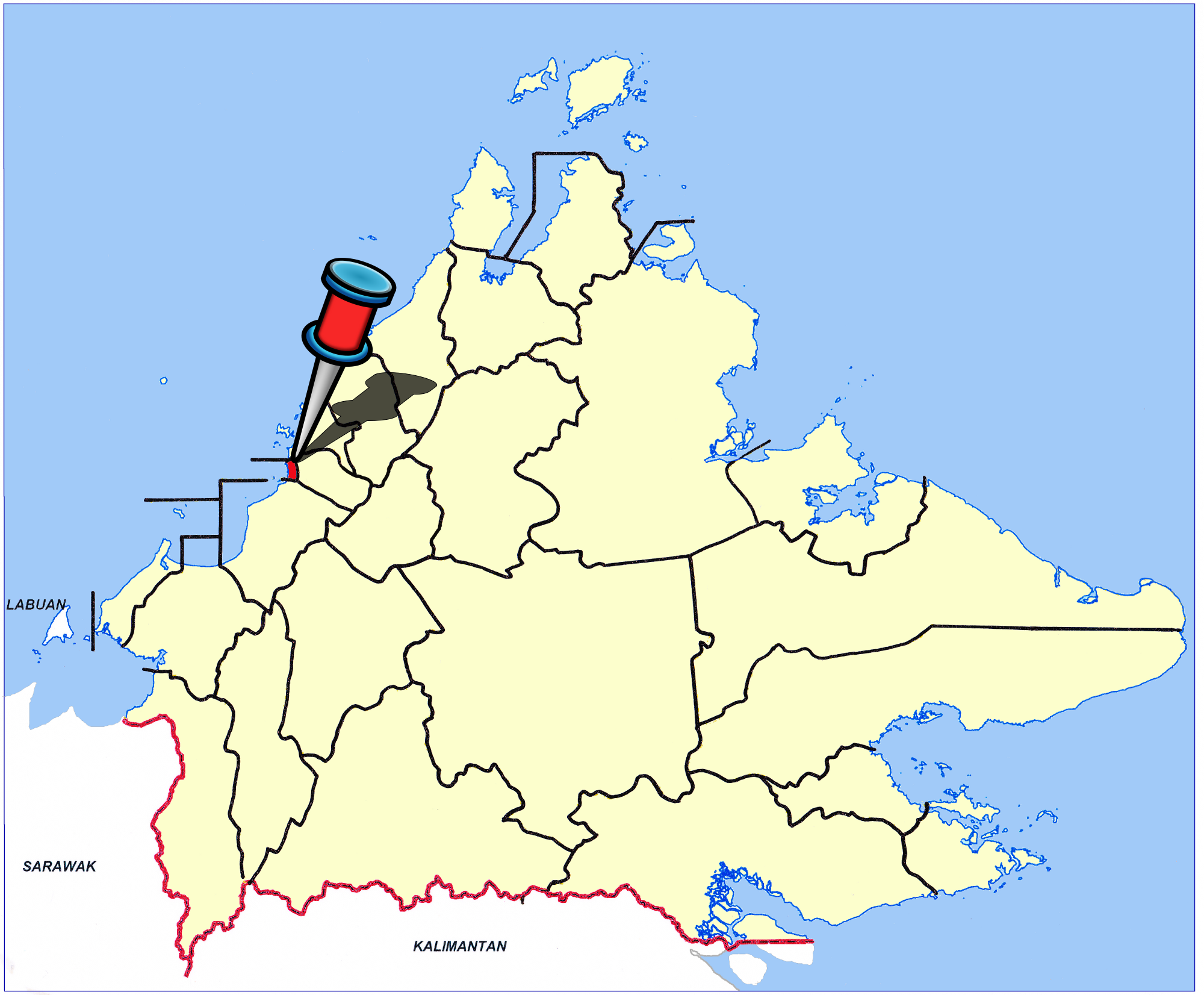
- Coordinates: 5°53′00″N 116°03′00″E
- Country: Malaysia
- State: Sabah
- Division: West Coast
- District: Putatan

Population (2021)
  - Total: 100,000

Putatan (Malay: Pekan Putatan) is a municipality in the capital of the Putatan district in the West Coast Division of Sabah, Malaysia. Its population was estimated to be around 100,000 in 2021. It is one of the satellite town of Kota Kinabalu metropolitan area together with neighbouring Petagas town. Putatan railway station is one of the stops for Sabah State Railway. Previously INTI College Sabah Campus had its main campus for Sabah in Putatan town, but this has now moved to Tuaran.
