= Arthur West =

Arthur West may refer to:

- Arthur Graeme West (1891–1917), British writer and war poet
- Arthur Joseph West (1863–1937), British railway engineer
