= Kawang Revolt =

1904 rebellion in North Borneo

Date	1904
Location	Kawang, North Borneo
Result	North Borneo Company victory

Belligerents
North Borneo Chartered Company; (North Borneo) Tegahas tribe	Kadazan rebels

Commanders and leaders
(North Borneo) Romantai	Bantah

Units involved
British North Borneo Constabulary	

The Kawang Revolt was an armed uprising in Kawang against the North Borneo Chartered Company. This uprising was led by Bantah, a notorious Kadazan warrior. The chief of the Tegahas tribe, Chief Romantai, joined forces in battle alongside the Company to fight against Bantah.

The Kawang Massacre, also known as the Kawang Raid occurred on March 31 when an armed raiding party of 150 people marched into Kawang and burned the Kawang railway station to the ground, killing between five and twenty people.
