= Melalap railway station =

Railway station in Malaysia

Melalap Railway Station Stesen Keretapi Melalap
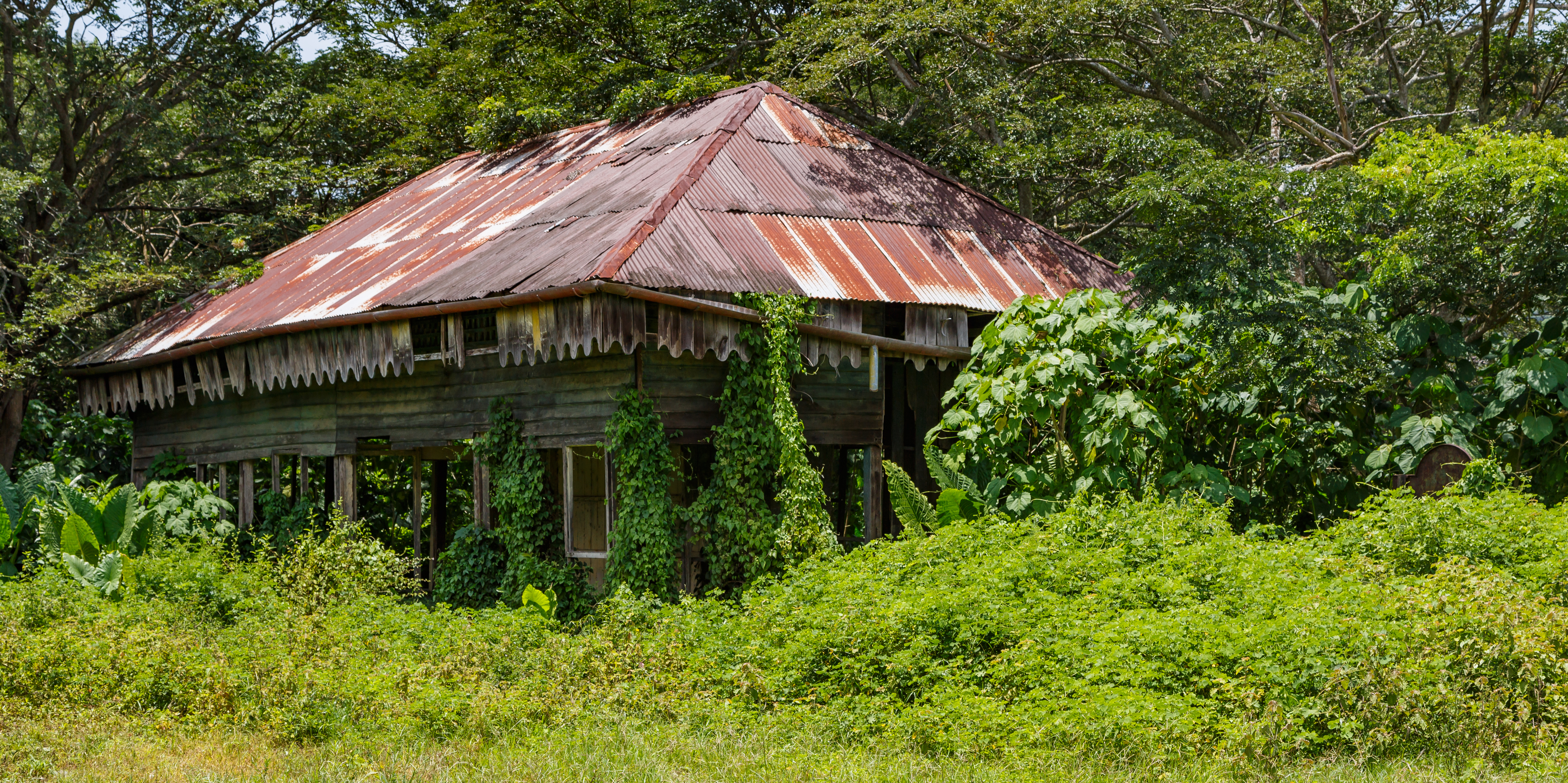
- The station photographed in 2013 before restoration works.

General information
- Location: Melalap, Tenom, Sabah; Malaysia
- Coordinates: 5°14′31″N 115°59′55″E
- Owner: Sabah State Railway (present)
- Operator: North Borneo Railway
- Lines: North Borneo Railway Line (present-day Western Sabah Railway Line)

Construction
- Parking: No
- Cycle facilities: No

Other information
- Status: Collapsed

History
- Opened: 1 August 1914
- Closed: c. 1970 or 1971
Location

Melalap railway station (Malay: Stesen Keretapi Melalap) is a former railway station on the Western Sabah Railway Line located in Melalap, Tenom, Sabah, Malaysia.

== History ==
In 1900s, like most areas in the West Coast Division; vast area of Melalap was once planted with rubber trees. A railway extension line to Melalap was then constructed by English engineer Arthur J. West using labourers from China comprising mostly Hakka people. The line was completed in 1906 to transport the produce of North Borneo as well for people to travel to major towns. The line was opened along with other lines on 1 August 1914. Following the rail service termination due to economic changes in the areas around Melalap, the station was eventually abandoned and fully closed between 1970–1971. The station began to deteriorate and covered with bush since then as nothing been done despite some attempts by certain quarters to save it due to lack in financial funding and support.

=== Preservation and government gazetted as historical sites ===
In 2016, following efforts by volunteer Richard Ker who is the founder of North Borneo Historical Society, the station area have been cleared out and renovated who then launch the #SaveMelalapStation campaign as part of the group efforts to preserve all Sabah historical structures. This was added with the help of funding from bigger companies and other parties who also contribute to the fundraising to save the station. On 9 March 2017, the station was gazetted as part of the historical sites of the modern state of Sabah by the state government. Deputy Chief Minister Joseph Pairin Kitingan said on 20 March 2017 that the old station building would also be preserved as a National Heritage. On 23 February 2018, it is one of 24 heritage sites in the state that were gazetted by Sabah's State Heritage Council under new enactment of "State Heritage Enactment 2017".

=== Collapsed ===
The building suddenly collapsed on 22 April 2018 as no reinforcement work had been undertaken to stabilise the structure despite having been gazetted a month before.
