= Sabah State Railway =

Railway system in Sabah, Malaysia

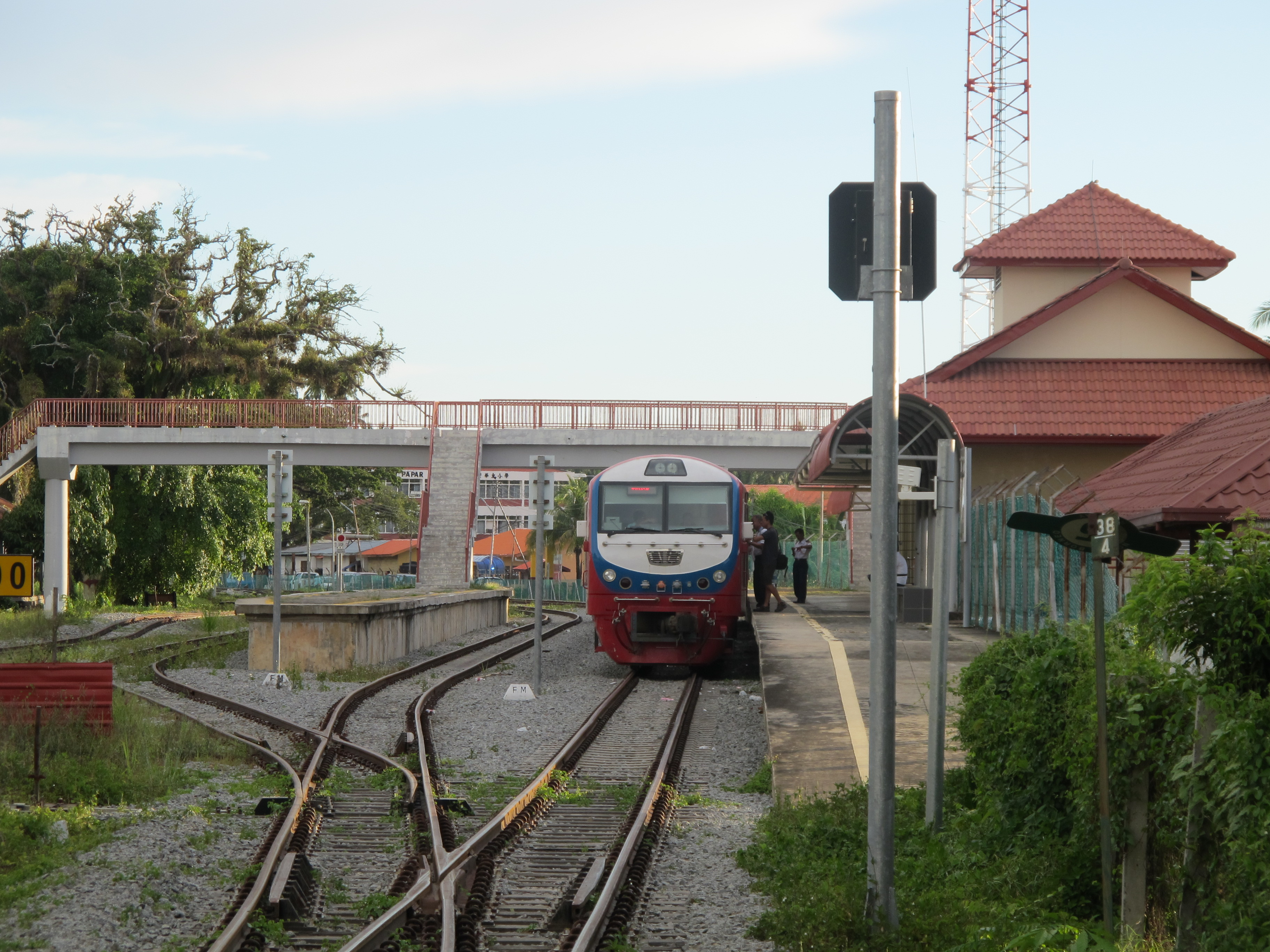

Overview
- Parent company: State Government of Sabah; Ministry of Industrial Development, Trade, Entrepreneurship and Transport
- Key people: Datuk Ir. Ts. Philemon Lajawai (Director)
- Locale: Sabah
- Dates of operation: 1896–present
- Predecessor: North Borneo Railway

Technical
- Track gauge: 1,000 mm (3 ft 3 3/8 in) metre gauge
- Length: 134 km (83 mi)
- No. of tracks: 1
- Operating speed: 90 km/h (56 mph)

Other
- Website: railway.sabah.gov.my
Route map
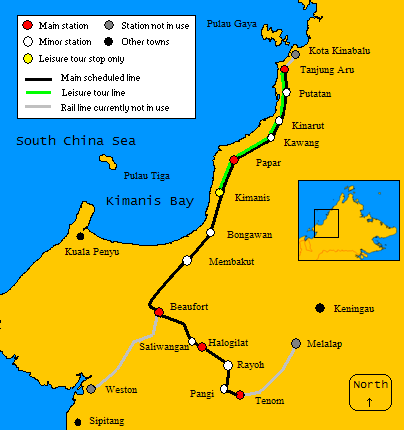
Due to the vast presence of protected level crossing throughout the line, only the most significant crossings were listed.

Sabah State Railway (Malay: Jabatan Keretapi Negeri Sabah) is a railway system and operator in the state of Sabah in Malaysia. It is the only rail transport system operating on the island of Borneo. The railway consists of a single 134-kilometre line from Tanjung Aru, Kota Kinabalu in West Coast Division to the town of Tenom, in the Interior Division. It was formerly known as North Borneo Railway.

== History ==
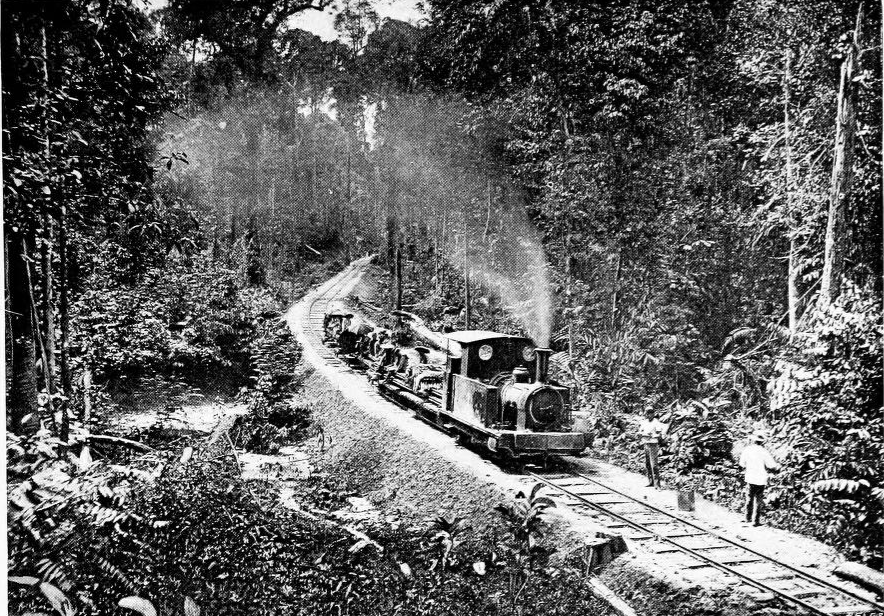
Opening of the North Borneo Railway on 3 February 1898.

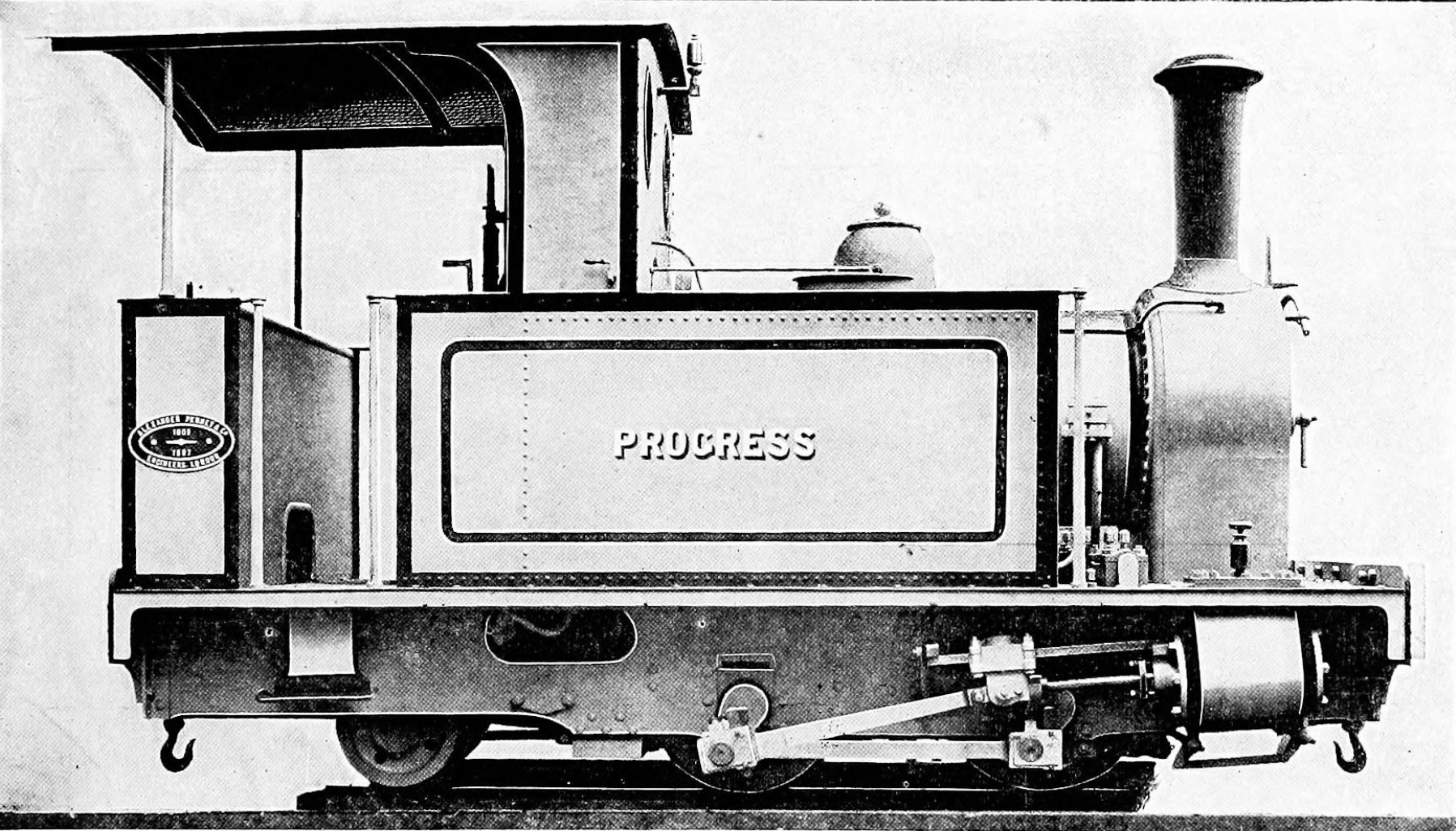
Progress was the first train engine in North Borneo. Built by Alexander Penney & Co. Locomotives in London, it was a 0-4-2T Penney B. Number 1009. It left London and arrived in North Borneo in 1897.

Following the large demands of tobacco prior to the industry success in 1880, there was a great demand for lands for the tobacco plantation. The process to transport the produce was hardened due to lack of transportation. In 1894, following the appointment of a director and managing director for the North Borneo Chartered Company; the involvement of William Clark Cowie become crucial for the establishment of railway systems in North Borneo. Construction of the then North Borneo Railway began in 1896 under the command of engineer Arthur Joseph West with his assistant Gounon Lulus, a member of the Murut people from Keningau.

It was originally intended primarily for the transport of tobacco from the interior to the coast for export. The first line built was a 32 kilometres track from Bukau River, north to Beaufort, and south to the port of Weston. This was then extended with a further 48 kilometres route in 1903 to Tenom, the works for which was completed in 1905. The line was extended again in 1906 with a further 16 kilometres from Tenom to Melalap with workers brought from China. At the same time as this, work began on another line from Beaufort to Jesselton (now known as Kota Kinabalu), which was completed in 1903, running mostly near or beside the coast. With the completion of these works the network routes covered some 193 kilometres.

However, the network was almost entirely destroyed during the Second World War and the Japanese occupation of Sabah. The 24th Australian Infantry Brigade operated the railway in 1945 after securing it from the Japanese. Motive power was mostly converted jeeps. In 1949, the North Borneo Railway embarked on an ambitious programme to rehabilitate the network and improve service, and they did so again in 1960. However, in 1963 the decision was made to close the Weston branch line, and in 1970 the Melalap extension from Tenom was also closed to traffic. The high costs of operation of the lesser used routes and the competition from the many newly built roads made their situation increasingly untenable. In 1974, the main part of the line was also cut from Kota Kinabalu back to Tanjung Aru.

=== Modernisation ===
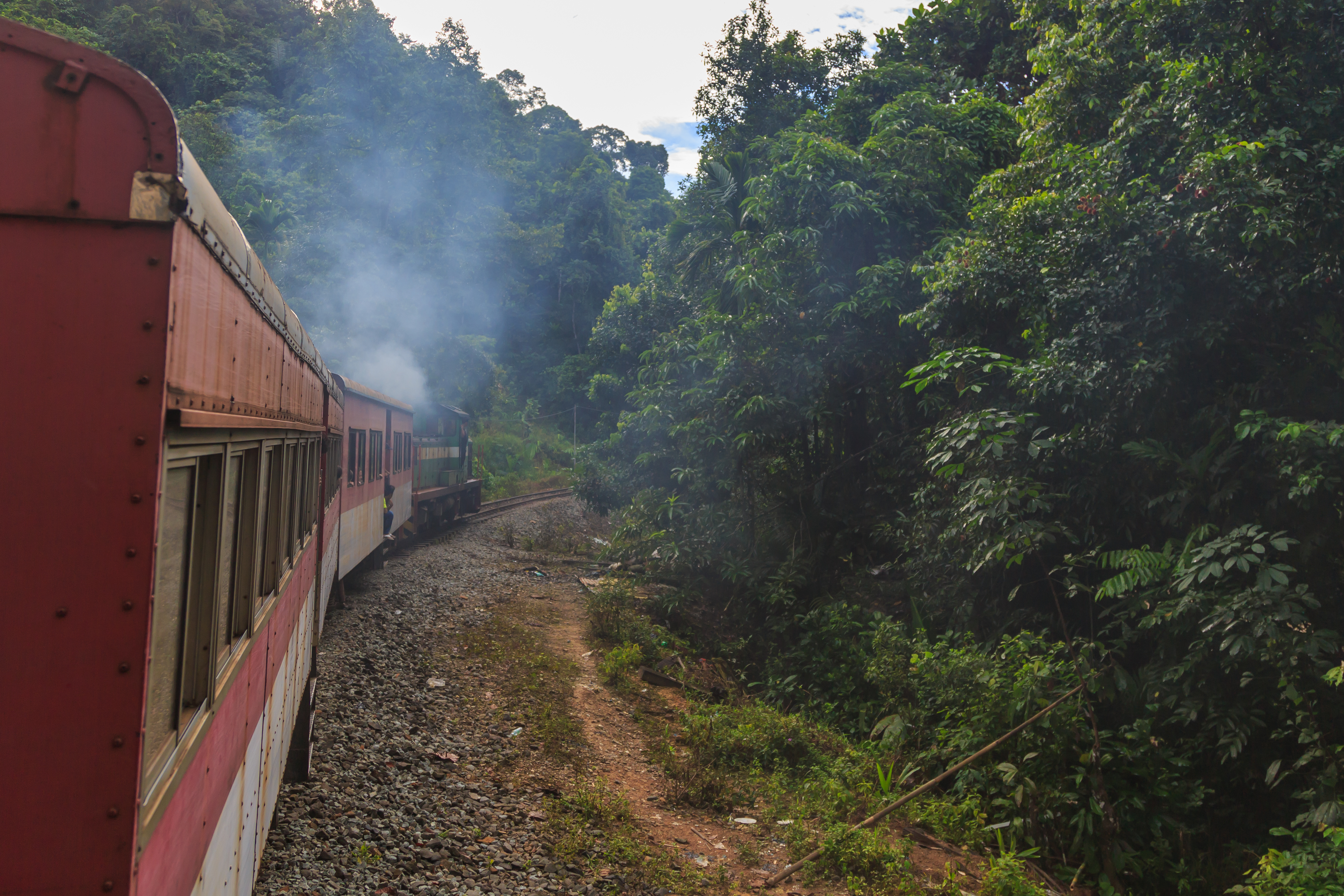
Sabah State Railway train passing through the Padas River Valley in 2014.

The line was closed in 2007 for maintenance and repair. As part of the works undertaken during 2006 and 2007, about 52,530 and 76,600 concrete sleepers were introduced for Sector 2 and 1 of the Tanjung Aru-Tenom section, for better train operation. This replacement mirrors the trend of changing from wooden sleepers as earlier carried out by Keretapi Tanah Melayu Berhad (KTMB) two decades earlier at Kerdau-Jerantut and Sungai Yu-Tumpat lines. These sleepers were manufactured in Peninsular Malaysia by the same local manufacturer.

The section Tanjung Aru-Beaufort reopened on 21 February 2011, and the trip now takes 2 hours and 15 minutes as the coaches can run at a speed of up to 80 kilometres/hour compared to 50 kilometres/hour previously. There are a total of 15 stations between Sembulan and Tenom, namely:

Secretariat – Tanjung Aru – Putatan – Kinarut – Kawang – Papar – Kimanis – Bongawan – Membakut – Beaufort – Saliwangan Baru – Halogilat – Rayoh – Pangi – Tenom

In 2015, a total of RM27.99 million has been allocated by the state government to improve and upgrade the state railway, the provisions include the acquisition of diesel multiple units (DMUs) train set from Japan and a tamping machine for the areas from Beaufort to Tanjung Aru. Additional DMUs from India cost RM8 million purchased in 2016 was delivered in early 2017 for the use in Beaufort to Tenom areas. The state railway have since collaborated with KTMB and the country Human Resource Ministry for staff training and new methods of operations including for the track maintenance. A new headquarters and main station for the railway have also been constructed in Tanjung Aru as part of the Aeropod. On 15 September 2017, around RM101 million allocation by the federal government through Transport Ministry has been approved for three projects to upgrade the railway lines from Halogilat in Beaufort to Tenom with three new DMUs.

Despite some modernisation have been carried out in the past, the train service in Sabah remain in poor condition until 2018 in contrast to modern train service in Peninsular Malaysia. This had been addressed by the State Infrastructure Development Minister Peter Anthony who admitted the train service in Sabah is really far behind compared to its Peninsular counterparts and become an embarrassment to the state with some of the equipment are nearly a hundred years old which should have been sent to the museum, blaming the situation as one of the cause from the failure of the previous state government in administering the locomotive service. The minister stated that the State Ministry under the new government plans to conduct a study to upgrade the state train service to make it in par with its West Malaysia counterparts.

The minister had also urged the Malaysian Anti-Corruption Commission (MACC) to investigate the Railway Department (SRD) for their failure to modernise the state train systems with the new state government promised under their new Key Performance Index (KPI), the railway system and its infrastructure will be developed, including having quality trains with better comfort with the requests for funding from the federal government will be forwarded to connecting Melalap, Beaufort and expanding the rail network to Tuaran, Kudat, Pitas until Tawau in the eastern coast of Sabah.

==== Leisure and tourism service ====
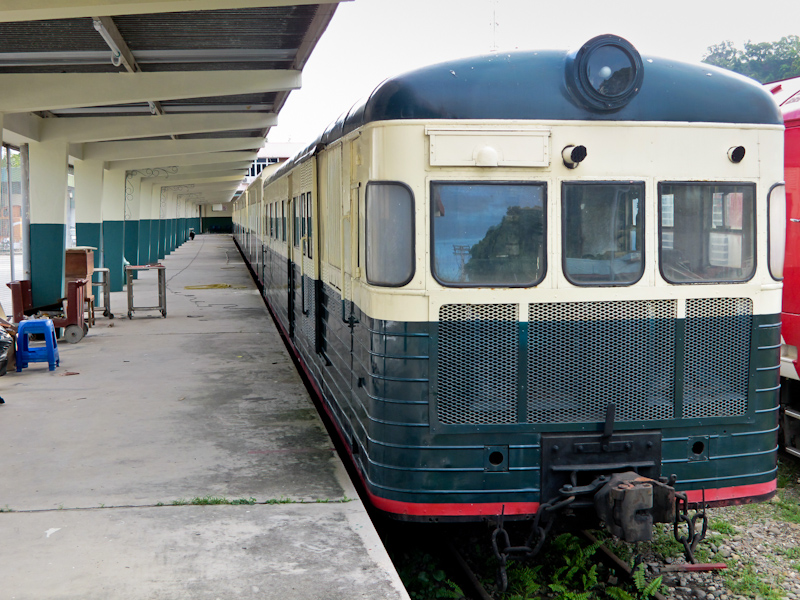
The North Borneo Railway Tour Line train.

A train for tourism called North Borneo Railway was also established from Kota Kinabalu to Papar passing through Putatan, Kinarut and Kawang. The train is operated by the Kinabalu Heritage Tours & Car Rental Sdn Bhd management.

=== Line extension plan ===
On 17 September 2015, it was announced that the railway line in Sabah will be extended to cover the northern and east coast areas, mainly to major towns of Kudat, Sandakan and Tawau. On 21 March 2017, around RM1 million has been allocated for the project study.

Once the project is complete, there is also a proposal to connecting the rail networks of Sabah and Sarawak in Malaysia with the provinces of Kalimantan in Indonesia that will be called as "Trans-Borneo Railway", as Indonesia were currently developing the railway network on their side. On 25 November 2017, the Sabah State Legislative Assembly approved the Railways Enactment 2017 as a replacement of the 103-year-old Railways Ordinance that had been enforced since 1914, giving a passage to extend the railway line coverage to the whole state including for the implementation of Trans-Borneo Railway which will be enforced from 2 January 2017.

Following the change of government, Sabah Chief Minister Shafie Apdal has assured that the railway service will be upgraded and expanded to Kudat in two to three years from 2018 after financial stability with the railway tracks and its coaches will be changed with the railway system to become as the second main land transportation network after Pan Borneo Highway. As a response to an opposition assemblyman question on 6 August 2019 regarding line extension plan including the development of rural infrastructure, State Infrastructure Development Minister Peter Anthony explained that RM2 million has been set aside for a 12-month feasibility study for the Kudat railway project, which takes off in 2020. He added that it has been time that Sabah should have a proper public transportation system, comparing the transportation in Malaysia's capital of Kuala Lumpur which have an extensive system unlike in Sabah that has been left too much under the previous administration.

== Administrative aspects ==
The railway is now operated by Sabah State Railway Department, which is an arm of the Sabah state administration. Current rehabilitation work on the railway is however being handled jointly by SSR along with KTMB, the corporatised (but wholly federal government owned) railway operator for the railway network in Peninsular Malaysia. Despite this, SSR is still operationally and administratively completely separate from KTMB, and uses different operational equipment.

=== General Managers ===
Period	General Managers or Directors
1896–1902	no records
1902–1903	T. R. Hubback
1903–1904	A. M. Gavey
1904–1910	A. J. West
1911–1928	J. W. Watson
1928–1931	J. G. Rowan
1931–1934	F. C. S. Philipps
1934–1937	J. Beatty
1937–1940	W. F. Smith
1940–1945	position vacated due to Japanese occupation of British Borneo
1945–1950	Lougi
1950–1957	Harry Jetford
1957–1963	A. F. Lucorotti
1963–1978	Wong Len Hin
1978–1988	Daniel Wong Thien Sung
1989–1994	Mohd. Tahir Jaafar
1994–1997	Hj. H. A. Majin
1998	Ir. Cosmas Abah
1998–2006	Ir. Benny Wang
2006–2008	Ir. James Wong, P. Eng.
2008–2010	Mohd. Arshad Hj. Abd. Razak
2010–2014	Hj. Mohd Zain Hj. Mohd Said
2014–2018	Melvin V. Manjaga
2018–2024	Leonard Stephen Poyong
2024–2026	Ir. Mohammad Safri Abdul Habi

== Characteristics ==
The current operational railway is used for its entire length to carry both passengers and freight. The rail system can be characterised as a regional rail connecting Kota Kinabalu with the town of Beaufort. The route consists of a single track metre gauge non-electrified line. Passenger services are run using two-car DMUs sets from 1970. These have a single-class seating structure and are non-air-conditioned. SSR also has standard passenger cars which can be coupled with freight trains. These too are single-class non-air-conditioned. At present there are three passenger-carrying trains operating daily in each direction running the full length of the route. There is reduced service on Sundays. One of the trains running the full length of the route is a mix of freight and passenger service.

Freight trains are hauled by Hitachi or Kawasaki diesel locomotives, which were introduced in the early 1970s to replace earlier steam units. These units are less powerful than those used by KTMB in Peninsular Malaysia, with the various models being rated between 320 hp and 580 hp. Operating speeds on the line are low, due to the nature of the terrain and the use of relatively low-powered equipment. Passenger services take 4 hours to complete the 134 kilometres journey from Tanjung Aru to Tenom, allowing for stops on the way. Also, the line can be hazardous, with mudslides in rainy weather a real threat that can lead to the service being disrupted or suspended for brief periods.

Recently, the federal government charged KTMB to work alongside SSR to undertake short- and medium-term work on the railway to enhance its safety. This included rehabilitating the track and signalling and also overhauling the rolling stock to ensure continuation of service. As already stated, at present the railway is currently undergoing rehabilitation. This is both a short-term measure to ensure continued operation, and a medium-term one to improve operational safety and to somewhat modernise the system. A possible reinstatement of the Tanjung Aru to Kota Kinabalu part of the route has been considered, although it is not yet known whether or not this will be given approval.

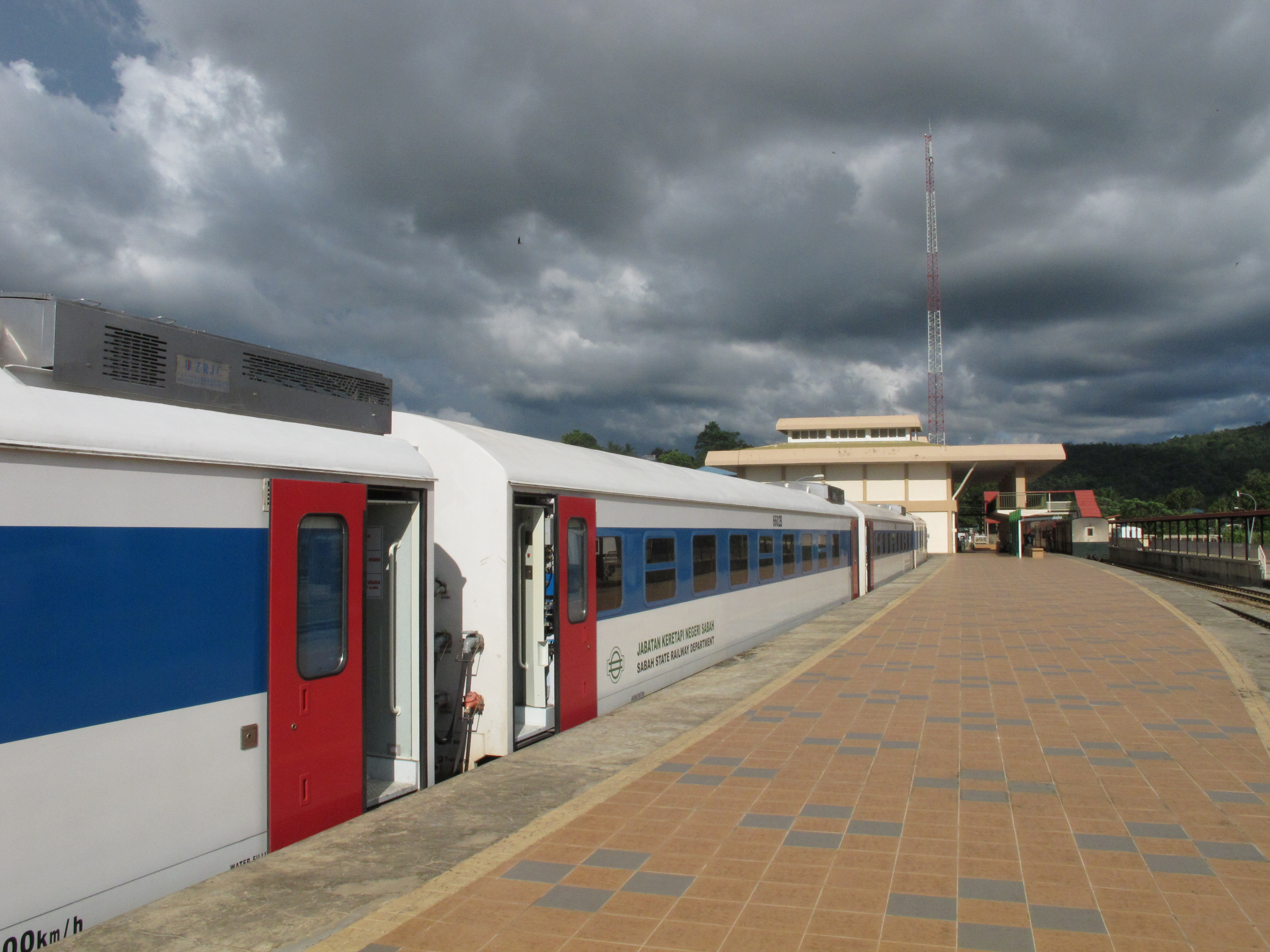
Railway station in Beaufort.

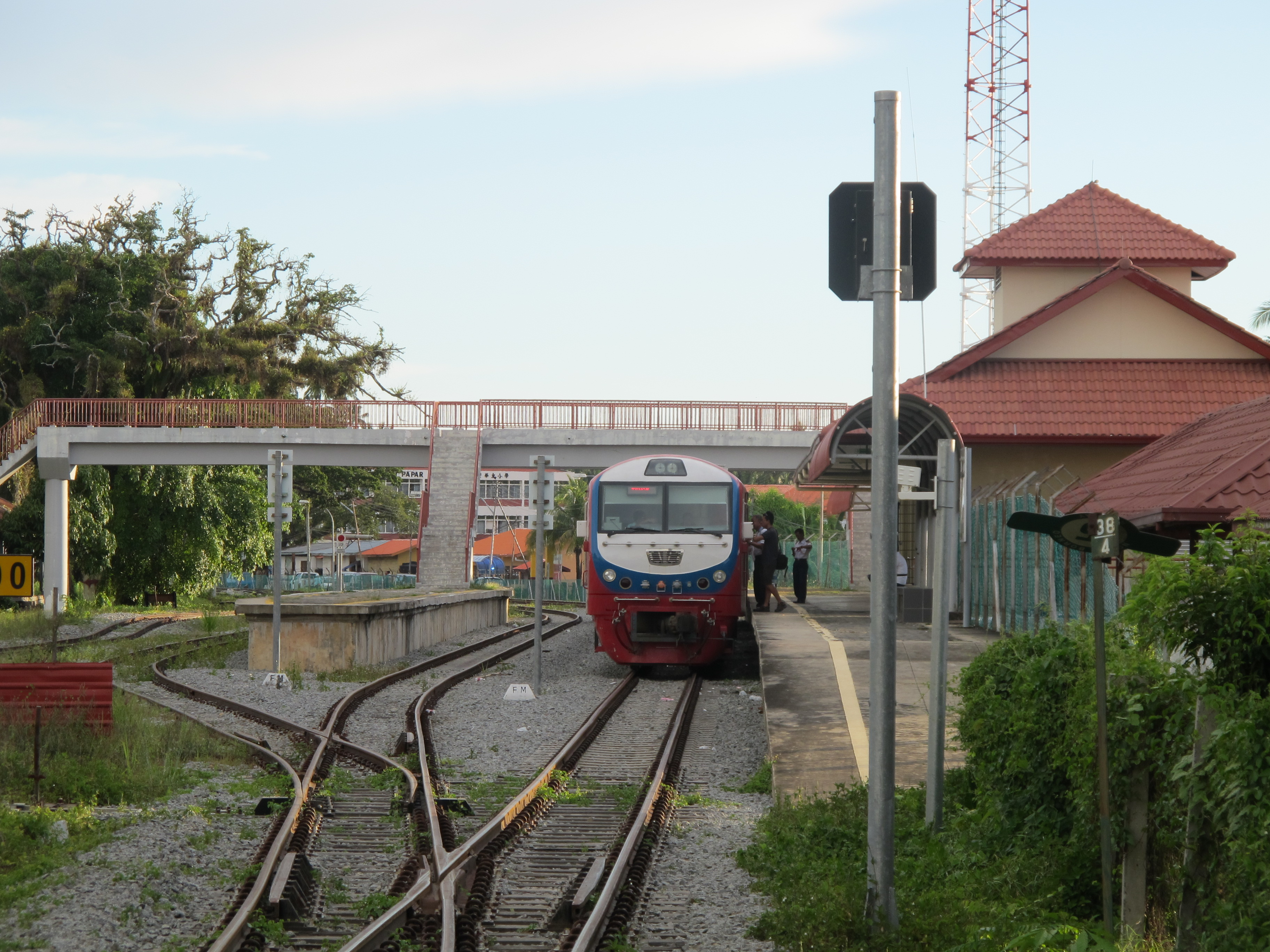
Papar railway station.

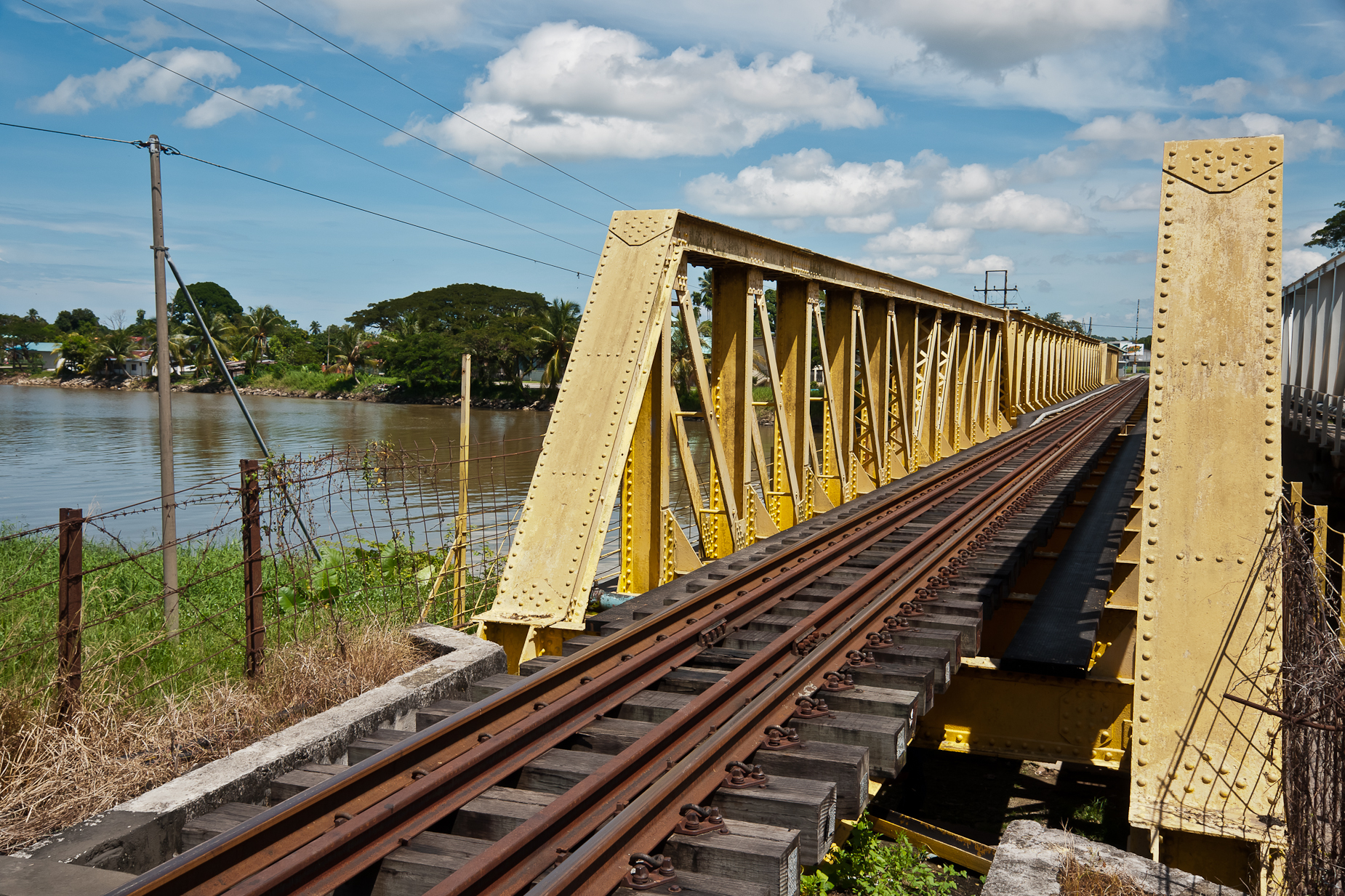
Papar railway bridge.

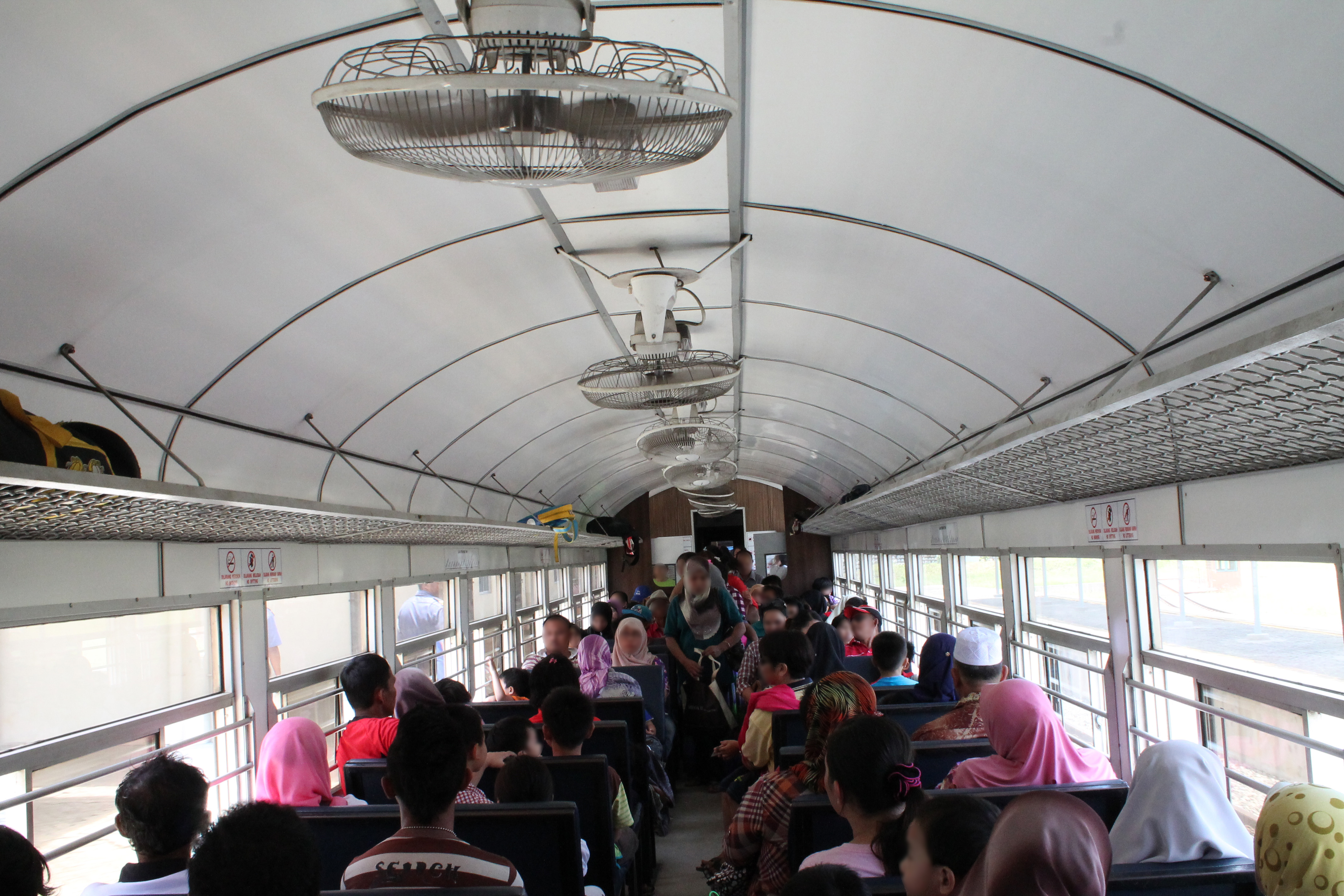
Passenger car interior.

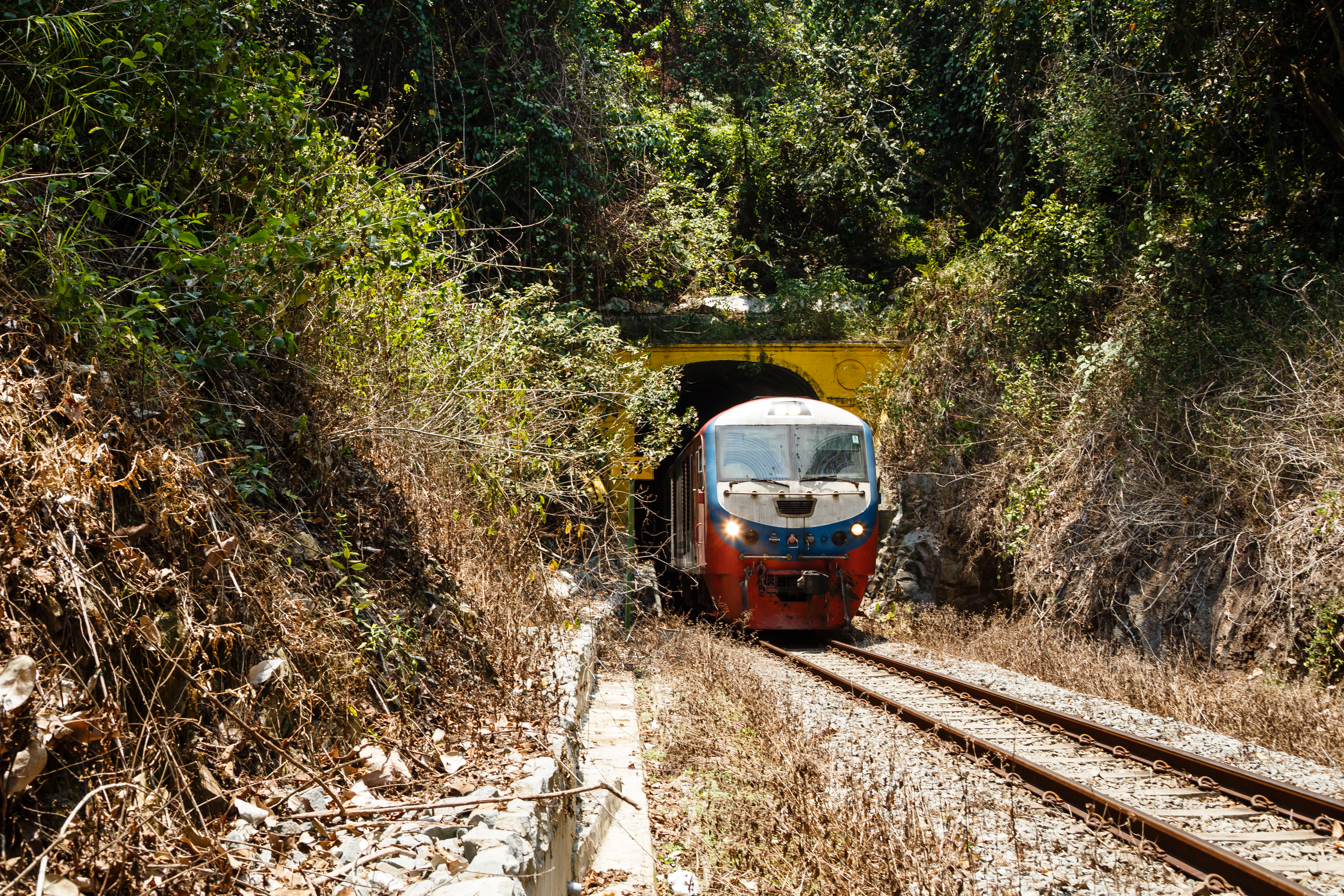
A train passing the Pengalat Railway Tunnel between Kawang and Papar. View from Kawang side.

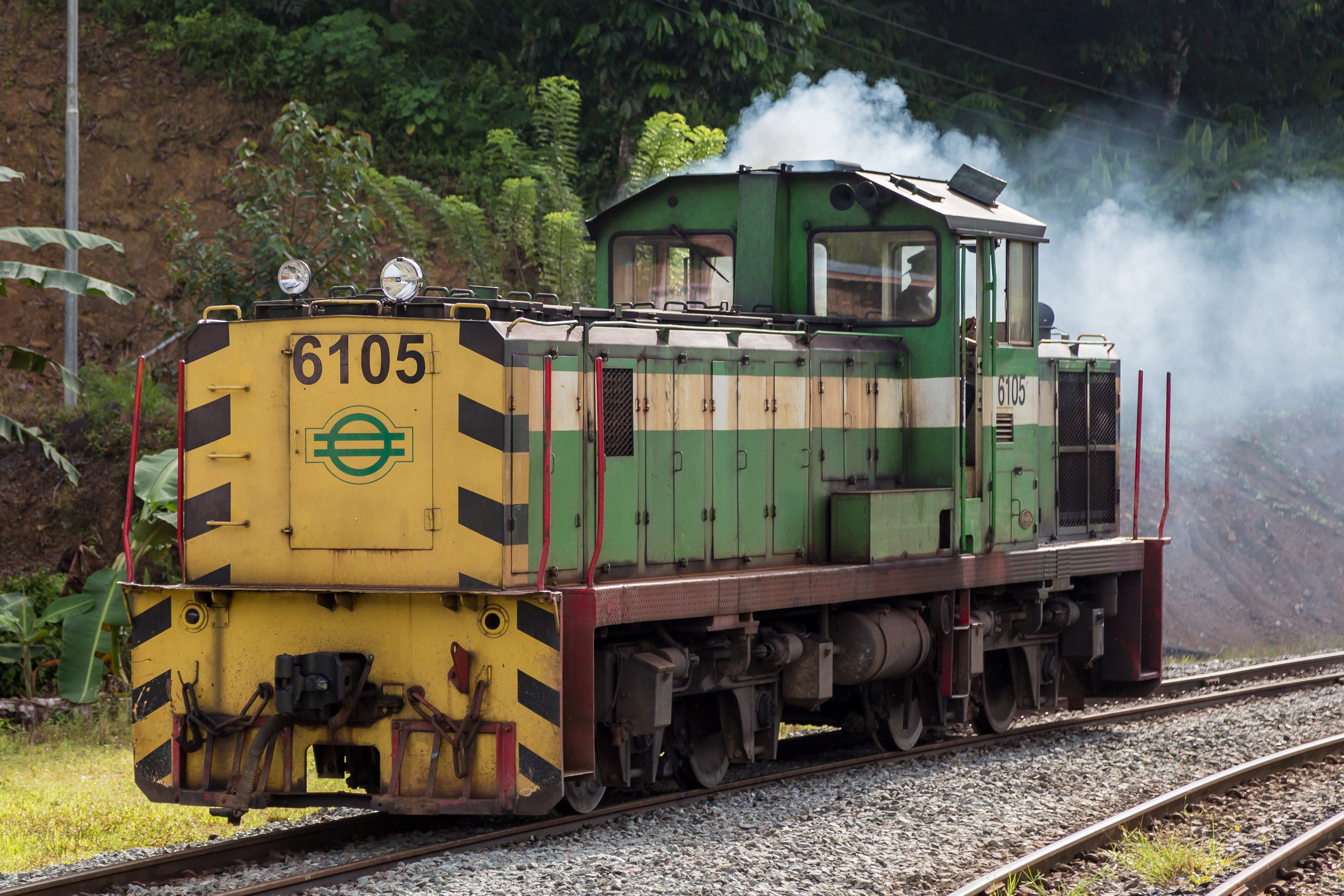
Locomotive U-turning.

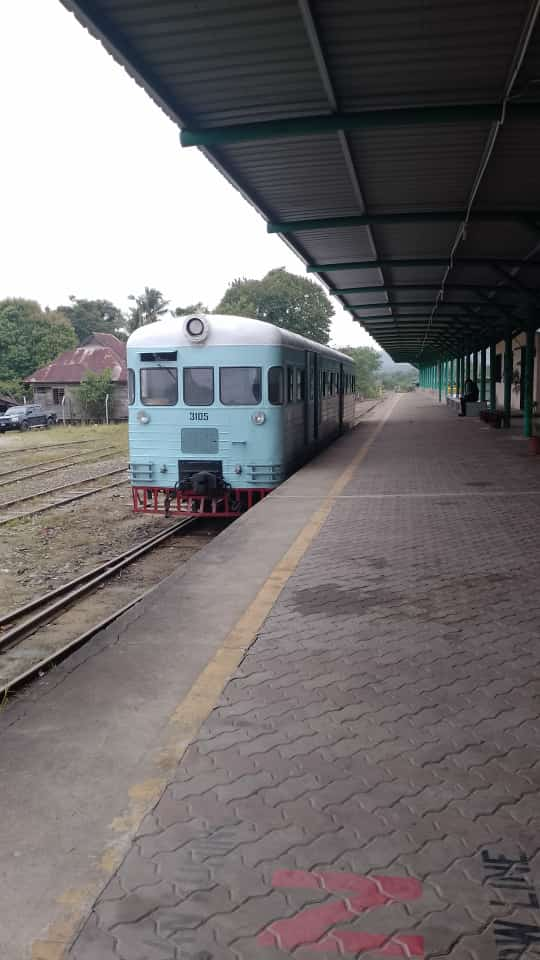
Old Railcar parks at Tenom station.

=== The route ===
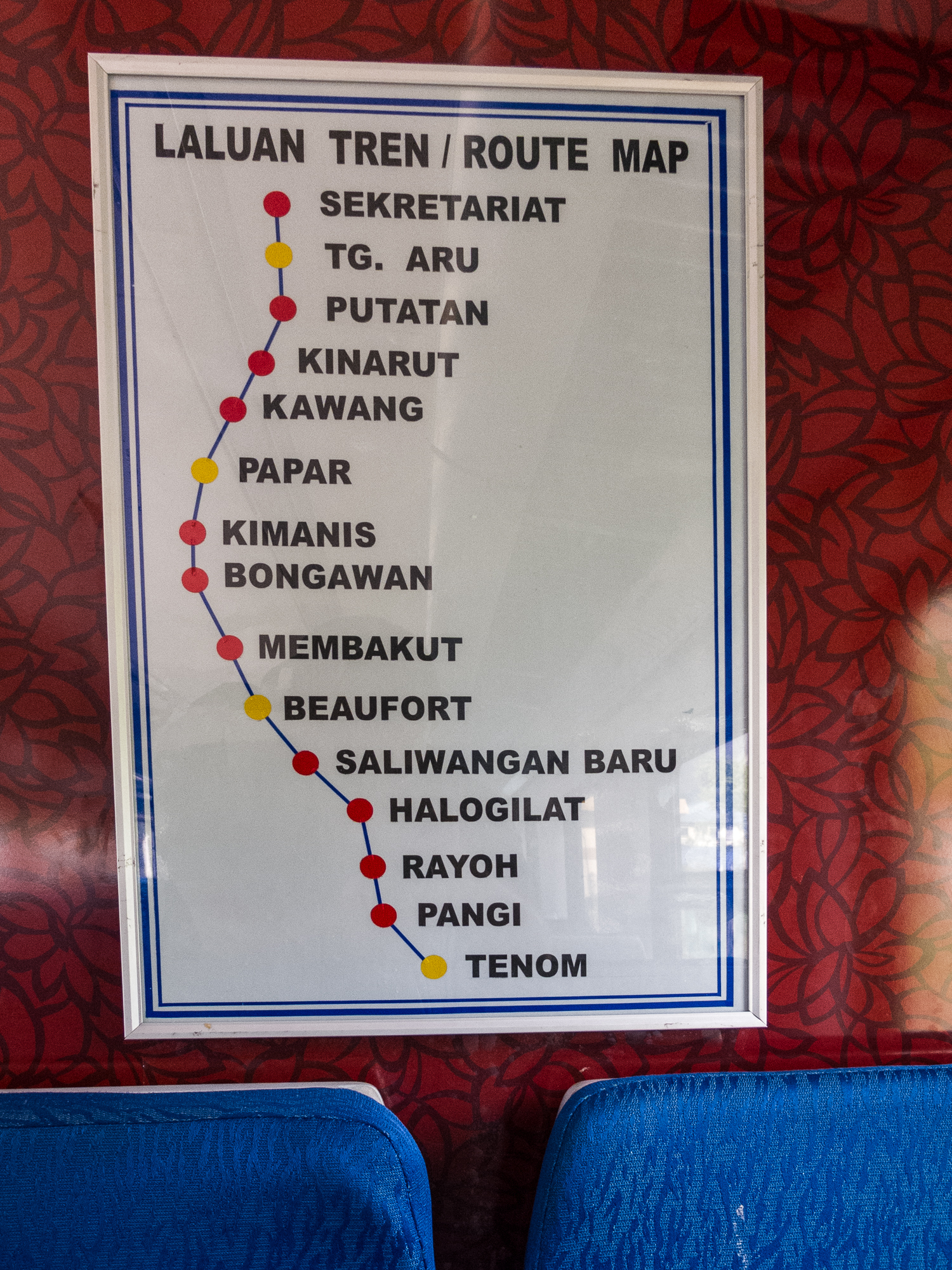
Sabah State Railway route as of 2011.

Main stations are indicated in bold.

- Secretariat
- **Tanjung Aru**
- Putatan
- Kinarut
- Kawang
- **Papar**
- Kimanis
- Bongawan
- Membakut
- **Beaufort**
- Saliwangan Baru
- Halogilat
- Rayoh
- Pangi
- **Tenom**

=== Services ===
As of October 2023, train services provided are as follows:

- 2 trains per day on each direction between Sembulan (Sekretariat) and Beaufort
- 2 trains per day on each direction between Tenom and Beaufort

On weekends, there are 1-2 additional trains operating between Beaufort and Halogilat.

On Wednesdays and Saturdays, a pair of Tamu trains operate in the early morning between Tenom and Rayoh for villagers to bring their produce to the town.

Passengers travelling between Tenom and Beaufort are required to change trains at Halogilat as track conditions between Halogilat and Tenom necessitated the use of lighter locomotives and smaller passenger carriages.

== Accidents ==
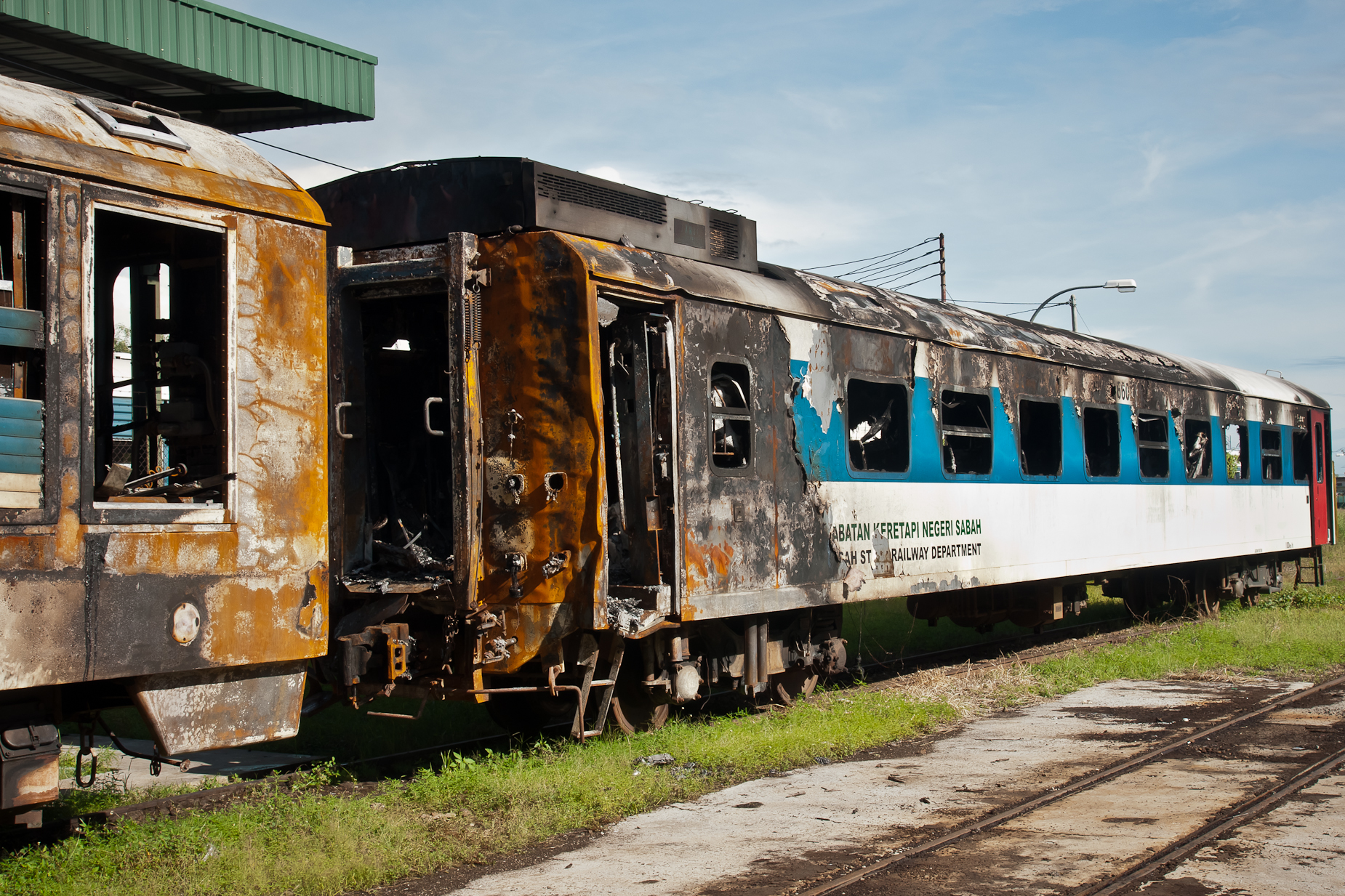
Train burned out after the accident in 2011.

- On 9 April 2008, a Sabah State Railway train plunges 10 metres into Padas River after derailment caused by a landslide near Tenom killing 2 passengers.
- On 31 October 2011, a Sabah State Railway train carrying 200 passengers from Tanjung Aru Station heading towards Papar collided into a fuel tanker allegedly making an illegal railway crossing in Kepayan, Kota Kinabalu. The collision resulted in an explosion resulting in 12 serious injuries but no fatalities.
- On 19 June 2013, three Hong Kong tourists were injured when their car rammed by a train car in Lintas Road in Kota Kinabalu after the car driver did not managed to stop from crossing the rail with a fast train already approaching on their way to Kota Kinabalu International Airport Terminal 1. One of the victim later succumbed to his death due to severe injuries.
- On 16 December 2015, a five-year-old boy was seriously injured and a man slightly hurt in Kg Mandahan, Papar when a train crashed into the Toyota Hilux vehicle they were travelling at a rail crossing.
- On 28 February 2017, three people were killed while four others injured near Kampung Memanjang, Beaufort after a train car crashed into a van attempting to cross the rail while the train having been too close to them.
- On 31 October 2017, a man was killed, one injured while two escaped unhurt after a train rammed their car while crossing the railway track in Kg Mandahan in Papar. Investigations revealed that the route taken by the driver is illegal, and there are no barricades to prevent incoming train.
- On 19 March 2018, a secondary student schoolgirl was killed after falling from train near Beaufort.
- On 26 September 2018, two men were severely injured after their car was hit by a train and dragged for about 20 metres near the Petagas War Memorial area as the gate at the rail crossing was not activated and both victims were apparently unaware of the oncoming train. One of the victim later succumbed to his injuries.
- On 18 April 2019, a man was killed on KM1.5 of the Beaufort-Tanjung Aru line after being hit by incoming train in early dawn.
- On 16 July 2019, two of the rail main coaches was destroyed in a fire in the railway workshop.
- On 8 February 2020, a man with severed limbs believed to be hit by train was found dead on a railway track in Kampung Bekala of Beaufort.
- On 18 November 2024, a woman was killed while her son is severely injured when they were hit by incoming train in front of Kampung Petagas, Putatan District.

== See also ==
- Rail transport in Malaysia
