= Saliwangan railway station =

Railway station in Malaysia

Saliwangan Railway Station Stesen Keretapi Saliwangan
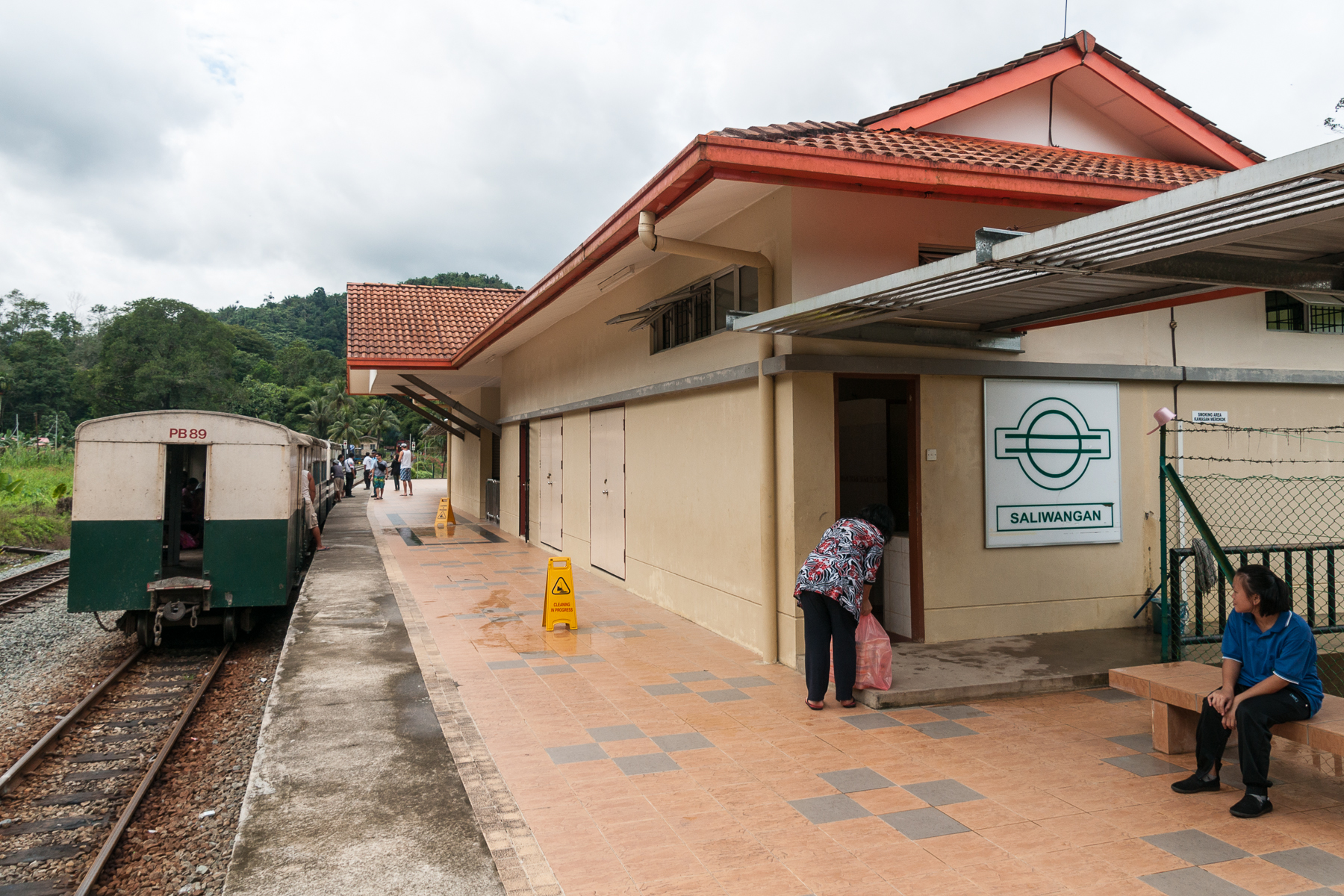
- The station photographed in 2011.

General information
- Location: Saliwangan, Beaufort, Sabah; Malaysia
- Coordinates: 5°17′33.32″N 115°48′6.16″E
- Owner: Sabah State Railway
- Operator: Sabah State Railway
- Lines: Western Sabah Railway Line (formerly North Borneo Railway Line)
- Platforms: Side platform
- Tracks: Main line (2)

Construction
- Platform levels: 1
- Parking: Yes
- Cycle facilities: No

History
- Opened: 1 August 1914
- Closed: 2007
- Rebuilt: 21 February 2011

Services
Preceding station	Sabah State Railway	Following station
Halogilat towards Tenom	Western Line	Beaufort towards Secretariat
Location

Saliwangan railway station (Malay: Stesen Keretapi Saliwangan) is one of eleven minor railway station on the Western Sabah Railway Line located in Saliwangan, Beaufort, Sabah, Malaysia.
