= Putatan railway station =

Railway station in Sabah, Malaysia

Putatan Railway Station Stesen Keretapi Putatan
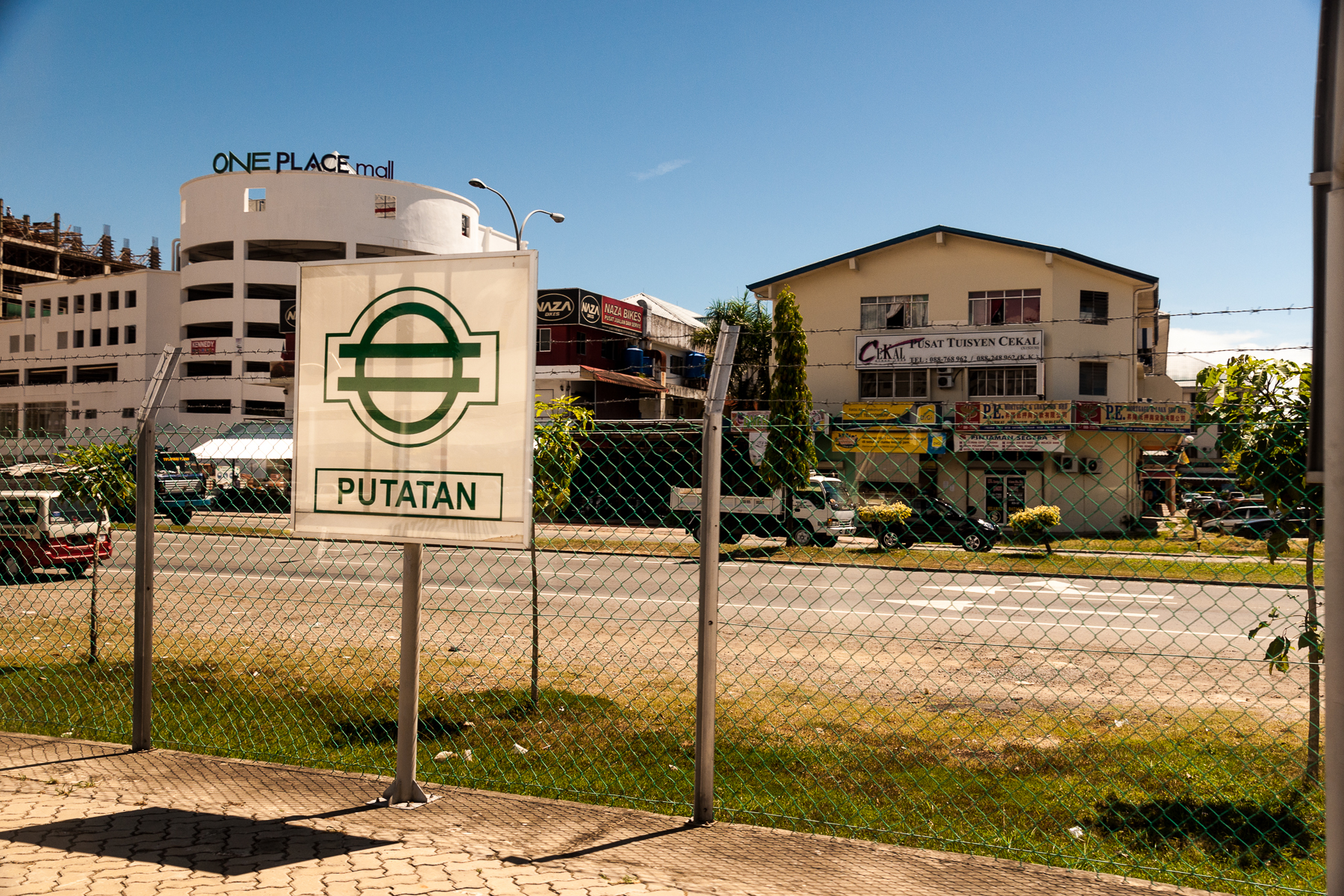
- The station facing towards the main highway photographed in 2011.

General information
- Location: Putatan, Penampang, Sabah, Malaysia
- Coordinates: 5°53′36.77″N 116°2′55.48″E
- Owner: Sabah State Railway
- Operator: Sabah State Railway
- Lines: Western Sabah Railway Line (formerly North Borneo Railway Line)
- Platforms: Side platform
- Tracks: Main line (2)

Construction
- Platform levels: 1
- Parking: Yes
- Cycle facilities: No

History
- Opened: 1 August 1914
- Closed: 2007
- Rebuilt: 21 February 2011

Services
Preceding station	Sabah State Railway	Following station
Kinarut towards Tenom	Western Line	Tanjung Aru towards Secretariat
Location

Putatan railway station (Malay: Stesen Keretapi Putatan) is one of eleven minor railway station on the Western Sabah Railway Line located in Putatan, Penampang, Sabah, Malaysia.
