= Kinarut railway station =

Railway station in Kinarut, Malaysia

Kinarut Railway Station Stesen Keretapi Kinarut
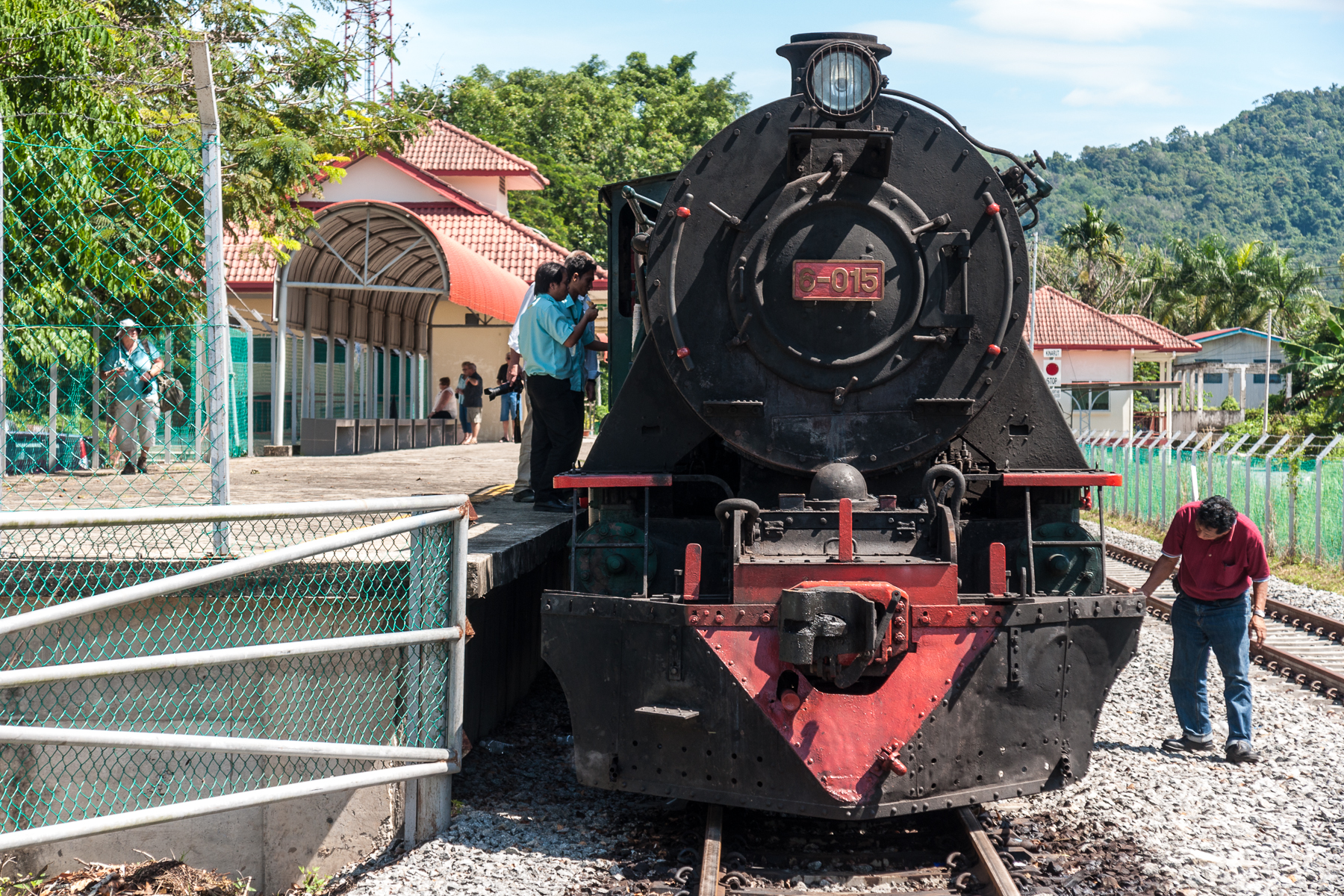
- The station photographed in 2011.

General information
- Location: Kinarut, Papar, Sabah; Malaysia
- Coordinates: 5°49′25.64″N 116°2′37.21″E
- Owner: Sabah State Railway
- Operator: Sabah State Railway
- Lines: Western Sabah Railway Line (formerly North Borneo Railway Line)
- Platforms: Side platform
- Tracks: Main line (2)

Construction
- Platform levels: 1
- Parking: Yes
- Cycle facilities: No

History
- Opened: 1 August 1914
- Closed: 2007
- Rebuilt: 21 February 2011

Services
Preceding station	Sabah State Railway	Following station
Kawang towards Tenom	Western Line	Putatan towards Secretariat
Location

Kinarut railway station (Malay: Stesen Keretapi Kinarut) is one of eleven minor railway station on the Western Sabah Railway Line located in Kinarut, Papar, Sabah, Malaysia.
