= Halogilat railway station =

Railway station in Malaysia

Halogilat Railway Station Stesen Keretapi Halogilat
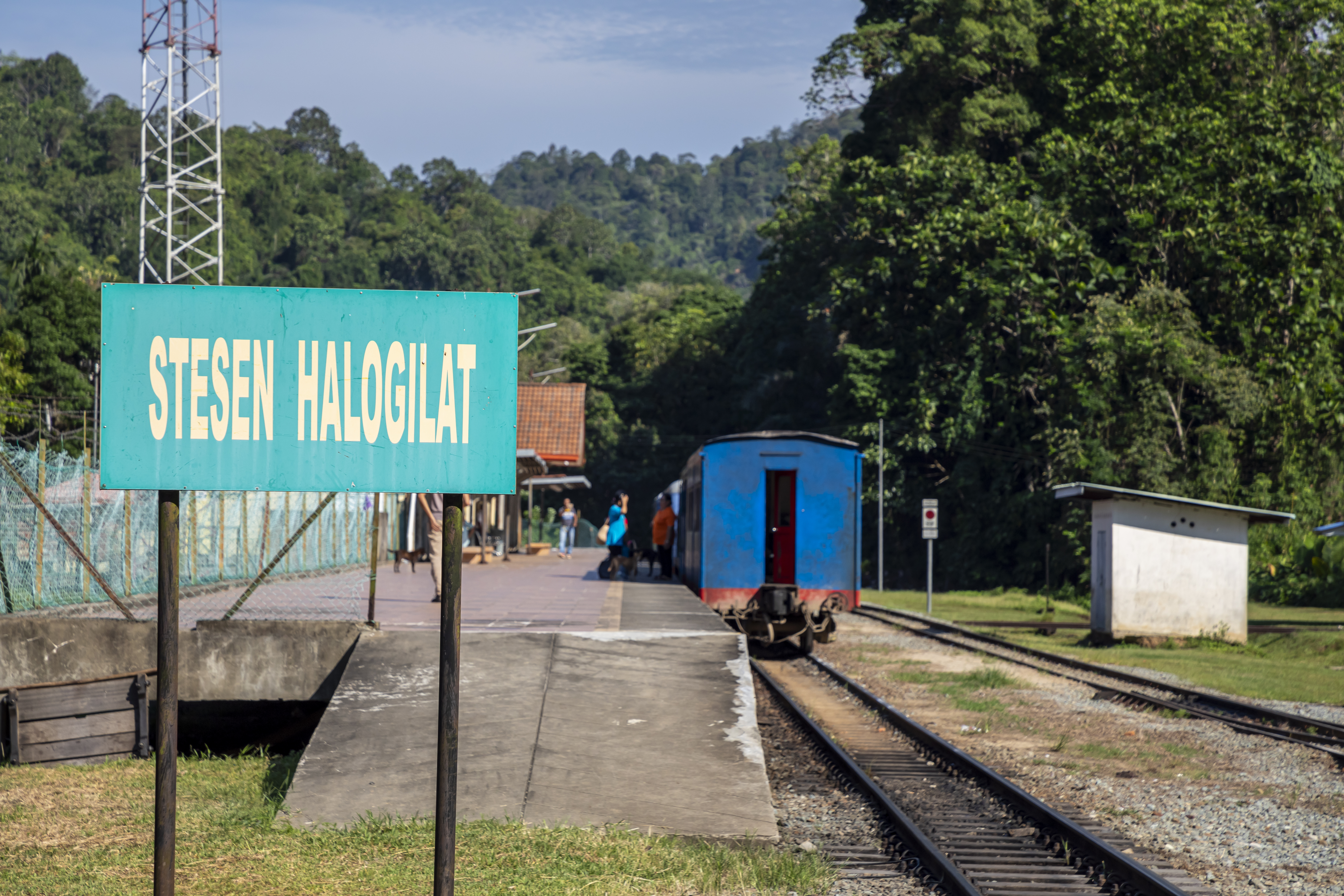

General information
- Location: Halogilat, Beaufort, Sabah; Malaysia
- Coordinates: 5°15′17.92″N 115°49′50.87″E
- Owner: Sabah State Railway
- Operator: Sabah State Railway
- Lines: Western Sabah Railway Line (formerly North Borneo Railway Line)
- Platforms: Side platform
- Tracks: Main line (2)

Construction
- Platform levels: 1
- Parking: Yes
- Cycle facilities: No

History
- Opened: 1 August 1914
- Closed: 2007
- Rebuilt: 21 February 2011

Services
Preceding station	Sabah State Railway	Following station
Rayoh towards Tenom	Western Line	Saliwangan towards Secretariat
Location

Halogilat railway station (Malay: Stesen Keretapi Halogilat) is one of eleven minor railway station on the Western Sabah Railway Line located in Halogilat, Beaufort, Sabah, Malaysia.

== Track upgrade ==
On 19 November 2021, Malaysia's Deputy Transport Minister Henry Sum Agong announced the project to upgrade the Halogilat-Tenom railway track is expected to be ready by early 2022.
