= Tanjung Aru railway station =

Railway station in Tanjung Aru, Malaysia

Tanjung Aru Railway Station Stesen Keretapi Tanjung Aru

General information
- Location: Tanjung Aru, Kota Kinabalu, Sabah; Malaysia
- Coordinates: 5°56′51.3″N 116°3′36.8″E
- Owner: Sabah State Railway
- Operator: Sabah State Railway
- Lines: Western Sabah Railway Line (formerly North Borneo Railway Line)
- Platforms: Side platform
- Tracks: Main line (2)

Construction
- Platform levels: 1
- Parking: Yes
- Cycle facilities: No

History
- Opened: 1 August 1914
- Closed: 2007
- Rebuilt: 30 September 2016

Services
| Preceding station | Sabah State Railway | Following station |
|---|---|---|
| Putatan towards Tenom | Western Line | Secretariat Terminus |
Location

Tanjung Aru railway station (Malay: Stesen Keretapi Tanjung Aru) is one of four main railway station on the Western Sabah Railway Line located in Tanjung Aru, Kota Kinabalu, Sabah, Malaysia.

== History ==
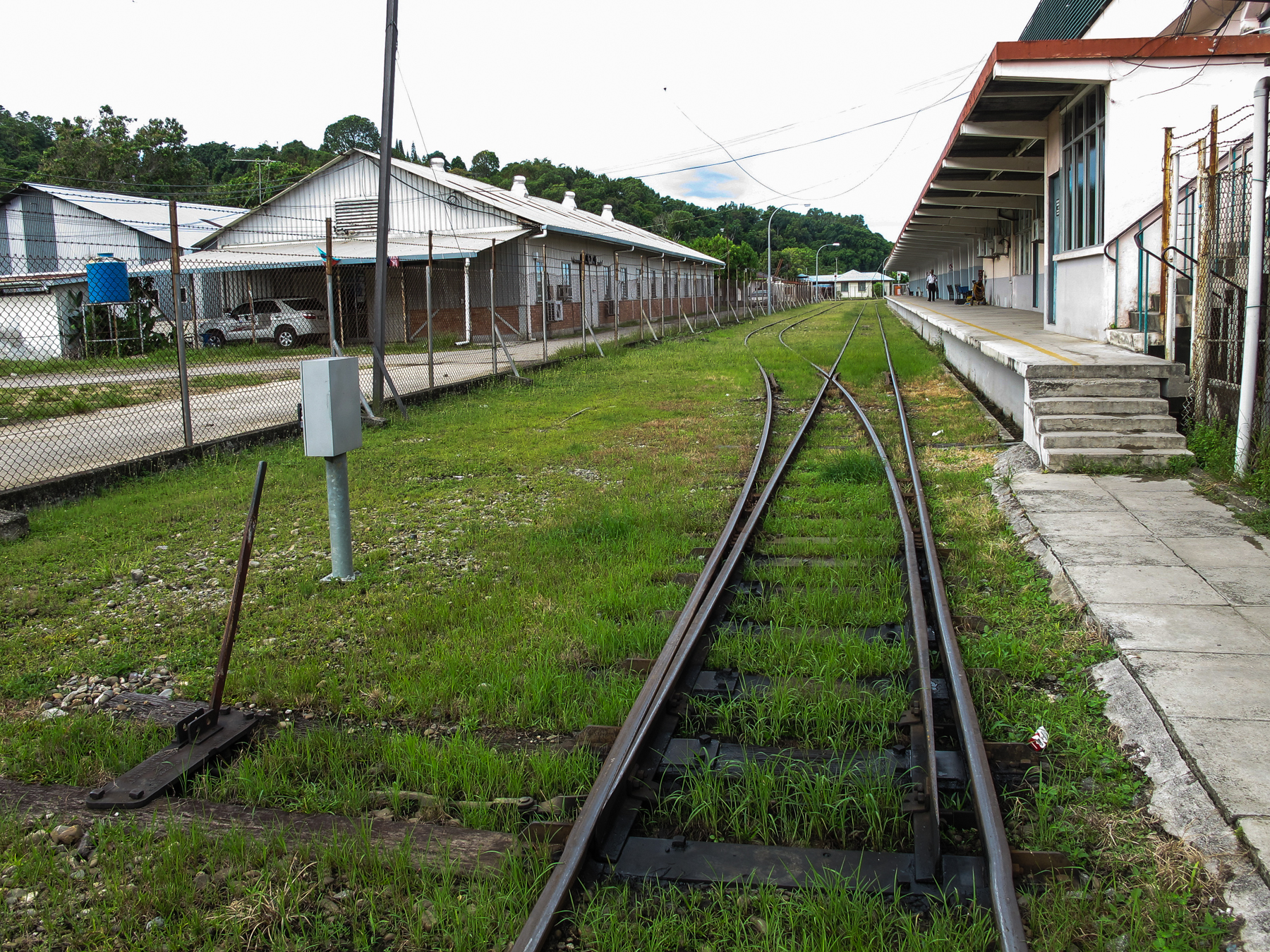
The old station photographed in 2011.

As part of the development of rail networks in North Borneo, construction of rail networks have started since 1896 with the networks from Tanjung Aru passing through the major towns of Kinarut, Papar and Beaufort. Full operation service of the North Borneo Railway was launched on 1 August 1914. In 2007, the station was closed for renovation works with the station building which is originally built from wood are demolished and replaced with a new concrete building. This previous station located at 5°56′47″N 116°3′30″E and began its operation on 21 February 2011.

In 2016, new diesel multiple units (DMUs) from Japan for use in the Tanjung Aru–Beaufort lines was introduced. Previously, there was a main station in Jesselton (present-day Kota Kinabalu) but it was closed in 1974, leaving Tanjung Aru station as the starting point for the rail service in the city. Following the completion of Aeropod, the station was moved into its current location with new building and additional facilities for light rail transit (LRT).
