= Aeropod =

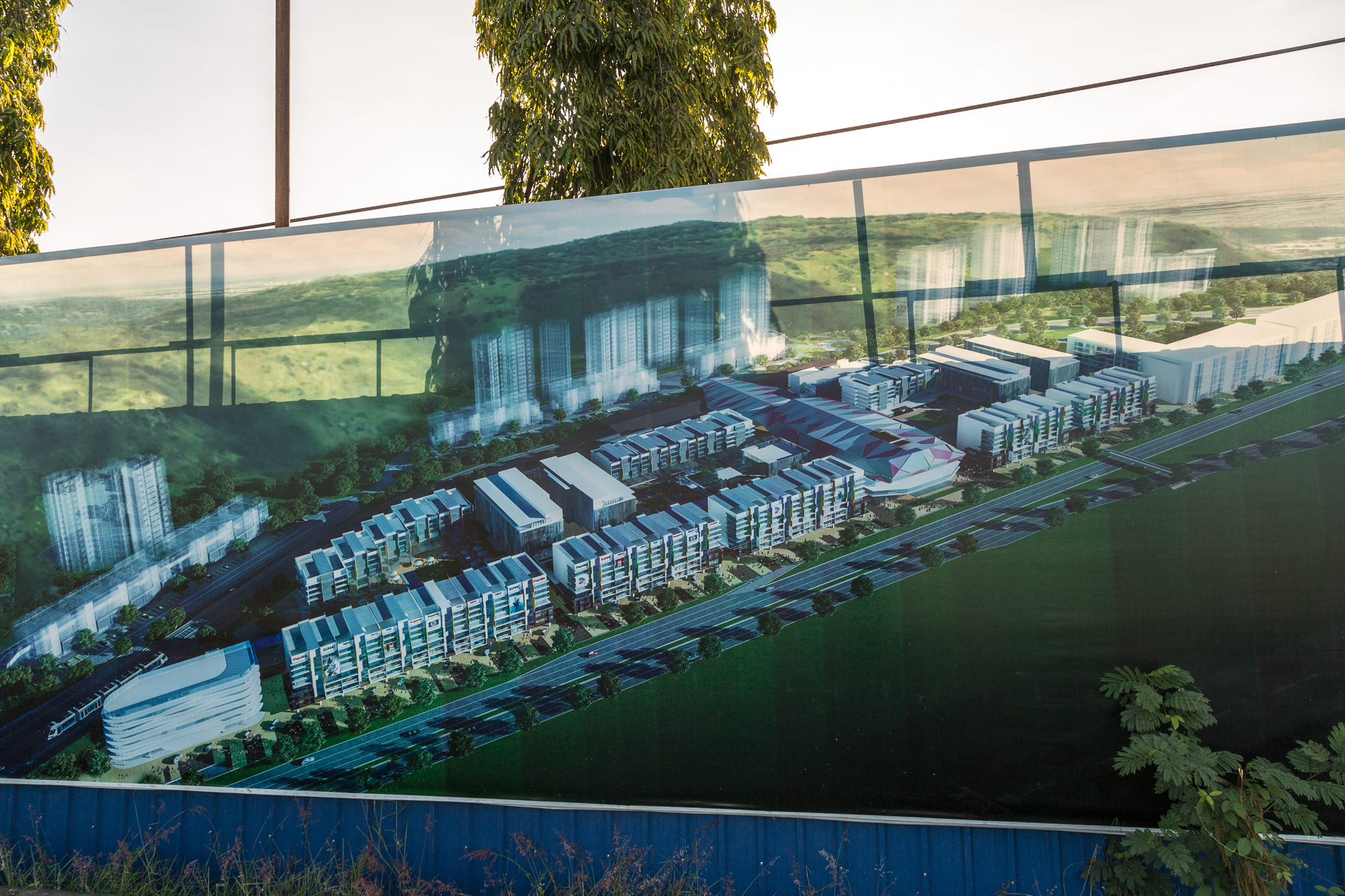
- The project area in 2013.
- Interactive map of the Aeropod area

General information
- Status: Under construction
- Location: Sabah, Tanjung Aru, Kota Kinabalu, Malaysia
- Coordinates: 5°56′50″N 116°3′32″E
- Cost: MYR3 billion
- Owner: S P Setia

Website
- www.aeropod.com.my

The Aeropod is a mixed development projects comprising hotel, a retail mall, retail offices, residential suites, corporate offices and green parks in Tanjung Aru, Kota Kinabalu, Sabah, Malaysia. The projects are being done in five stages. The projects also include a provision for light rail transit (LRT) in the Kota Kinabalu metropolitan, to improve the already available rail station in Tanjung Aru.

== Transportation ==
The Aeropod is situated next to the Tanjung Aru railway station, providing easy access to towns along the Western Sabah Railway Line.
