= Kawang railway station =

Malaysian railway station

Kawang Railway Station Stesen Keretapi Kawang
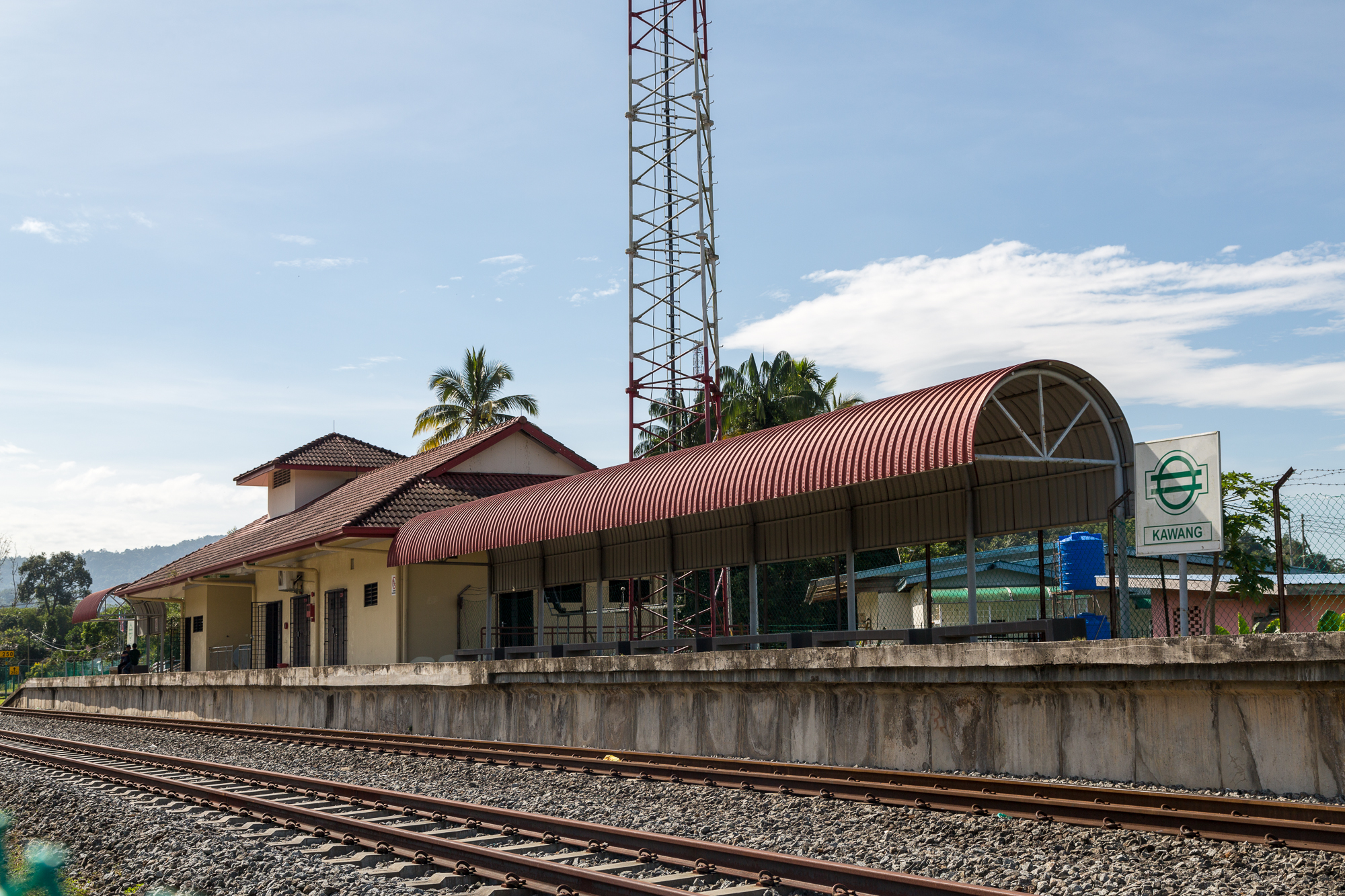
- The station photographed in 2013.

General information
- Location: Kawang, Papar, Sabah; Malaysia
- Coordinates: 5°46′20.84″N 116°1′7.05″E
- Owner: Sabah State Railway
- Operator: Sabah State Railway
- Lines: Western Sabah Railway Line (formerly North Borneo Railway Line)
- Platforms: Side platform
- Tracks: Main line (2)

Construction
- Platform levels: 1
- Parking: Yes
- Cycle facilities: No

History
- Opened: 1 August 1914
- Closed: 2007
- Rebuilt: 21 February 2011

Services
Preceding station	Sabah State Railway	Following station
Papar towards Tenom	Western Line	Kinarut towards Secretariat
Location

Kawang railway station (Malay: Stesen Keretapi Kawang) is one of eleven minor railway station on the Western Sabah Railway Line located in Kawang, Papar, Sabah, Malaysia.
