= Arthur Joseph West =

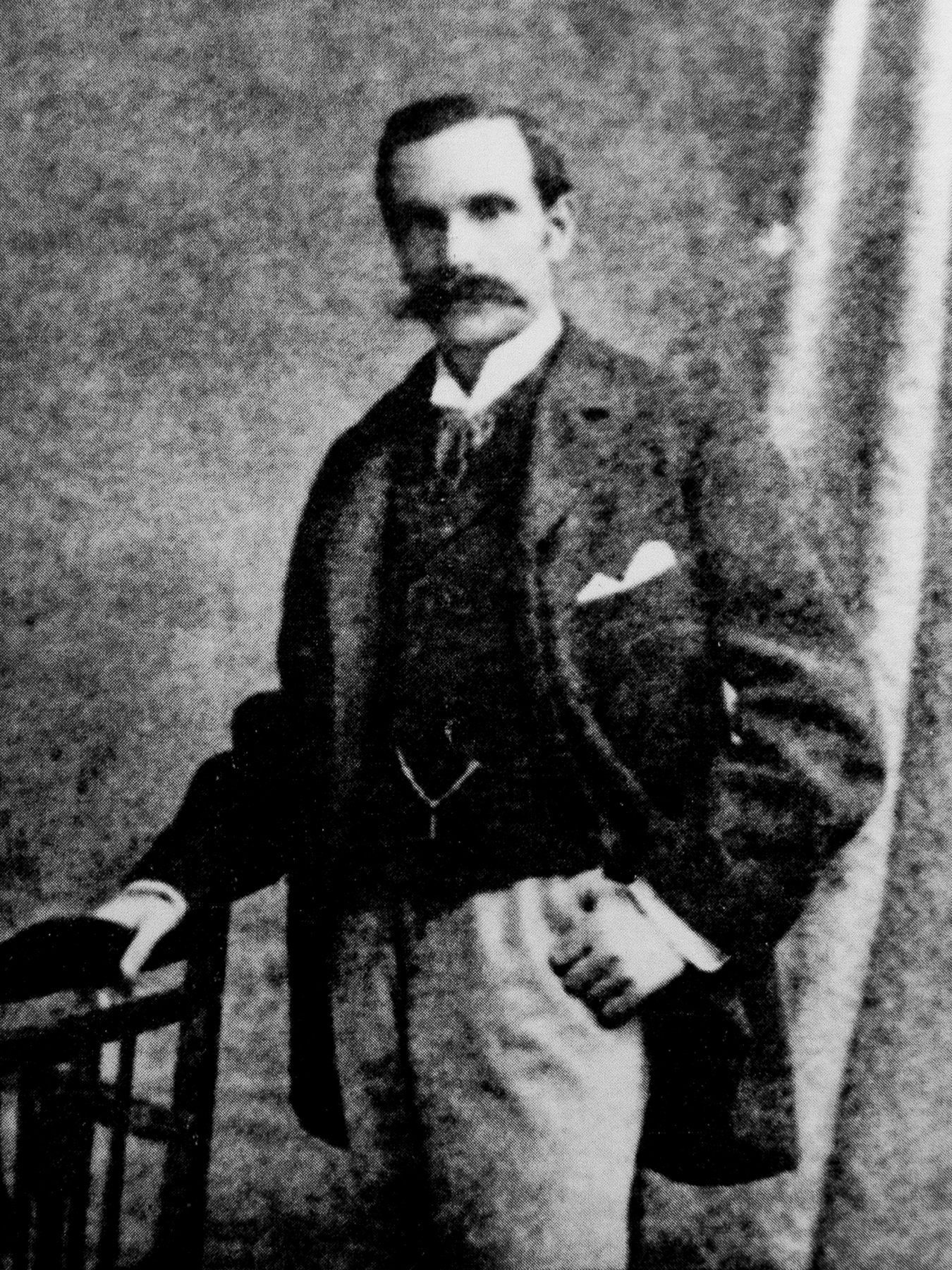

1st Superintendent of Railways for North Borneo
- In office 7 July 1896 – 1910
- Appointed by: Leicester Paul Beaufort
- Preceded by: Position established

1st Chief Railway Engineer for North Borneo
- In office 7 July 1896 – 1910
- Appointed by: William Clark Cowie
- Preceded by: Position established

Personal details
- Born: 1863 Bromsgrove, Worcestershire, England, United Kingdom
- Died: 2 November 1937 (aged 73–74) Bexhill-on-Sea, East Sussex, England, United Kingdom

Arthur Joseph West (1863 in Bromsgrove; – 2 November 1937 in Bexhill-on-Sea) was a British civil engineer. Under his leadership, the Labuan Coal Line and the North Borneo Railway from Beaufort to Weston and Melalap were built.

== Personal life ==
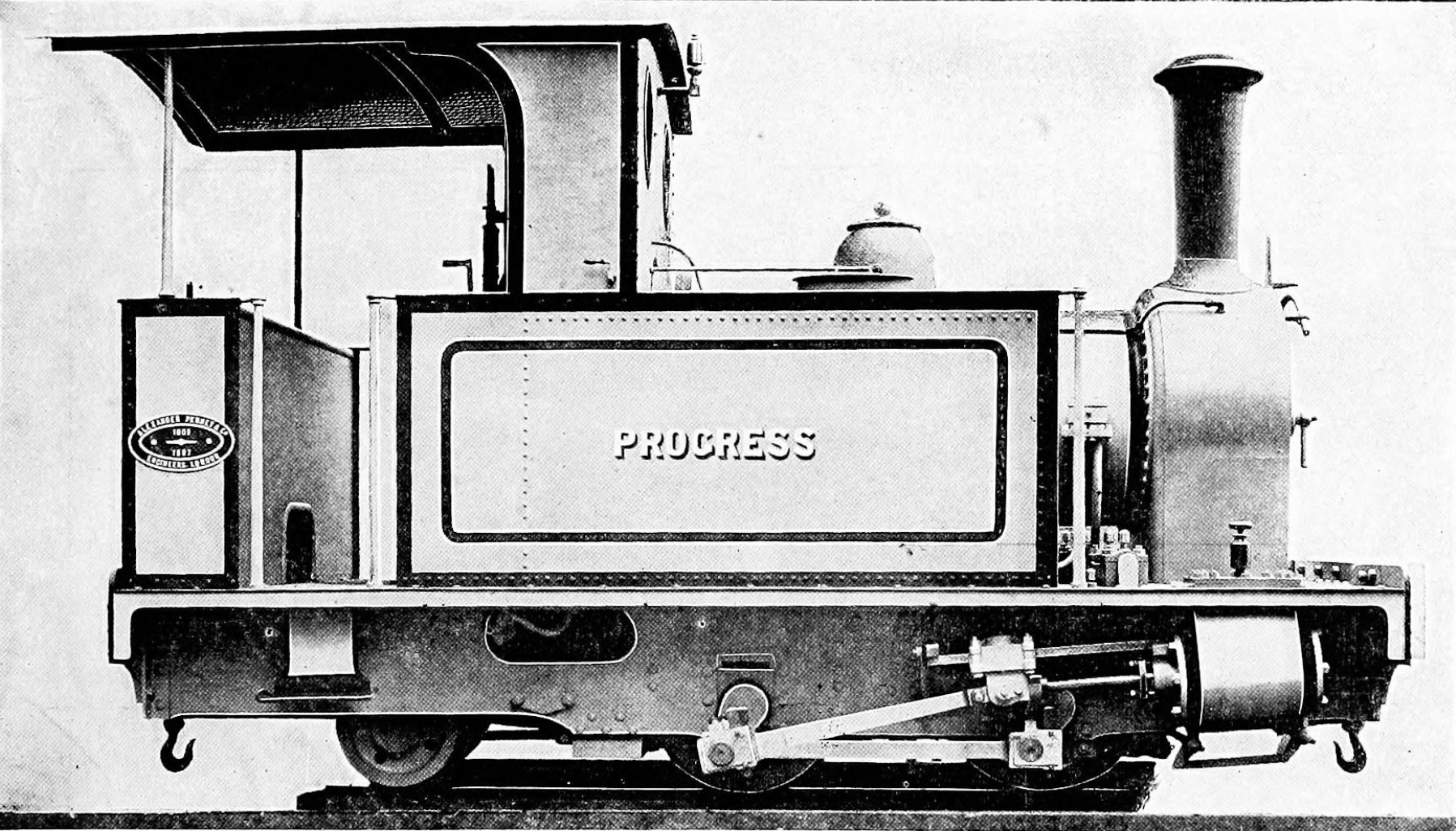
Within two years of his appointment, West and Cowie had managed to procure PROGRESS, the first train engine in North Borneo, hauling timber out of the jungle on the North Borneo Railway.

West was born in 1863 in Bromsgrove, Worcestershire, England, the son of a farmer. Little is known about his youth and early professional career, but he was recorded in a census as a teacher at the age of 17. On the recommendation of his friend William Clark Cowie, he was appointed as Chief Railway Engineer on 7 July 1896 by the North Borneo Chartered Company with an annual salary of 4,800 Straits dollars. (Note: At this time, the value of the Straits dollar was tied to the Mexican dollar and equalled the equivalent of 1 oz. Silver.) Although his previous experience was limited to the construction of the kilometre-long narrow Labuan Line, with which the coal mines of Labuan had been connected to the port of Victoria Town, his position was completely independent from any control of the Governor, being mainly directed by Cowie.

West began his work on Bukau in 1896 as the first section for the North Borneo Railway. At the same time he had to construct both the line to the north of Beaufort and south towards Brunei Bay. The terminus of the line on Brunei Bay had been selected by Cowie but proved to be too shallow as it was a mangrove forest area. West called the station there "West Town", which later became Weston. West married Mary Louisa Dixon in 1895 at Newington, London; and had two children named Arthur Gilbert Dixon (b.1898) and Willie. His first son was born in Labuan and baptised there on 28 November 1897 by the Governor of Beaufort. His family remained in the island during the first phase of construction of the North Borneo Railway.

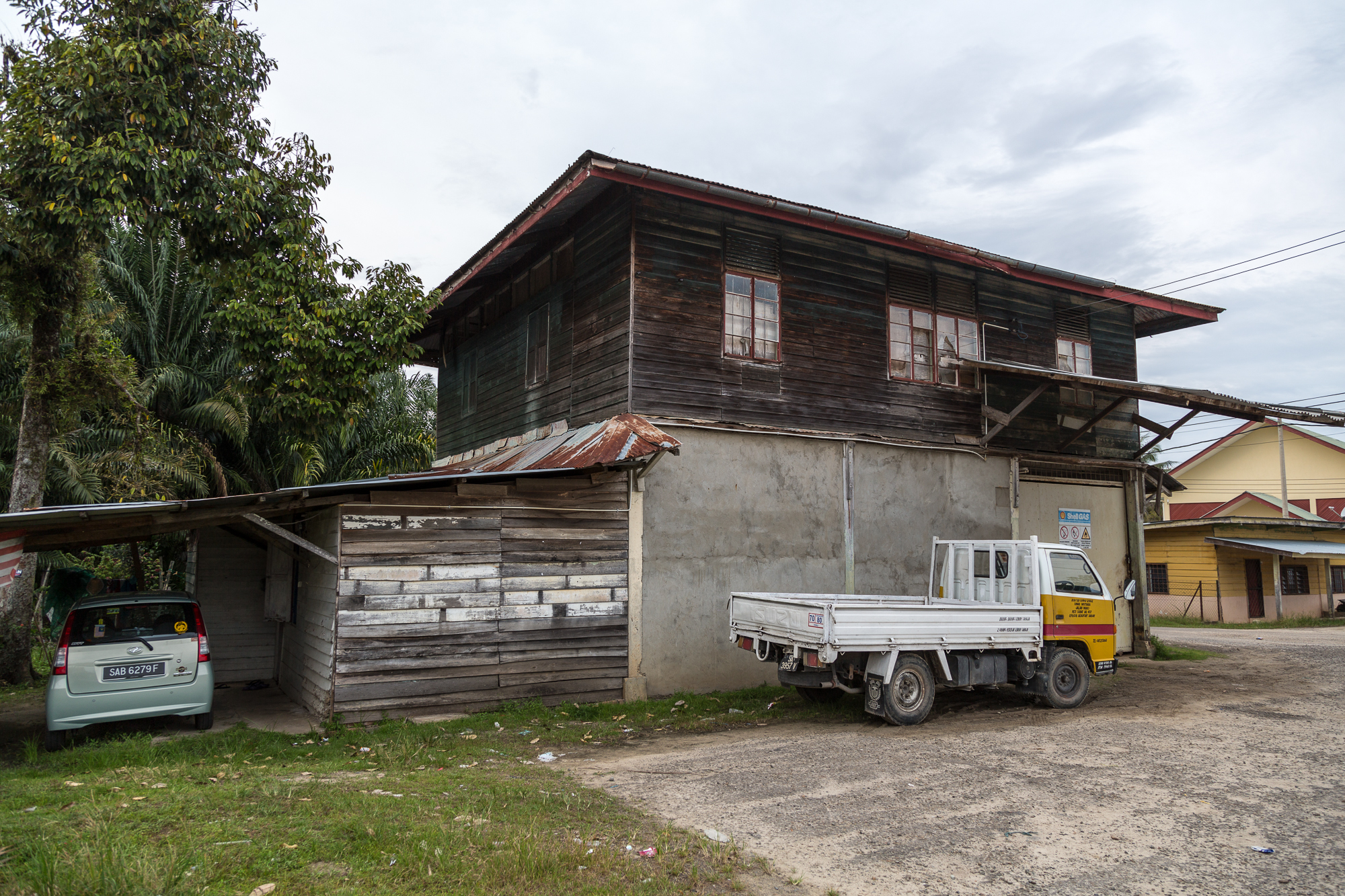
The present building of a former railway office in Kg. Lumadan near Bukau where West was possibly living with his family in the 1900.

On 3 February 1898, barely two years after the beginning of construction, the railway first opened for service. However, completion of the entire Beaufort–Weston section took two more years. From 1900, West used all his energy to extend the railway line along the Padas River to Tenom and then to Melalap. Tenom was reached in 1905; Melalap in 1906. On 1 April 1900, his family moved to Bukau. His two sons received an academic and technical education in Cambridge and entered a technical career; Gilbert, the older of the two became an assistant chief engineer at the British Broadcasting Company (BBC) while Willie became a geologist.

As his career and presence was mainly linked to Cowie, he was relieved of his post and left Borneo on Cowie's death in 1910. West died on 2 November 1937 in Bexhill-on-Sea. (Note: His wife, Mary Louisa died on 12 March 1959. Source: British National Archives. , Archive of the estate administrators Charles Sheppard and Sons: investigation into the cause of death Az. WEST SHE/2/7/1199.)

== Literature ==
- K. G. Tregonning (1965). A History of Modern Sabah (North Borneo, 1881-1963). University of Singapore.
